= Bhopal–Bina Passenger =

Train in India

Bhopal - Bina Passenger
Overview
- Service type: passenger
- Locale: Madhya Pradesh
- Current operator(s): West Central Railway

Route
- Termini: Bhopal Junction; Bina Junction
- Distance travelled: 142 km (88 mi)
- Average journey time: 4 hours
- Service frequency: Daily
- Train number(s): 51739DN / 51740DN

On-board services
- Class(es): First Class, Sleeper 3 Tier, Unreserved
- Seating arrangements: Yes
- Sleeping arrangements: Yes

Technical
- Operating speed: 35 km/h (22 mph) average with halts

The Bhopal–Bina Passenger is a passenger train of the Indian Railways, which runs between Bhopal Junction railway station of Bhopal, the capital city of Madhya Pradesh and Bina Junction railway station of Bina, in the Central Indian state Madhya Pradesh

== Arrival and departure ==
- Train no.51739 departs from Bhopal, daily at 10:20 hrs., reaching Bina the same day at 14:30 hrs.
- Train no.61632 departs from Bina daily at 17:35 hrs.reaching Bhopal same day at 21:05 hrs.

== Route and halts ==
The train goes via Vidisha. The important halts of the train are :

- Bhopal Junction
- Bhopal Nishatpura
- Bhopal Sukhsewanagar
- Bhopal Dewanganj
- Salamatpur
- Sanchi
- Vidisha
- Bareth
- Gulabganj
- Sumer
- Ganj Basoda
- Kalhar
- Mandi Bamora
- Kurwai Kethora
- Anokha Kurwai
- Bina Junction

== Coach composite ==
The train consists of 18 coaches :

- 1 First Class
- 4 Sleeper coaches
- 10 Unreserved
- 1 Ladies/Handicapped
- 2 Luggage/Brake van

== Average speed and frequency ==
The train runs with an average speed of 35 km/h. The train runs on daily basis.

== Loco link ==
The train is hauled by Ratlam ETA 22703-3 electrical engine.

== Rake maintenance & sharing ==
The train is maintained by the Bhopal Coaching Depot. The same rake is used for five trains, which are:

- Indore–Chhindwara Panchvalley Express
- Indore–Maksi Fast Passenger
- Indore–Ujjain Passenger
- Bhopal–Indore Passenger
- Bhopal–Ujjain Passenger for one way which is altered by the second rake on the other way.

== Trivia ==
- This train is expected to extend up to Saugor with effect of new rail budget - 2011

== See also ==
- Vindhyachal Express
- Indore Junction
- Bhopal Junction
