= Bhopal–Bilaspur Express =

Train in India

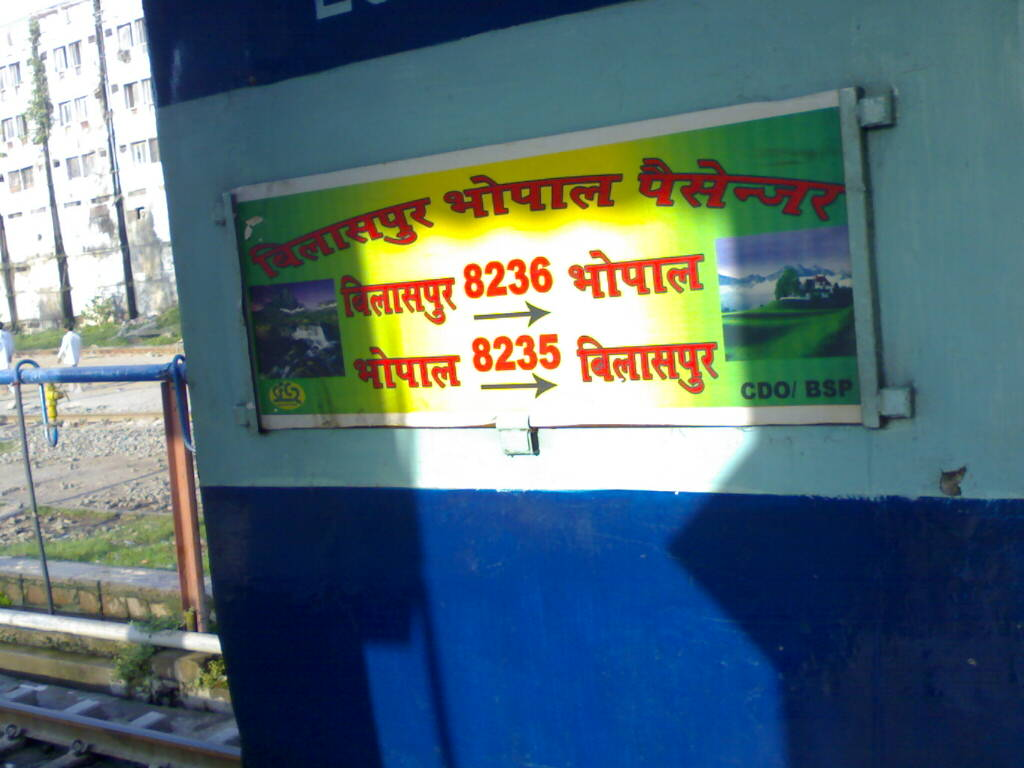

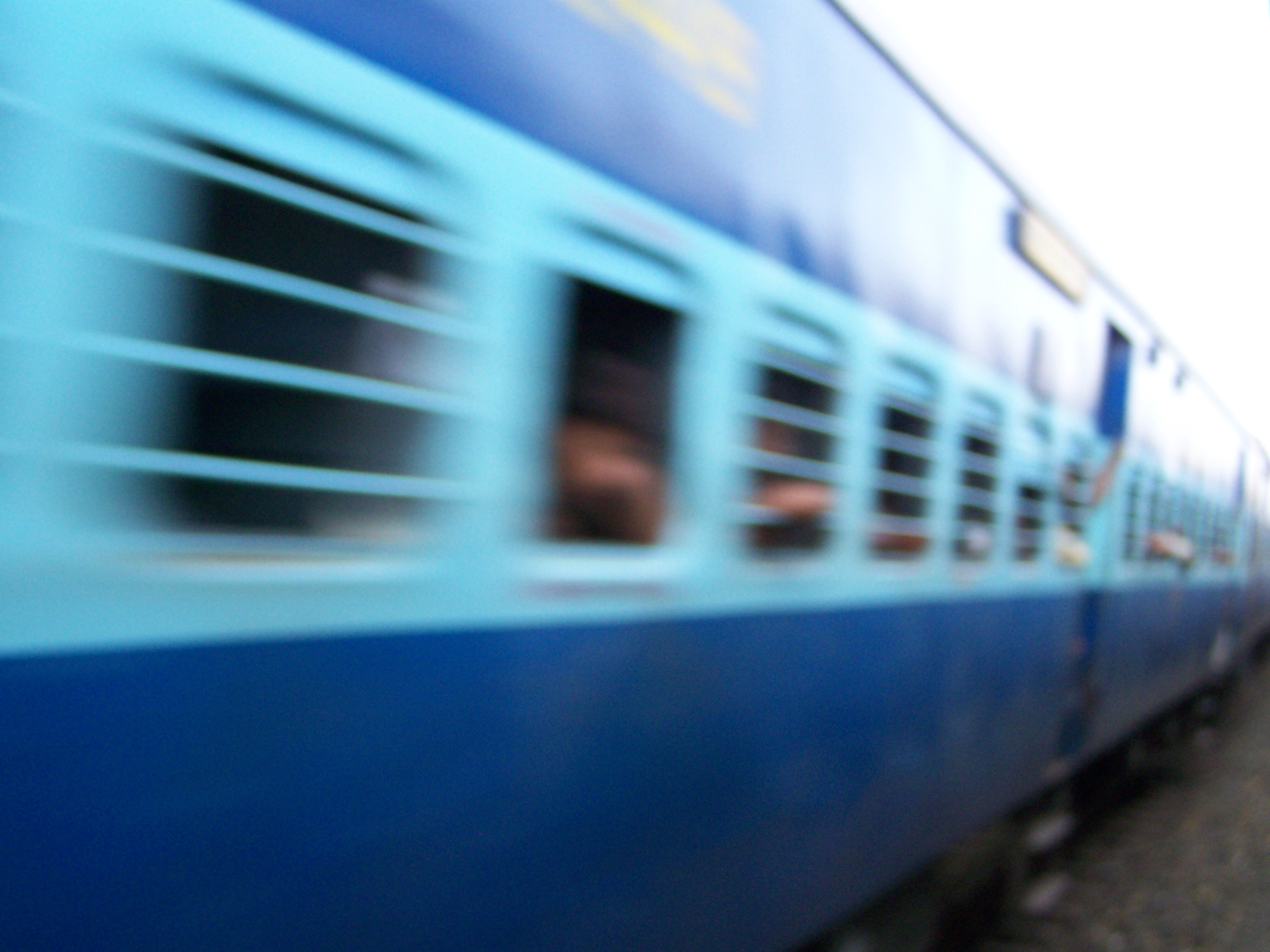
Bhopal – Bilaspur Express speeding 73 km/h between Bina Junction and Khurai Railway Station

The Bhopal–Bilaspur Express/Passenger, is an express passenger train service running between Bhopal Junction railway station of Bhopal City, the capital city of Madhya Pradesh and Bilaspur in Chhattisgarh (formerly in Madhya Pradesh.)

== Number and nomenclature ==
The train is numbered 18235 – from Bhopal to Bilaspur, Chhattisgarh and 18236 – from Bilaspur, Chhattisgarh to Bhopal.

The train is commonly referred to as Bilaspur on both sides, signifying the name of the city of its destination and origin.

== Arrival and departure info. ==
The train operates daily from both sides. Train number 18235 departs from Bhopal Junction daily at 08:00 hrs, while on return, Train number 18236 arrives to Bhopal Nishatpura railway station in Bhopal at 17:30 hrs.

== Route and stops ==
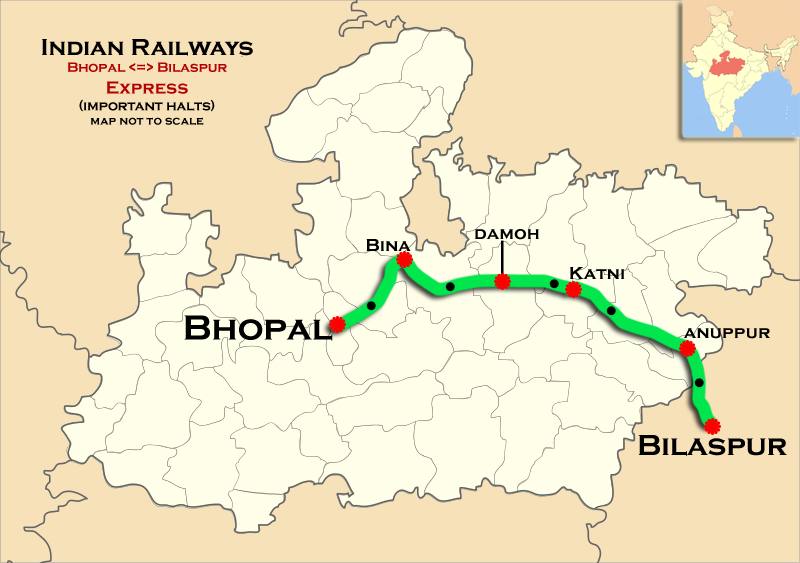
(Bhopal - Bilaspur) Express Route map

The train runs on the Bina–Katni rail route, with more than 63 stops. The train halts at suburban railway stations in addition to city railway stations. The major stations include :

- BHOPAL JUNCTION
- Bhopal Dewanganj
- Salamatpur
- Sanchi
- Vidisha
- Gulabganj
- Ganj Basoda
- Kalhar
- Mandi Bamora
- Bina Junction
- Malkhedi
- Khurai Baghora
- Khurai
- Khurai Sumreri
- Jeruwakheda
- Isarwara
- Sumer
- Nariaoli
- Saugor Ratona
- Saugor
- Saugor Makronia
- Saugor Ganeshganj
- Patharia
- Lidhora Khurd
- Girwar
- Aslana
- Damoh
- Damoh Bandakpur
- Kundalpur
- Salaiya
- Sagoni
- Katni Murwara
- Nowrozabad
- Birsinghpur
- Umaria
- Shahdol
- Anuppur Junction
- Bhanwar Tonk
- Uslapur
- BILASPUR JUNCTION

== Coach composition ==
The train is classified as a passenger train and only 1 second ac coach have air conditioned coaches.

== Average speed and frequency ==
Train no.18235 Bhopal – Bilaspur Express runs at an average speed of 54 km/h from Bhopal Junction till Khurai Railway Station. Then from Khurai Sumreri (the suburban railway station of Khurai), till Bilaspur, Chhattisgarh, its average speed reduces to 40 km/h.

Train no.18236 Bilaspur – Bhopal Passenger is solely a passenger train which halts at each and every stop till Bhopal with an average speed of 34 km/h.

The train operates daily from both cities, covering its total distance of 720 km in 23 hours.

== Slip Service (link express) ==
- 18229/18230 Bhopal – Chirmiri Passenger

== Other trains from Bhopal to Bilaspur ==
- Mahanadi Express (Cancelled)
- Narmada Express
- Amarkantak Express
- Gondwana Express
- Chhattisgarh Express
- Bilaspur Rajdhani Express
