= Bhopal–Jodhpur Passenger =

Train in India

Bhopal-Jodhpur Express

Overview
- Service type: Express
- Locale: Madhya Pradesh & Rajasthan
- Current operator: North Western Railway

Route
- Termini: Jodhpur (JU); Bhopal Junction (BPL)
- Stops: 72
- Distance travelled: 992 km (616 mi)
- Average journey time: 23 hrs 20 mins
- Service frequency: Daily
- Train number: 14813 / 14814

On-board services
- Classes: AC 3 Tier, Sleeper Class, General Unreserved
- Seating arrangements: Yes
- Sleeping arrangements: Yes
- Catering facilities: E-catering
- Observation facilities: Large windows
- Baggage facilities: No
- Other facilities: Below the seats

Technical
- Rolling stock: LHB coach
- Track gauge: Broad Gauge
- Operating speed: 43 km/h (27 mph) average including halts.

The 14813 / 14814 Bhopal–Jodhpur Express is a daily express train which runs between Bhopal Junction the capital city of Madhya Pradesh and Jodhpur, second largest city in Rajasthan.

== Arrival and departure ==
Train number 14814 departs from Bhopal Junction daily at 1655 hrs., reaching Jodhpur the next day at 1830 hrs. Train number 14813 departs from Jodhpur daily at 0940 hrs., reaching Bhopal Junction, the next day at 0920 hrs.

== Routes and halts ==
The train goes via. Bina Junction–Guna–Kota and Jaipur.

The important halts of the train are :

- Bhopal Junction
- Salamatpur
- Sanchi
- Vidisha
- Gulabganj
- Ganj Basoda
- Kalhar
- Mandi Bamora
- Bina Junction
- Ashoknagar
- Mungaoli
- Guna
- Ruthiyai
- Chhabra Gugor
- Atru
- Baran
- Kota Junction
- Indergarh
- Sawai Madhopur
- Banasthali Niwai
- Sambhar
- Makrana Junction
- Degana Junction
- Jodhpur

== Coach composite ==
The train consist a total of 17 LHB coaches out of which:

- 3 AC III Tier
- 8 Sleeper
- 4 General Unreserved
- 2 SLR cum EoG

== Speed and frequency ==
The train runs with an average speed of 43 km/h on daily basis from both the directions.

== Traction ==
Due to partial electrification of the route an Itarsi Loco Shed-based WAP-7 electric locomotive hauls the train from Bhopal Junction to Sawai Madhopur Junction after which Bhagat Ki Kothi-based WDP-4/4B/4D diesel locomotive hauls the train towards the remaining part of the journey till Jodhpur.

== Trivia ==
- This train is one of few passenger trains in India that have sleeper coaches.
- This train is the only connection of Bhopal with Jodhpur on a daily basis.
