= Sironj Assembly constituency =

Constituency of the Madhya Pradesh legislative assembly in India

Coordinates: 24.10°N 77.69°E

Sironj
- Constituency No. 147 for the Madhya Pradesh Legislative Assembly

Constituency details
- Country: India
- Region: Central India
- State: Madhya Pradesh
- District: Vidisha
- Lok Sabha constituency: Sagar
- Established: 1957
- Total electors: 187,421
- Reservation: None

Member of Legislative Assembly
- 16th Madhya Pradesh Legislative Assembly
- Incumbent Umakant Sharma
- Party: Bharatiya Janata Party
- Elected year: 2023
- Preceded by: Govardhan Upadhyay

Sironj Assembly constituency (Hindi:सिरोंज विधान सभा निर्वाचन क्षेत्र) is one of the 230 Vidhan Sabha (Legislative Assembly) constituencies of Madhya Pradesh state in central India. This constituency came into existence in 1957, as one of the Vidhan Sabha constituencies of Madhya Pradesh state.

== Overview ==
Sironj (constituency number 147) is one of the five Vidhan Sabha constituencies located in Vidisha district. This constituency presently covers some of the villages from Sironj tehsil with 190, and Lateri tehsil 233 villages. It has total 228 polling booths.

Sironj is part of Sagar Lok Sabha constituency, along with seven other Vidhan Sabha segments, namely Kurwai and Shamshabad in Vidisha district and Bina, Khurai, Surkhi, Naryoli, and Sagar in Sagar district.

== Members of Legislative Assembly ==
Election	Name	Party
1957	Madan Lal	Akhil Bharatiya Hindu Mahasabha
1962	Madan Lal	Akhil Bharatiya Hindu Mahasabha
1967	Mangal Singh Raghuwanshi	Bharatiya Jana Sangh
1972	I. Khan Tarzi Mashriqul	Indian National Congress
1977	Sharif Master	Janata Party
1980	Radharaman Bhargava	Bharatiya Janata Party
1985	Govardhan Upadhyay	Indian National Congress
1990	Bhavani Singh	Bharatiya Janata Party
1993	Laxmikant Sharma	Bharatiya Janata Party
1998	Laxmikant Sharma	Bharatiya Janata Party
2003	Laxmikant Sharma	Bharatiya Janata Party
2008	Laxmikant Sharma	Bharatiya Janata Party
2013	Govardhan Upadhyay	Indian National Congress
2018	Umakant Sharma	Bharatiya Janata Party
2023	Umakant Sharma	Bharatiya Janata Party

== Election results ==
=== 2023 ===
2023 Madhya Pradesh Legislative Assembly election:Sironj
Party	Candidate	Votes	%	±%
BJP	Umakant Sharma	97,995	54.83	−0.17
INC	Gagnendra Raghuwanshi	70,313	39.34	+7.18
ASP(KR)	Gabbar Singh Ahirwar	2,234	1.25	
AAP	Isem Singh Morye	1,799	1.01	
NOTA	None of the above	1,136	0.64	−0.17
Majority		27,682	15.49	−7.35
Turnout		178,720	80.59	+2.04
BJP hold		Swing		

=== 2018 ===
2018 Madhya Pradesh Legislative Assembly election:Sironj
Party	Candidate	Votes	%	±%
BJP	Umakant Sharma	83,617	55.0	
INC	Masarrat Shahid	48,883	32.16	
BSP	Isem Singh Morye	11,408	7.5	
Independent	Himmat Singh	1,735	1.14	
NOTA	None of the above	1,224	0.81	
Majority		34,734	22.84	
Turnout		152,022	78.55	
BJP gain from INC		Swing		

=== 2013 ===
2013 Madhya Pradesh Legislative Assembly election: Sironj
Party	Candidate	Votes	%	±%
INC	Govardhan Upadhyay	65,297	45.94 %	
BJP	Laxmikant Sharma	63713	44.82	
BSP	Mubarak Ali	2477	1.74	N/A
SP	Shobhna Yadav	2447	1.72	
Independent	Udham Singh Kushvah	1614	1.14	
HJP	Mohd. Najeer Khan	1244	0.88	
Independent	Mahendra Pratap Singh	1024	0.72	
Independent	Lekhraj Ahirwar	737	0.52	
BA S D	Shameena Bee	423	0.30	
Independent	Preetam Singh	372	0.26	
Independent	Khumaan Singh Ahirwar	287	0.20	
Independent	Naeem Khan	279	0.20	
NOTA	None of the Above	2224	1.56	
Majority				
Turnout		142138	77.05	
Swing to INC from BJP		Swing		
