= Orakzai dynasty =

Orakzai Dynasty
- Royal Dynasty
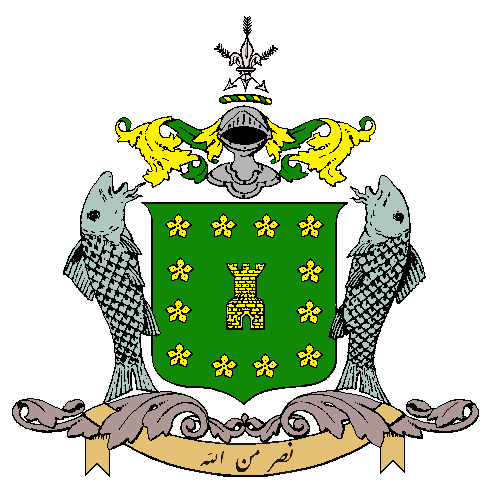
- Bhopal Coat of Arms
- Parent family: Orakzai tribe
- Country: British India
- Origin: Tirah
- Founder: Orak (Wrak)
- Titles: Nawab of Bhopal; Nawab of Kurwai; Nawab of Basoda; Nawab of Muhammadgarh
- Traditions: Sunni Islam
- Motto: Nasir min allah (God Givith Victory)
- Cadet branches: Mirazi Khel; Firuz Khel

The Orakzai dynasty is a South Asian dynasty, directly descended from the Orakzai tribe. Various branches ruled the princely states of Bhopal, Kurwai, Muhammadgarh and Basoda.

== History ==
The Orakzai dynasty is divided into two branches: the Mirazi Khel, founded by Dost Mohammad Khan, and the Firuz Khel, founded by Diler Khan.
