= Bhopal Agency =

Coordinates: 23.2500°N 77.9369°E

- Agency of British India
- 1818–1947
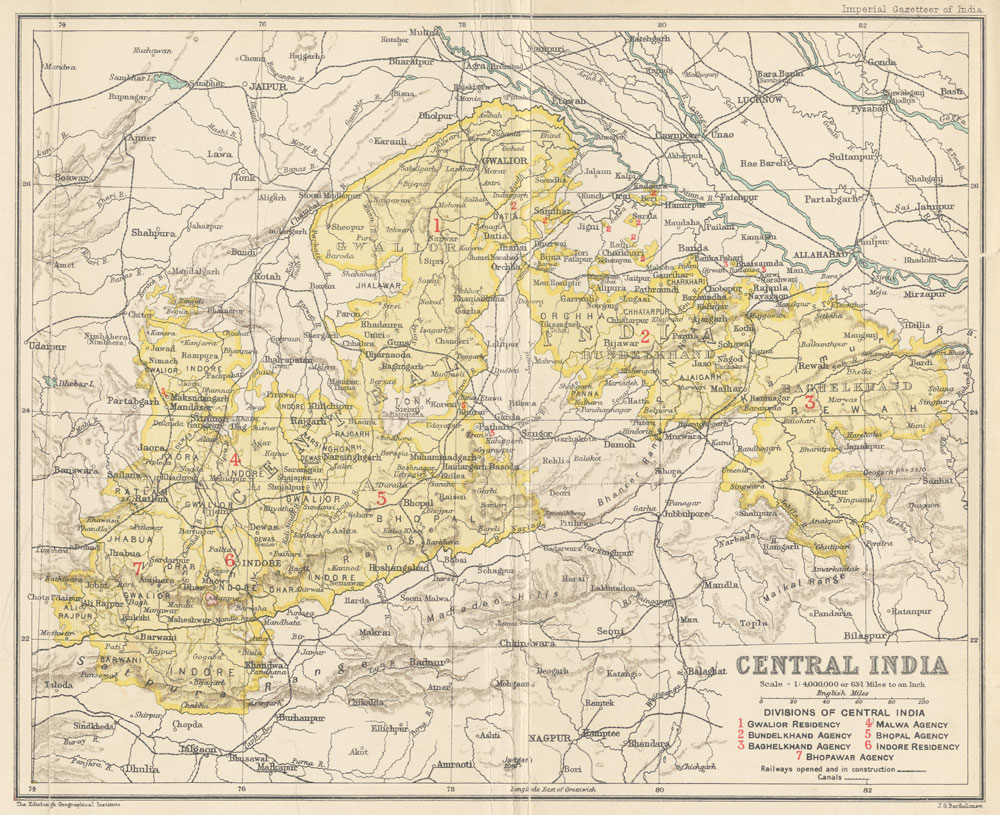
- Map of the Central India Agency with the Bhopal Agency in its central sector
- Area
  - 1901: 30,181 km^{2} (11,653 sq mi)
- Population
  - 1901: 1,157,697
- History
  - Established: 1818
  - Accession to the Indian Union: 1947
Succeeded by
India

The Bhopal Agency was a section of British India's colonial Central India Agency, a British political unit which managed the relations of the British with a number of autonomous princely states existing outside British India.

== History ==
The Agency was formed in 1818 at the conclusion of the Third Anglo-Maratha War, and covered the princely states of Bhopal (largest and eponymous), Khilchipur, Kurwai, Narsingarh, Muhammadgarh, Pathari and Rajgarh surrounding Bhopal, as well as the districts of Bhilsa and Isagarh, which belonged to the Gwalior State and also the district of Sironj, which belonged to Tonk State in Rajputana.

The head of the Agency was appointed by the British Governor-General of India. In 1854 the Bhopal Agency became part of the newly created Central India Agency. In 1895 the Gwalior districts of Bhilsa and Isagarh were transferred from Bhopal Agency to Gwalior Residency. In 1931 the princely states of Dewas Senior and Dewas Junior were added to the agency and in 1933 the state of Makrai was transferred from the Central Provinces and Berar.

Bhopal Agency ceased to exist at the stroke of midnight on 15 August 1947 when British India became independent, and all treaty relations between the princely states and the British ceased to exist. After the departure of the British, the rulers of these states all acceded to the Dominion of India, and all but Bhopal were incorporated into the new state of Madhya Bharat, while Bhopal became a Chief Commissioner's Province. Madhya Bharat and Bhopal were merged into Madhya Pradesh state on 1 November 1956.

== States and territories ==
Until 1931 the agency included nine princely states, as well as a number of estates ruled by Thakurs and other minor territories.

=== Princely states ===
Four Salute states, by precedence :

- Bhopal, title Nawab, Hereditary salute of 19-guns (21-guns local)
- Narsinghgarh, title Raja, Hereditary salute of 11-guns
- Rajgarh, title Raja, Hereditary salute of 11-guns
- Khilchipur, title Raja, Hereditary salute of 9-guns

Non-salute states, alphabetically :

- Basoda
- Korwai
- Maksudangarh
- Muhammadgarh
- Pathari
