= Muhammadgarh =

Muhammadgarh may refer to:

- Muhammadgarh State, a former polity in India
- Muhammadgarh, India
- Muhammadgarh, Pakistan
