= List of Pashtun empires and dynasties =

The following is a list of Pashtun or Afghan empires and dynasties. It includes states, princely states, empires and dynasties in the regions of Central, Western and South Asia. This list also includes rulers and dynasties who are of disputed origin, possibly originating from Afghan or other origins.

== Afghanistan ==
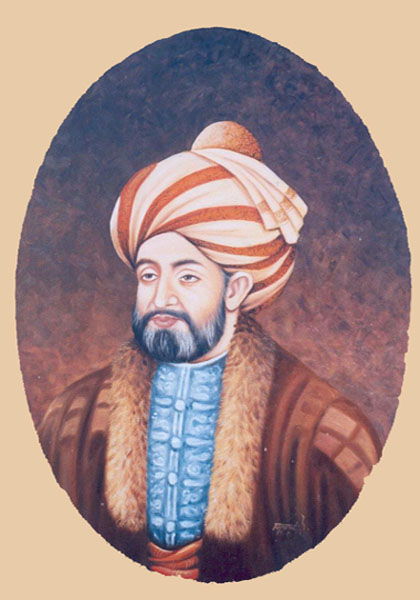
Ahmad Shah Durrani, founder of the Durrani Empire.

- Taymanis (1565/6-1894), established by Tayman, a Kakar Pashtun.
- Hotak dynasty (1709–1738), established by Mirwais Hotak, a Ghilzai Pashtun.
- The Durrani States, established by Durrani Pashtuns:
  - Durrani Empire (1747-1823), founded by Ahmad Shah Durrani. In the second half of the 18th century, the Durrani Empire was the second-largest Muslim empire in the world after the Ottoman Empire.
  - Principality of Herat (1793-1863), founded by Mahmud Shah Durrani
  - Shah Shuja's Kingdom (1839-1842), founded by Shah Shuja Durrani
- Emirate of Afghanistan (1823-1978), established by the Barakzai dynasty
- First Islamic Emirate of Afghanistan (1996-2001), founded by the Taliban following the Afghan Civil War
- Second Islamic Emirate of Afghanistan (2021–Present), restored Taliban rule following Taliban insurgency

== Indian subcontinent ==
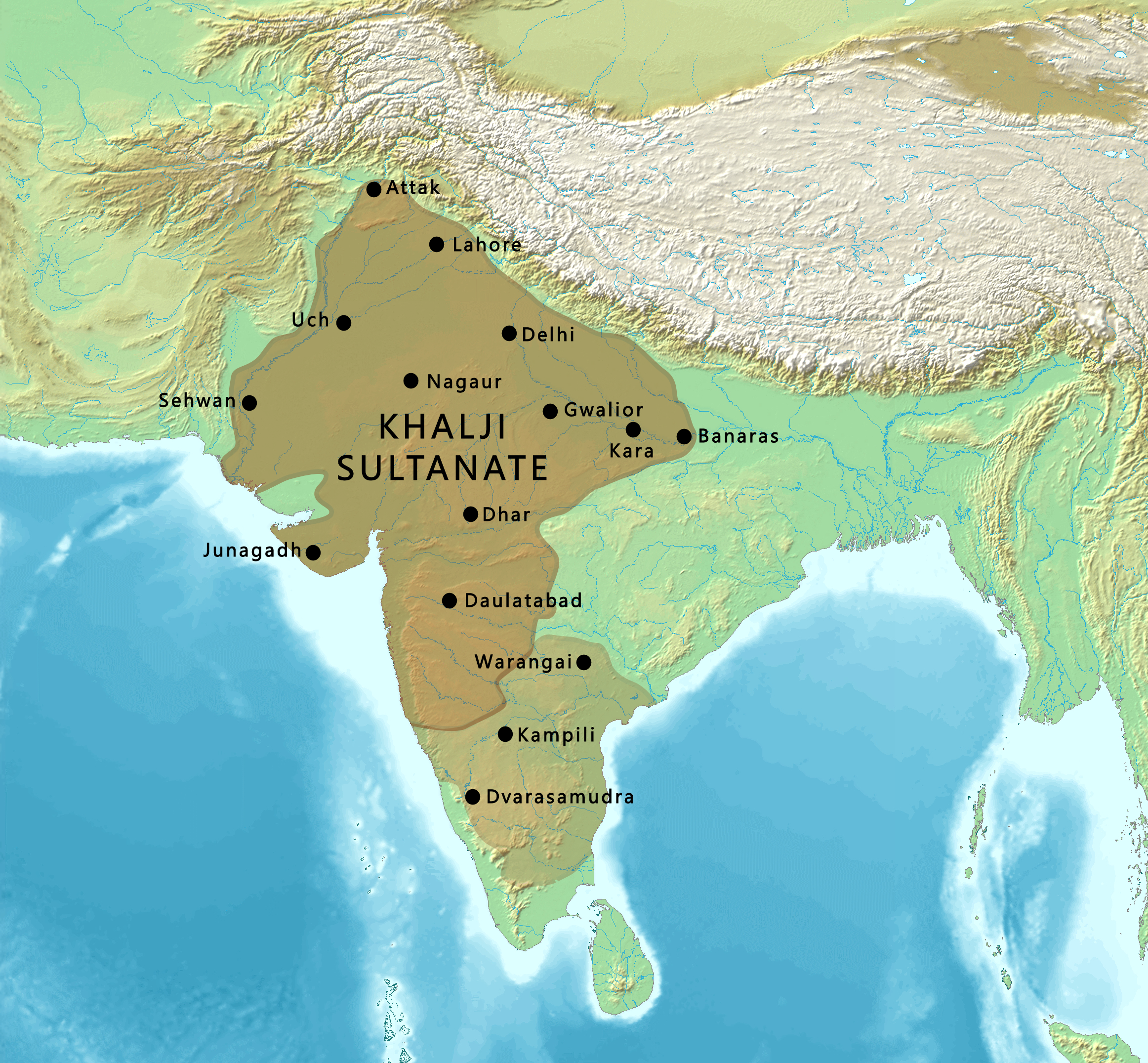
Territory controlled by the Khaljis, circa 1320

- The Khalji States, established by Turco-Afghans:
  - Khalji dynasty (Bengal) (1204-1231), established by Bakhtiyar Khalji, a Turco-Afghan general of the Ghurid army
  - Khilji dynasty (1290-1320), established by Jalaluddin Khalji, a Turco-Afghan. It was the second dynasty to rule the Delhi Sultanate.
  - Malwa Sultanate (1392-1531, 1537-1562), founded by Dilawar Khan, an Afghan or Turco-Afghan.

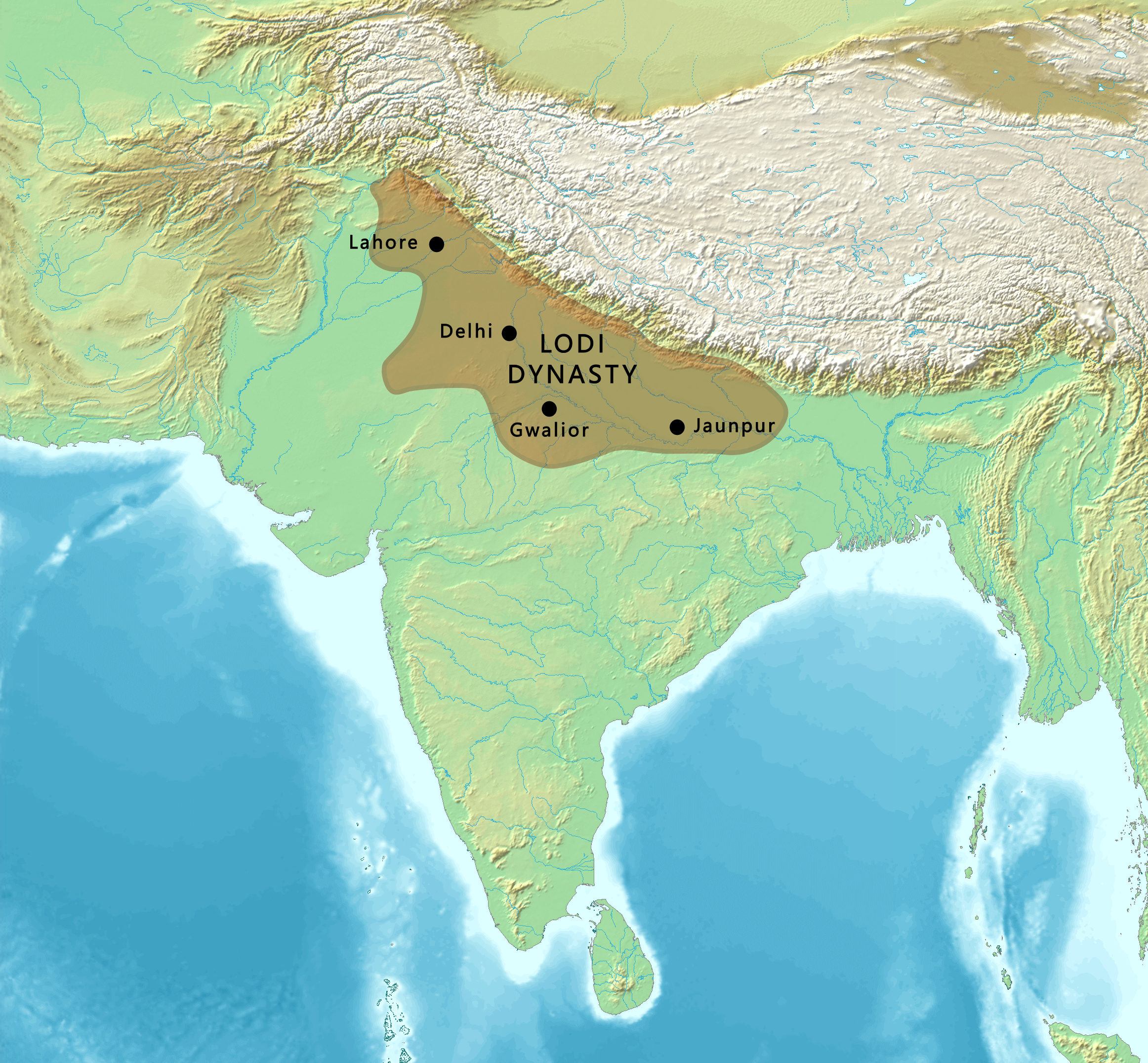
Map showing the territory under the Lodi dynasty.

- Lodi dynasty (1451–1526), founded by Bahlul Khan Lodi, a Lodi Pashtun

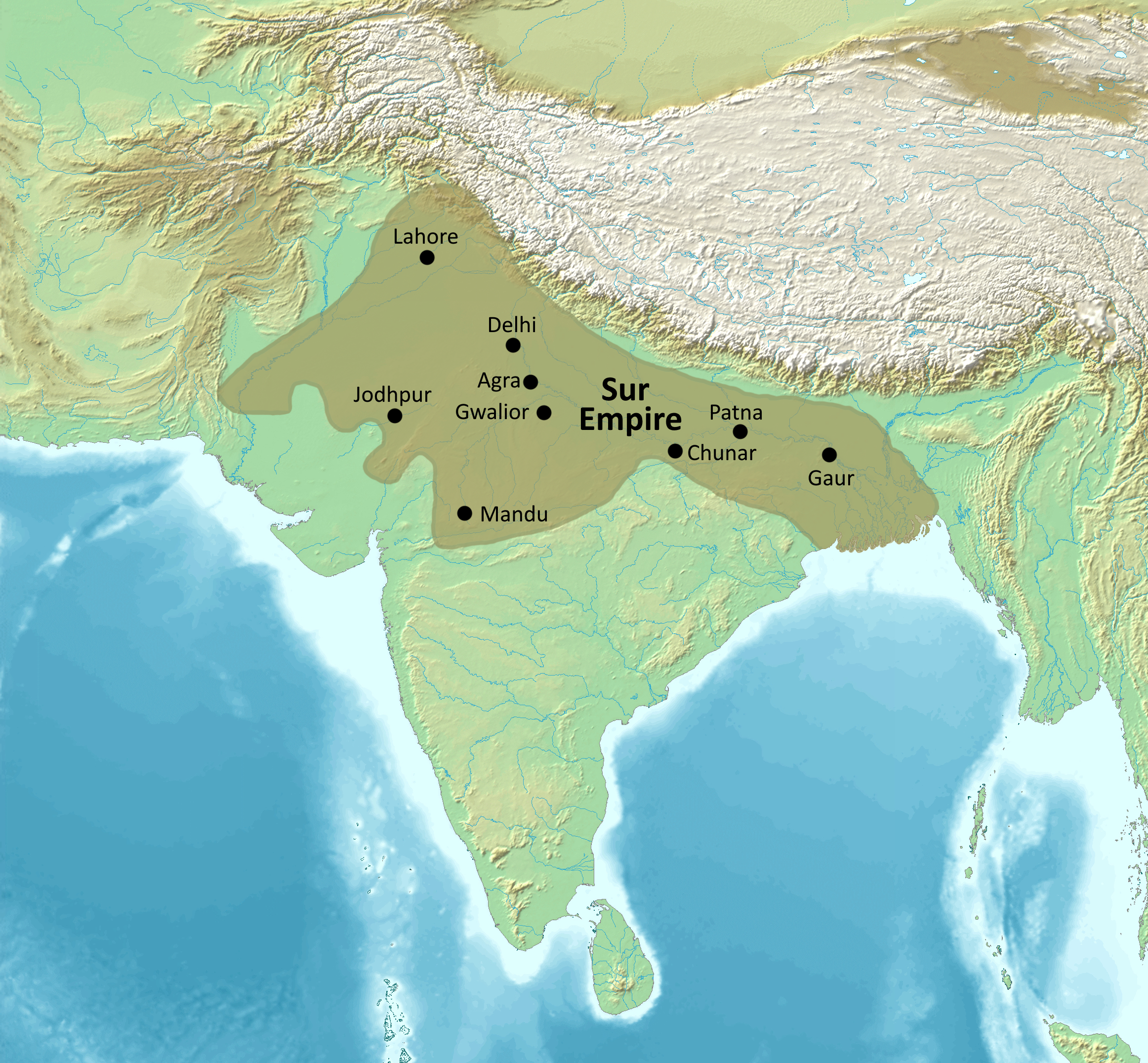
Map of the Sur Empire at its height

- Sur Empire (1538/1540—1556), founded by Sher Shah Suri, a Sur Pashtun. The Surs briefly ousted the Mughals from North India.
- Karrani dynasty (1564—1576), founded by Taj Khan Karrani, a Karlani Pashtun
- Noohani dynasty (1523—1532), founded by Bahar Khan Noohani.

=== Disputed Origins ===
- Lodi dynasty of Multan (970s–1010), founded by Sheikh Hamid Lodi, supposedly a descendant of Ghalib Lawi, or from the Lodi Pashtuns. According to Samuel Miklos Stern, the dynasty itself might have been fabricated.
- Bahmani Sultanate (1347–1527), founded by Ala-ud-Din Bahman Shah, who was of Pashtun or Turkic origin. The Bahmanis took power after an Afghan, Nasir-ud-din Ismail Shah, also known as Ismail Mukh, led a rebellion against the Tughlaq dynasty of the Delhi Sultanate.
- Madurai Sultanate (1335–1378), founded by Jalaluddin Ahsan Khan, a Sayyid native of Kaithal, or an Afghan.
- Baro-Bhuyan Confederacy (1576–1612), led by Isa Khan, a resistance leader who united the chiefs of Bengal against the Mughal Empire and their invasions into Bengal. Isa Khan himself was potentially of Rajput or Afghan origin.

=== Princely states ===
Several independent princely states founded by Pashtuns existed during the British Raj.

- The Rohilla Chieftaincies (1710–1857). Ali Mohammed Khan, a Pashtunized Jat adopted by Daud Khan Barech, founded the Kingdom of Rohilkhand. After his death, the Rohilla chiefs fought each other for power. After the First Rohilla War, only Rampur State, under Ali's son, Faizullah Khan, survived as a princely state.
- The Orakzai States, established by the Orakzai dynasty:
  - Bhopal State (1707–1949), founded by Dost Mohammad Khan, a Pashtun soldier in the Mughal Army, belonging to the Mirazi Khel clan of the Orakzai tribe
  - Kurwai State (1713–1948), founded by Muhammad Diler Khan, a Pashtun rising through merit in the Mughal Army, belonging to the Firoz Khel clan of the Orakzai tribe
  - Basoda State (1753–1947), established by Muhammad Ahsanullah Khan, son of Muhammad Diler Khan of Kurwai State
  - Mohammadgarh State (1818–1947), established by Muhammad Khan, son of Muhammad Ahsanullah Khan of Basoda State
- The Babi States, established by the Babi dynasty, founded in 1654 by Sher Khanji Babi of the Babai Pashtuns:
  - Junagadh State (1730–1948), founded by Sher Khanji Babi
  - Radhanpur State (1753–1948), founded by Jawan Mard Khan Babi II
  - Balasinor State (1758–1948), founded by Sardar Muhammed Khan Babi
  - Bantva Manavadar (1733–1947), founded by Diler Khan Salabat Muhammed Khan Babi
  - Sardargarh Bantva (1733–1948), founded by Khan Shri Sherzamankhanji Babi
- Farrukhabad State (1714-1857), founded by the mercenary Muhammad Khan Bangash
- Malerkotla State (1657–1948), founded by Sheikh Sadruddin-i-Jahan of the Sherani tribe
- Pataudi State (1804–1947), established by Nawab Faiz Talab Khan of the Barech tribe
- Dujana State (1806–1948), established by Nawab Abdus Samad Khan of the Yusufzai tribe
- Tonk State (1806–1949), founded by Amir Khan, a Salarzai sub-branch of ilyaszai Yusufzai Pashtun
- Jaora State (1808–1948), founded by Abdul Ghafur Muhammad Khan, a Rohilla from the Salarzai sub-branch of ilyaszai Yusufzai tribe
- Palanpur State (1370–1948), founded by Malek Khurram Khan, ruled by the Jhalore dynasty, of the Lohani tribe
- Savanur State (1672–1948), founded by Abdul Karim Khan, a Miani Pashtun

=== Princely Taluqdars, Jagirdars, Nawabs ===
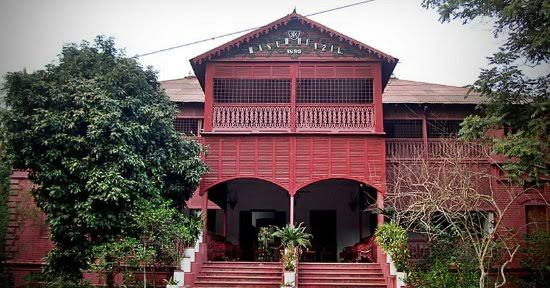
Masud Manzil, part of the Karatia Zamindari founded by Bayazid Khan Panni.

- Nanpara Taluqdari (1632–1947), founded by Rasul Khan
- Mamdot Nawabi (1800–1947), founded by Qutubuddin Khan, a Kheshgi Pashtun
- Natore Khanate, founded by Muhammad Zaman Khan, descendant of Amanullah Khan
- Karatia Zamindari, founded by Bayazid Khan Panni
- Chechrirampur Taluqdari, founded by a Tendur Khan, descendant of Sher Shah Suri
- Balia Taluqdari, founded by Sheikh Mohammad Khan

== See also ==
- Pashtun tribes
- Military history of Afghanistan
- Military history of the North-West Frontier
- Pashtun colonization of northern Afghanistan
- Muslim conquests in the Indian subcontinent
- List of Muslim states and dynasties
- List of Sunni dynasties
