= Umakant Sharma =

Indian politician

Member of Madhya Pradesh Legislative Assembly
- Incumbent
- Assumed office 2018
- Preceded by: Govardhan Upadhyay
- Constituency: Sironj

Personal details
- Party: Bharatiya Janata Party
- Profession: Politician

Umakant Sharma is an Indian politician from Madhya Pradesh. He is a two time Member of the Madhya Pradesh Legislative Assembly from 2023, representing Sironj Assembly constituency as a Member of the Bharatiya Janata Party.

== See also ==
- List of chief ministers of Madhya Pradesh
- Madhya Pradesh Legislative Assembly
