= Pathari =

Town in Madhya Pradesh

- Town
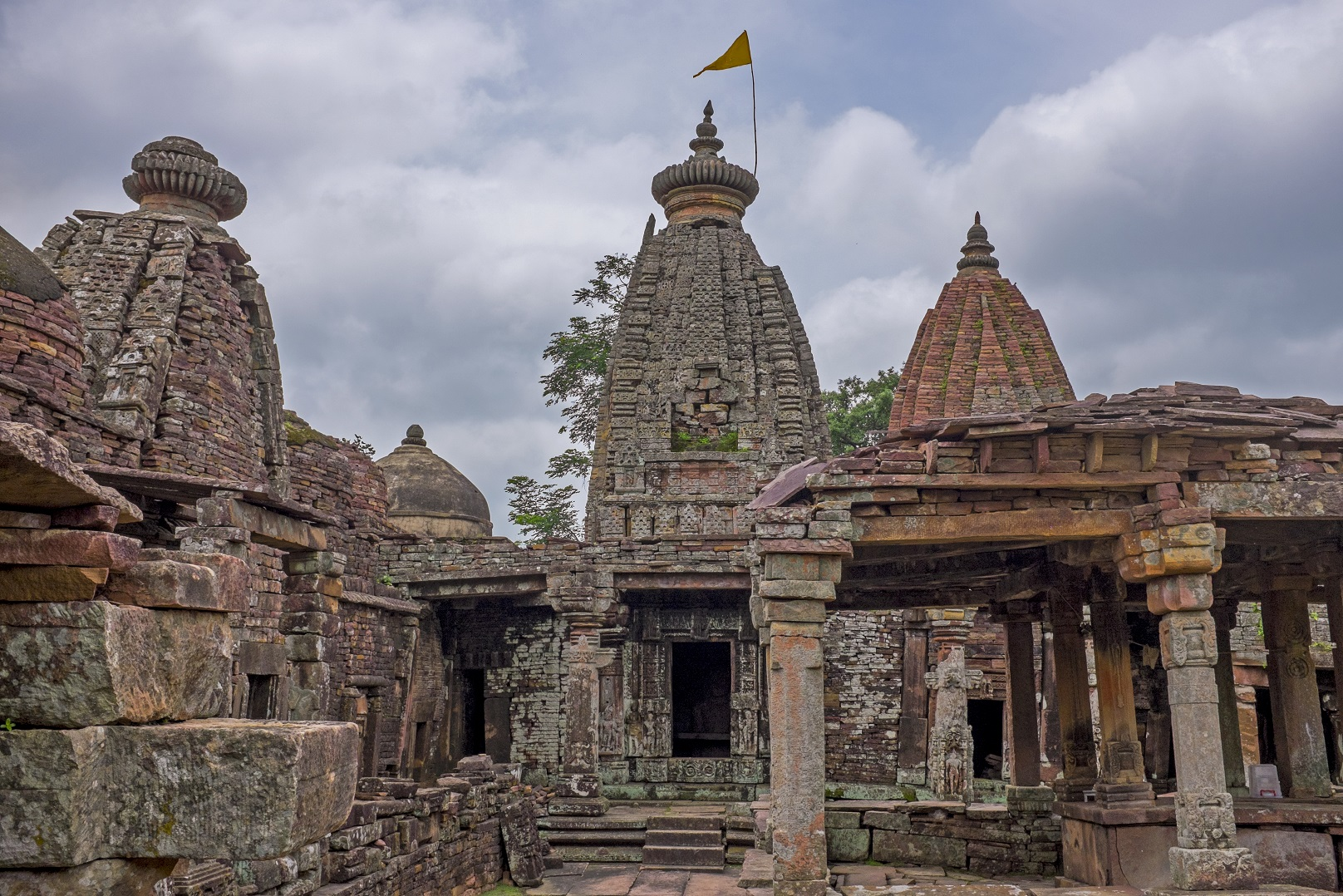
- Pathari Jain temples

- Location in Madhya Pradesh, India
- Coordinates: 23°56′0″N 78°13′0″E
- Country: India
- State: Madhya Pradesh
- District: Vidisha
- Tehsil: pathari
- Named for: Former princely state Founder =Nawab Hayder Mohammad Khan(Great Grandson of Nawab Dost Mohammad Khan/Dost Mohammad of Bhopal State) Last ruler = Nawab Abdul Rahim Khan

Languages
  - Official: Hindi, English, Urdu
- Time zone: UTC+5:30 (IST)
- PIN: 464337
- STD code: 07593
- Climate: Aw (Köppen)
- Avg. summer temperature: 34 °C (93 °F)
- Avg. winter temperature: 18 °C (64 °F)

Pathari is a town in Vidisha district, it's also a tehsil headquarter. Many tourist attractions in the Indian state of Madhya Pradesh located here.

== Geography ==
Ruins of a temple near Pathari in 1897.

Pathari is located at 23°56′N 78°13′E. It is located close to a lake on a hillock with an elevation of 550 metres. There are ancient ruins and caves close to the town in an area known as Badoh-Pathari.

== History ==
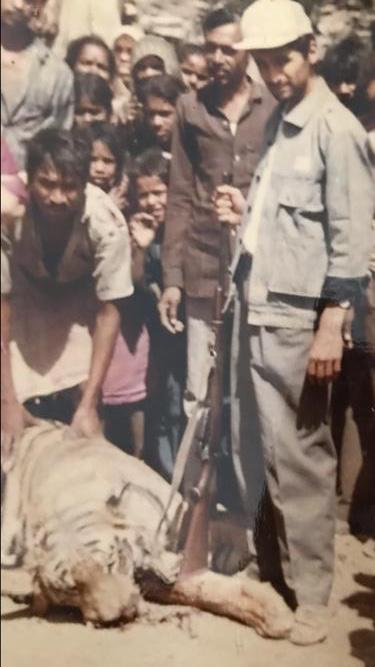
Nawabzada Umar Mohammad Khan of Pathari state with a dead man-eater tiger

During the British Raj era, Pathari was the capital of Pathari State, one of several princely states of the Central India Agency. Pathari State was established by the Nawabzada Hayder Mohammad Khan of Orakzai Clan Mirazikhel tribe. The State of Bhopal and Rahatgarh later Rahatgarh state become Pathari after losing rule over Rahatgarh by East India Company was founded in 1723 by Sardar Dost Muhammad Khan, from Tirah in Afghanistan, a descendant of the Mirazi Khel branch of the Warakzais (Orakzai) Pathans. He entered the service of Emperor Aurangzeb and had been appointed Governor of Bhairsa. Taking advantage of the disintegrating of the Mughal Empire, he declared his independence and found a separate state. Bhopal and Rahatgarh divided between two sons of Nawab Dost Mohammad Khan Nawab Yar Mohammad Khan got reign over Bhopal State and Nawab Sultan Mohammad Khan over Rahatgarh later became Pathari State.

== Demographics ==
As India Census 2011 Pathari Town has population of 8,655 of which 4,526 are males while 4,129 are females. Total 1,830 families residing here, Pathari Male literacy stands at 87.72 % while female literacy rate was 69.13 %.

== Religious importance ==
9th century built Gadarmal Jain Temple & vanmandir Jain Temple is situated here .

== Transportation ==
Pathari is well connected with Roads. Distance from nearby major cities -

- Sagar - 68 km
- Vidisha - 72 km
- Ganj Basoda - 39 km
- Kurwai - 37 km
- Bina - 37 km
- Khurai - 20 km

Nearest railway station is Khurai railway station.

== See also ==
- List of Monuments of National Importance in Madhya Pradesh/East
- Vidisha District
