= Sukhi Sewaniya =

Sukhi Sewaniya Sukhsewanagar, Sukhisewaniyan
- village
- Location within Madhya Pradesh Location within India
- Coordinates: 23.353676°N 77.4852541°E
- Country: India
- State: Madhya Pradesh
- District: Bhopal
- Tehsil: Huzur
- Elevation: 511 m (1,677 ft)

Population (2011)
  - Total: 2,510
- Time zone: UTC+5:30 (IST)
- ISO 3166 code: MP-IN
- 2011 census code: 482415

Sukhi Sewaniya is a village in the Bhopal district of Madhya Pradesh, India. It is located in the Huzur tehsil and the Phanda block. Located near the Bhopal Bypass road, it has gradually developed into a suburb of the Bhopal city.

== History ==
The name Sukhi Sewaniya is Hindi for "dry oats". The name was given by the local people as the area consist of dry grass land looking exactly like dry oat fields. The people now also often call the region as Sookhi Simaiyaan. Sukhsewanagar ("Pleasure and Service City") is a later adaptation of the original name.

The village was established in 1958.

== Demographics ==
According to the 2011 census of India, Sukhi Sewaniya has 535 households. The effective literacy rate (i.e. the literacy rate of population excluding children aged 6 and below) is 64.29%.

Demographics (2011 Census)
	Total	Male	Female
Population	2510	1315	1195
Children aged below 6 years	354	177	177
Scheduled caste	480	272	208
Scheduled tribe	208	102	106
Literates	1386	827	559
Workers (all)	957	703	254
Main workers (total)	668	504	164
Main workers: Cultivators	73	60	13
Main workers: Agricultural labourers	230	154	76
Main workers: Household industry workers	27	22	5
Main workers: Other	338	268	70
Marginal workers (total)	289	199	90
Marginal workers: Cultivators	24	10	14
Marginal workers: Agricultural labourers	84	52	32
Marginal workers: Household industry workers	8	7	1
Marginal workers: Others	173	130	43
Non-workers	1553	612	941

== Economy ==
The village is famous for its agro-based factories and industries. It is one of the leading and second largest industrial area in Bhopal City after Mandideep.

== Transport ==
The Sukhisewaniyan railway station is located in the village. It is situated on Bhopal–Bina railway line, and the following trains stop here:

- Bhopal–Bilaspur Express
  (Bhopal–Bina–Katni–Bilaspur)
- Bhopal–Bina
  (Bhopal-Vidisha-Bina)
- Jhansi–Itarsi
  Passenger (Agra–Gwalior–Jhansi–Bina–Bhopal–Itarsi)
- Bhopal–Jodhpur Passenger
  (Bhopal–Bina–Guna–Kota–Jaipur–Jodhpur)

Raja Bhoj Airport at Bairagarh, Bhopal is the nearest airport. Inter-state and Inter-city highway connect the village to other places such as Jhansi, Sagar, Sanchi and Guna. There is a direct bus from Sukhi Sewaniya to Halalpura bus stand in Bhopal, which connects it to Nagpur, Indore, Ahmedabad, Raisen, Jaipur, Hoshangabad and Jabalpur.
