= Muhammadgarh, India =

Mohammadgarh
- town
- Location in Madhya Pradesh, India
- Coordinates: 23°39′N 78°10′E
- Country: India
- State: Madhya Pradesh
- District: Vidisha
- Tehsil: Gyaraspur

Government
  - Type: Municipal corporation
- Elevation: 432 m (1,417 ft)

Population (2011)
  - Total: 1,691

Languages
  - Official: Hindi
- Time zone: UTC+5:30 (IST)
- PIN: 481688

Mohammadgarh or Muhammadgarh is a town in Gyaraspur tehsil, Vidisha district, Bhopal division of Madhya Pradesh, India. It is located at an altitude of 432 m above sea level. The language of the local population is Hindi.

== History ==
Formerly this town was the capital of Mohammadgarh State, a princely state in Central India, under the Bhopal Agency. It had a population of 856 according to the 1901 Census of India. The town of Muhammadgarh was founded by Muhammad Khan and named after his name.
