= Hazrat Nizamuddin–Jabalpur Express =

Train in India

Hazrat Nizamuddin-Jabalpur Express
Overview
- Service type: Superfast
- Locale: Delhi, Haryana, Uttar Pradesh, Rajasthan & Madhya Pradesh
- Current operator(s): West Central Railway

Route
- Termini: Hazrat Nizamuddin (NZM); Jabalpur Junction (JBP)
- Stops: 13
- Distance travelled: 905 km (562 mi)
- Average journey time: 14 hrs 05 mins
- Service frequency: Daily
- Train number(s): 22181 / 22182

On-board services
- Class(es): AC 1 Tier, AC 2 Tier, AC 3 Tier, Sleeper 3 Tier, Unreserved
- Seating arrangements: Yes
- Sleeping arrangements: Yes
- Catering facilities: Available
- Observation facilities: Large windows
- Entertainment facilities: Yes
- Baggage facilities: Available
- Other facilities: Below the seats

Technical
- Rolling stock: LHB coach
- Track gauge: Broad Gauge
- Operating speed: 62 km/h (39 mph) average including halts.
- Rake maintenance: Jabalpur Junction

The 22181 / 22182 Hazrat Nizamuddin–Jabalpur Express is a SuperFast category train of Indian Railways, which runs between Hazrat Nizamuddin railway station of Delhi, the capital city of India and Jabalpur Junction railway station of Jabalpur, the major tourist city of Central Indian state, Madhya Pradesh. The train is India's ISO Certified train.

== Arrival and departure ==
- Train no.22182 departs from Hazrat Nizamuddin, daily at 17:45 from platform no.5 reaching Jabalpur, the next day at 08:40.

== Route and halts ==
The train goes via Agra & Jhansi Junction. The important halts of the train are:

- Hazrat Nizamuddin
- Agra Cantonment
- Mathura Junction
- Gwalior Junction
- Jhansi Junction
- Lalitpur Junction
- Bina Malkhedi Junction
- Khurai
- Saugor
- Patharia
- Damoh
- Bandakpur
- Katni
- Sihora Road
- Jabalpur

== Coach composite ==
The train consists of 24 coaches :

- 1 AC I Tier
- 2 AC II Tier
- 3 AC III Tier
- 12 Sleeper Coaches
- 4 Un Reserved
- 1 Ladies/handicapped
- 1 Luggage/Brake Van

== Average speed and frequency ==
The train runs with an average speed of 62 km/h. The train runs on daily basis from both the sites.

== Loco link ==
The train is hauled by a Katni WDM 3A diesel engine from Jabalpur till Katni. From Katni a single Tuglakabad WAP7 electric locomotive takes the charge.

== Rake maintenance & sharing ==
The train is maintained by the Jabalpur Coaching Depot. The same rake is used for Hazrat Nizamuddin–Bhopal Express for one way which is altered by the second rake on the other way.

== See also ==
- Mahakoshal Express
- Indore Junction
- Bhopal Junction
