= Dulai =

- Interactive map of Dulai
- Country: India
- State: Madhya Pradesh
- District: Vidisha

Dulai is a village in Vidisha district of Madhya Pradesh, India.
