= Kurwai Assembly constituency =

Constituency of the Madhya Pradesh legislative assembly in India

Coordinates: 24.12°N 78.04°E

Kurwai
- Constituency No. 146 for the Madhya Pradesh Legislative Assembly

Constituency details
- Country: India
- Region: Central India
- State: Madhya Pradesh
- District: Vidisha
- Lok Sabha constituency: Sagar
- Established: 1957
- Reservation: SC

Member of Legislative Assembly
- 16th Madhya Pradesh Legislative Assembly
- Incumbent Hari Singh Sapre
- Party: Bharatiya Janata Party
- Elected year: 2023
- Preceded by: Veer Singh Panwar

Kurwai is one of the 230 Vidhan Sabha (Legislative Assembly) constituencies of Madhya Pradesh state in central India. This constituency came into existence in 1957, as one of the Vidhan Sabha constituencies of Madhya Pradesh state. This constituency is reserved for the candidates belonging to the Scheduled castes since 1977, following the delimitation of the Legislative Assembly constituencies.

== Overview ==
Kurwai (constituency number 146) is one of the 5 Vidhan Sabha constituencies located in Vidisha district. This constituency presently covers the entire Kurwai tehsil of the district with 224 villages, Sironj tehsil's 116 villages and Basoda tehsil's 94 villages. It has total 264 polling booths. Total Voters in the constituency are 1,98,965.

Kurwai is part of Sagar Lok Sabha constituency along with seven other Vidhan Sabha segments namely Sironj and Shamshabad in Vidisha district and Bina, Khurai, Surkhi, Naryoli and Sagar in Sagar district.

== Members of the Legislative Assembly ==
Year	Name	Party
1957	Takhtamal Lunkaram	Indian National Congress
1962	Takhtamal Lunkaram	Indian National Congress
1967	K. Kumar	Bharatiya Jana Sangh
1972	Awadh Narayan	Bharatiya Jana Sangh
1977	Ram Charan Lal	Janata Party
1980	Panbai	Indian National Congress (Indira)
1985	Shyamlal Shankarlal	Bharatiya Janata Party
1990	Shyamlal Shankarlal	Bharatiya Janata Party
1993	Chironjilal Sonkar	Bharatiya Janata Party
1998	Raghuveer Singh	Indian National Congress
2003	Shyamlal Panthi	Bharatiya Janata Party
2008	Hari Singh Sapre	Bharatiya Janata Party
2013	Veer Singh Panwar	Bharatiya Janata Party
2018	Hari Singh Sapre	Bharatiya Janata Party
2023	Hari Singh Sapre	Bharatiya Janata Party

== Election results ==
=== 2023 ===
2023 Madhya Pradesh Legislative Assembly election: Kurwai
Party	Candidate	Votes	%	±%
BJP	Hari Singh Sapre	102,343	55.69	+3.63
INC	Rani Ahirwar	76,274	41.5	+0.26
BSP	Janki Prasad Ahirwar	2,453	1.33	−2.05
NOTA	None of the above	1,469	0.8	−0.05
Majority		26,069	14.19	+3.37
Turnout		183,774	78.36	+3.59
BJP hold		Swing		

=== 2018 ===
2018 Madhya Pradesh Legislative Assembly election: Kurwai
Party	Candidate	Votes	%	±%
BJP	Hari Singh Sapre	80,264	52.06	
INC	Subhash Bohat	63,569	41.24	
BSP	Emrat Lal Ahirwar	5,212	3.38	
NOTA	None of the above	1,308	0.85	
Majority		16,695	10.82	
Turnout		154,162	74.77	
BJP hold		Swing		

== See also ==
- Vidisha district
