= Mandi Bamora =

Mandi Bamora Bamora
- Census town
- Mandi Bamora
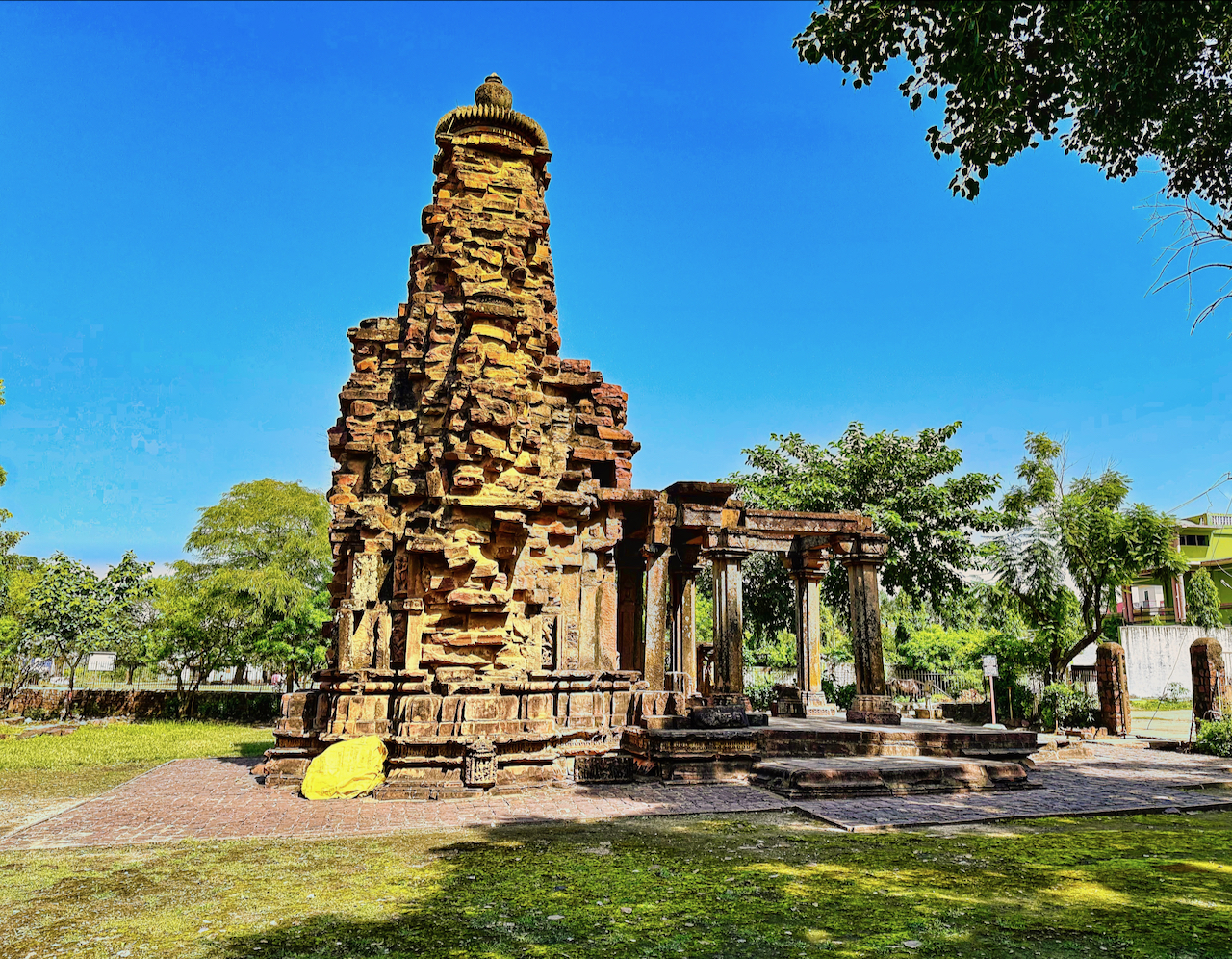
- Hazariya Mahadev Mandir Bamora
- Nickname: Bamora
- Location in Madhya Pradesh, India
- Coordinates: 24.08°N 78.08°E
- Country: India
- State: Madhya Pradesh
- District: Sagar District
- Tehsil: Bina

Government
  - Type: Panchayat

Area
  - Total: 8 km^{2} (3.1 sq mi)
- Elevation: 398 m (1,306 ft)

Population (2011)
  - Total: 20,000
  - Density: 2,500/km^{2} (6,500/sq mi)

Languages
  - Official: Hindi, Bundelkhandi
- Time zone: UTC+5:30 (IST)
- PIN: 464240
- Telephone code: 07593
- Vehicle registration: Mp 15, Mp 40

Mandi Bamora is a census town in Sagar district in the state of Madhya Pradesh, India. This place has a railway station Mandi Bamora (Station code- MABA). Mandi Bamora located as half- half way in two different district Sagar and Vidisha. Tehsil is Bina. Mandi Bamora is very famous as a name "Great country" because two different districts boundaries separated two places Bamora and Sihora.

In Mandi Bamora there is a larger Krishi Upaj Mandi for the trading of agriculture products: wheat, gram, soybean, etc. There is a very ancient temple of Lord Shiva in Madbamora near the railway station from the age of Dvapara Yuga. In Mandi Bamora there are some other old & new temples which are famous as Shiv Mandir (Narmadeshwar Shiv Mandir) near of Gangola Petrol Pump Kurwai road & Panchmukhi Hanuman Mandir in Sanjay colony at Sakrod road near railway crossing phatak of pathari road. In Mandi Bamora, there is very famous JAIN mandir (Chandraprabhu digamber Jain mandir) in second lane and very big Aadinath god idol situated inside this temple. There are some Mosques are available in Sihora as well. All Hindu, Muslim and Jain population live with the unity.Tolu singh

There are several small & big villages attached with Mandi Bamora and various people come here for buying various daily use products and selling of their grains.

== Geography ==
Mandi Bamora is located at 24.08°N 78.08°E. It has an average elevation of 398 metres (1305 feet). It is about 68 km of Vidisha . Mandi Bamora is located on a plain region and hence, its land is good for wheat and rice cultivation. About 70% of the total land area comes under cultivation.

Mandi Bamora is located in the central part of India, and is just north of the upper limit of the Vindhya mountain ranges. Located near on the Malwa plateau, it is higher than the north Indian plains and the land rises towards the Vindhya Range to the south. The city has uneven elevation and has small hills within its boundaries. The major hills in Mandi Bamora are Pathari hills and Udaypur hills in the northern region. According to current master plan, the municipality covers 5 square kilometres. It has two small lakes, collectively known as the Betwa near Kurwai & Gangola. Locally these are known as the Badi Nadi and Chota Gangola pull respectively. The Betwa Pull drains into the Betwa River. In capital of M.P. (Bhopal) The Van Vihar National Park is a national park situated besides the Upper Lake in Bhopal.

== Climate ==
Climate chart (precipitation, max. and min. temperature) JFMAMJJASOND 13 249 7.8 2811 7.2 3417 4.5 3822 8 4126 114 3725 356 3123 388 2922 196 3121 26 3218 14 2912 12 2510 Average max. and min. temperatures in °CPrecipitation totals in mm[show]Imperial conversion Mandi Bamora has a humid subtropical climate, with cool, dry winters, a hot summer and a humid monsoon season. Summers start in late March and go on till mid-June, the average temperature being around 30 °C (86 °F), with the peak of summer in May, when the highs regularly exceed 40 °C (104 °F). The monsoon starts in late June and ends in late September. These months see about 40 inches (1020 mm) of precipitation, frequent thunderstorms and flooding. The average temperature is around 25 °C (77 °F) and the humidity is quite high. Temperatures rise again up to late October when winter starts, which lasts up to early March. Winters in Mandi Bamora see average daily temperatures around 16 °C (61 °F) and little or no rain. The winter peaks in January when temperatures may drop close to freezing on some nights. Total annual rainfall is about 1146 mm (46 inches).

== Demographics ==
As of the 2011 Census of India, Bamora has a population of around 20000. Males constitute 52% of the population and females 48%. Bamora has an average literacy rate of 75%, with 58% of the males and 42% of females literate. Its 14% of the population is under 6 years of age.

== Economy ==
The main business in the region is agriculture. Mainly wheat, gram and soybeans are grown in the area because of the good quality of soil. It has many wheat-processing factory.

== Transportation ==
=== Railways ===
The railway track is the main route of railway line connected with Delhi-Mumbai and also connected with Hyderabad, New Delhi, Ahmedabad, New Delhi Indore, Bhopal, Jabalpur, Bilaspur, Rewa, Itarsi and Katni, Amritsar, Sagar, Bina, Vidisha, Gwalior, Jhansi, Agra, Mathura, Mumbai, Narmadapuram, Guna, Ashok nagar, Piprai, Mungaoli, Ganj Basoda, Narsinghpur, Pipariya, Gadarwara, Morena, Dhaulpur, Sonipat, Panipat, Ambala, Karnal . This railway station has a stoppage of 28 trains from both side. Railway station has four working platforms. The railway is the main transport services available in the city. Bina junction(Station code- BINA) is around 18 km from MABA station. The trains which have the stops here are mentioned here:

- Hyderabad – Hazrat Nizamuddin DAKSHIN EXPRESS.(Super fast)
- ((Rewa- Indore))-((Rewa, Madhya Pradesh)) REWA-INDORE EXPRESS
- Bhopal–Rewa REWANCHAL EXPRESS (Super fast).
- Amritsar–Chhatrapati Shivaji Maharaj Terminus EXPRESS
- Bhopal–Damoh Rajya Rani super fast Express.
- Bhopal–Itarsi VINDHYANCHAL EXPRESS.
- Bhopal–Bilaspur Express.
- Jodhpur–Bhopal EXPRESS.
- Jhansi–Itarsi PASSENGER.
- Bhopal–Bina PASSENGER.
- Chhattisgarh Express BILASPUR-AMRITSAR
- Jabalpur Somnath Express
- Bhopal-Khajuraho Mahamana SUPER FAST Express
- BHOPAL-BINA SPECIAL EXPRESS

=== Roadways ===
Mandi Bamora is very well connected via road to district centre as well as major towns and cities. The city has well highway connectivity with cities like Bhopal, Vidisha, Bina, Khurai, Kurwai, Ganj Basoda and many more.

=== Airways ===
Nearest national Airport is Bhopal Airport- 1.50 hrs Journey time by train.

Domestic airport is located at Raja Bhoj Airport, Bhopal.

Khajuraho Airport and Indore Airport are also near to Mandi Bamora.

== Education ==
Schools

1. Samarpan Public Higher Sc. School Near Bus Stand Nagwasa road, CBSE school
2. Govt Higher Secondary School Near Galla Mandi
3. Navankur Hr. Sec. School, Sihora-Mandi Bamora
4. Saraswati Sishu Mandir Mandi Bamora, Near Bus stand
5. Millennium Model School, Khajrod Road
6. Career convent School. Near Sihora Square
7. Visambhara Public Hr. Sec. School Near Sihora
8. Bharat Mata Convent near Bus Stand.
9. Gitanjali Public School, Kurwai Road
10. Bharat Mata Convent School, Near Bus Stand
11. Government Girls School, Sihora
12. Government Kanya Shala, near police station

=== Archaeological Shiva Temple ===
At Mandi bamora Shiv temple about 10 kilometers to the south of Archaeological Gupta site Eran, there are the ruins of several temples, of which one temple preserves by ASI the name of Shahastra Shivlinga (Shiv) Temple. It is 57 miles north west from Sagar district headquarters. Bamora used to receive the produce of the Eran paragana. There is an old temple of the late Paramara time here. The ruined temple is built of stone and is dedicated to Siva with a few loose sculptures. The temple is dated to the Paramara period (1000 AD to 1100 AD). There are numerous Jaina and Brahmanical sculptures of the late Gupta period (600 AD to 1200 AD).

It includes:

- Four ancient temples (c. 6th to 10th century AD)
- One Varah sculpture (c. 9th century)
- One Sadashiva sculpture
- One inscription (c. 6th century)
