= Hari Singh Sapre =

Indian politician

Member of the Madhya Pradesh Legislative Assembly
- In office 2008–2013
- Preceded by: Shyamlal Panthi
- Constituency: Kurwai
- Incumbent
- Assumed office 2018
- Preceded by: Veer Singh Panwar
- Constituency: Kurwai

Personal details
- Party: Bharatiya Janata Party
- Profession: Politician

Hari Singh Sapre is an Indian politician from Madhya Pradesh. He is a three time elected Member of the Madhya Pradesh Legislative Assembly from 2008, 2018, and 2023, representing Kurwai Assembly constituency as a Member of the Bharatiya Janata Party.

== See also ==
- List of chief ministers of Madhya Pradesh
- Madhya Pradesh Legislative Assembly
