= Hazrat Nizamuddin–Bhopal Express =

Bhopal Express
Overview
- Service type: Superfast
- Locale: Delhi, Uttar Pradesh, Rajasthan, Madhya Pradesh
- Current operator: West Central Railway

Route
- Termini: Hazrat Nizamuddin; Bhopal
- Stops: 10
- Distance travelled: 700 km (430 mi)
- Average journey time: 10.5 hours
- Service frequency: daily
- Train number: 12156DN

On-board services
- Classes: AC 1 Tier, AC 2 Tier, AC 3 Tier, Sleeper 3 Tier, Unreserved
- Seating arrangements: Yes
- Sleeping arrangements: Yes
- Auto-rack arrangements: available
- Catering facilities: available in all the coaches
- Entertainment facilities: yes, lcd video windows in AC 1 and AC 2 Tier coaches.
- Baggage facilities: yes
- Other facilities: mineral water supply, coffee vending machines

Technical
- Operating speed: 80 km/h (50 mph) average with halts

The Hazrat Nizamuddin – Bhopal Express is a mail/express train of Indian Railways, which runs between Hazrat Nizamuddin railway station of Delhi, the capital city of India and Rani Kamalapati of Bhopal, the capital city of Central Indian state, Madhya Pradesh. The train is India's first ISO certified train.

== Route and halts ==
The train goes via Agra & Bina Junction. The important halts of the train are:

- Hazrat Nizamuddin
- Agra Cantt.
- Morena
- Gwalior Junction
- Jhansi Junction
- Bina Junction
- Ganj Basoda
- Vidisha
- Bhopal Junction
- Rani Kamalapati

== See also ==
- Avantika Express
- Indore Junction
- Bhopal Junction
