= Girwar railway station =

Railway station in Madhya Pradesh

Girwar

General information
- Location: Girwar, Sagar district, Madhya Pradesh; India
- Coordinates: 23°50′17″N 78°56′11″E
- Elevation: 472 metres (1,549 ft)
- System: Indian Railways station
- Owner: Indian Railways
- Operator: West Central Railway
- Line: Bina–Katni line
- Platforms: 3
- Tracks: Triple Electric-Line

Construction
- Structure type: Standard (on ground)
- Parking: Yes

Other information
- Status: Functioning
- Station code: GW
- Zone(s): West Central Railway
- Division(s): Jabalpur

Services
Preceding station	Indian Railways	Following station
Lidhora Khurd towards ?	West Central Railway zone Bina–Katni line	Dangidhar towards ?
Location
- Location within Madhya Pradesh Location within India
- Interactive map

Girwar railway station is a railway station located on Bina–Katni railway line operated by the West Central Railway under Jabalpur railway division. It is situated at Girwar in Sagar district in the Indian state of Madhya Pradesh.

== History ==
Katni Bina line was established in 1923. It was started with a single track which was later converted to double track in 1982. It got electrified during 1994–95.
