= Kurwai State =

Princely state of British India (1713–1948)

Coordinates: 24°7′2″N 78°2′18″E

Kurwai State कुर्वाई रियासत / ریاست کوروائی
- Princely State of British India
- 1713–1948
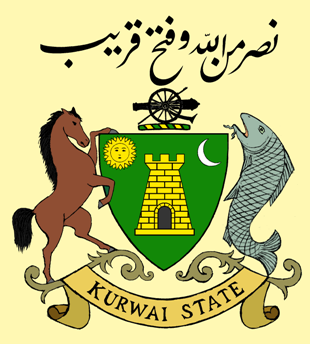
- Flag Coat of arms

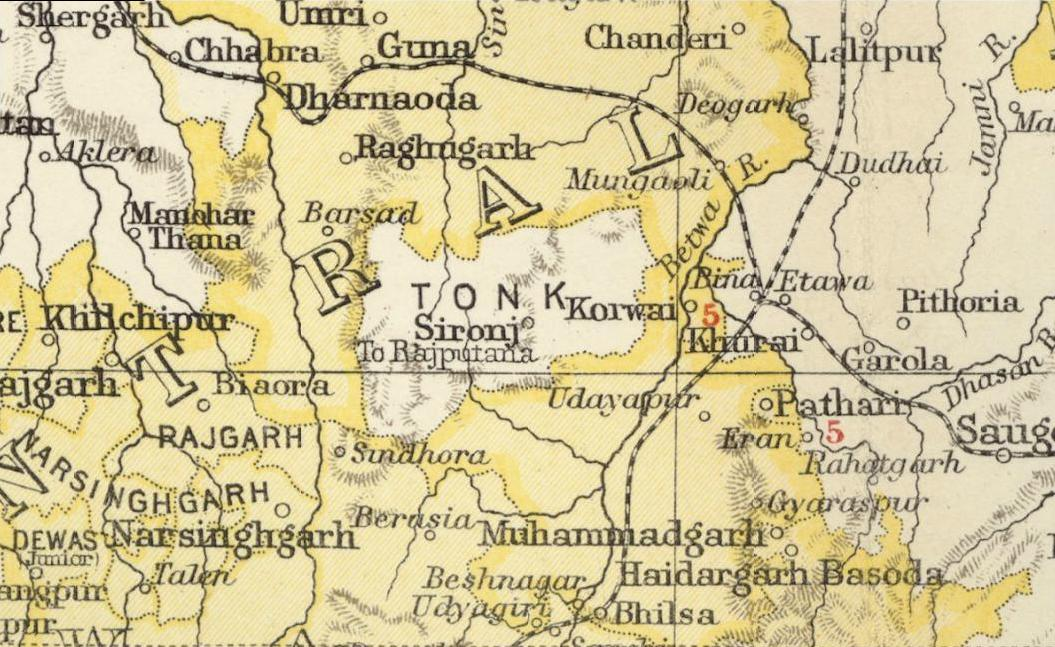
- Kurwai (Korwai) State in the Imperial Gazetteer of India
- Capital: Kurwai
- Area
  - 1901 Census of India: 368 km^{2} (142 sq mi)
- Population
  - 1901 Census of India: 13,634
- Government
  - Motto: Nasr Min Allah wa Fath Qarib
- History
  - Established: 1713
  - Independence of India: 1948
Preceded by	Succeeded by
Maratha Empire	India
- Today part of: Madhya Pradesh, India

Kurwai State was a princely state of British India under the Bhopal Agency and centered around Kurwai town. The town of Kurwai was founded by Mohammed Diler Khan in 1715. The state was 368 km^{2} in area and had a population of 30,631 in 1892.

== History ==
Kurwai State was founded in 1713 by Mohammed Diler Khan, an Afghan soldier in the Mughal army. The state came under the Maratha suzerainty in the 1730s. Kurwai later became a British protectorate in 1818, following the British victory in the Third Anglo-Maratha War. Its last ruler acceded to the Dominion of India on 15 June 1948.

=== Rulers ===
The ruling house of Kurwai was founded by Muhammad Diler Khan, an Afghan Pashtun from the Orakzai tribe as a feudal state. Diler Khan was a contemporary and cousin of Nawab Dost Muhammad Khan of Bhopal.

In 1737 Following the victory of the Marathas, Bhopal came under the suzerainty of the Maratha Empire as a semi-autonomous state and remained so until the Third Anglo-Maratha War in 1818.

In the 1740s, Kurwai, then a feudal state, came under the direct rule of the Peshwas of the Maratha Empire.

In 1761, Diler Khan's son Izzat Khan formed an alliance with the Marathas, and fought for them at the Third Battle of Panipat in 1761. The Marathas suffered a defeat in the battle, and Diler Khan was badly wounded in action. He was rescued by his maternal uncle. After recovering, Izzat Khan joined enemy camp, and received high commands, titles and territories from Ahmad Shah Abdali. He died of the battle injuries after returning to Kurwai.

Izzat Khan's son Hurmut Khan was imprisoned by the Marathas for three years. He was freed after he ceded several villages to them, and agreed to an indemnity of 3 lakhs rupees to the Marathas.

Hurmut Khan' son Akbar Mohammad Khan formed an alliance with the British in hopes of gaining back his territory from the Marathas, but following the Second Anglo-Maratha War, the British annexed the recovered lands for themselves and Kurwai became a princely state under the British suzerainty.

Hurmut Khan's successors ruled the state until 1887, his elder brother Muzaffar Khan had also died without heir. After a brief struggle with the Nawab of Basoda, Najaf Khan's maternal grandson Munawar Ali Khan became the ruler of the princely state. After Munawar Khan died without issue, his younger brother Yaqub 'Ali Khan became the Nawab of Kurwai. Yaqub married Munawar's wife Umar un-nisa. Their four-year-old son Sarwar Ali Khan became the Nawab after Yaqub's death in an accident at Bhopal.

==== Sarwar Ali Khan ====
When Sarwar Ali Khan was young, the state was ruled by a regency council headed by Umar un-nisa, who came to be known as "Sarkar Amma" (Mother Governor). She established several institutions for welfare of the citizens, including a rural bank that provided interest-free loans.

Sarwar Ali Khan and his sisters were the first generation in the family to receive English education. He studied at the Daly College (Indore), Mayo College (Ajmer) and the Sandhurst Military Academy. After graduating from Sandhurst in 1921, he severed with the Worcestershires until 1923. During this stint, he guarded Mahatma Gandhi in the British custody. In 1926, he married Abida Sultan, the eldest daughter and heiress presumptive of the Nawab of Bhopal. Their only son, Shaharyar Khan, was born in 1934. The marriage eventually failed, and Sarwar Ali later married other women. Abida Sultan gave up her right to the throne of Bhopal and opted for the Muslim nation Pakistan in 1950, eventually entering that country's Foreign service. Later, Shaharyar Khan became the Foreign Secretary of Pakistan and then the Chairman of the Pakistan Cricket Board. Sarwar Ali Khan's second wife was Ayesha, daughter of the Nawab of Wai. They had three children: Kaiser Zaman, Zafar Ali Khan and Munawar Ali Khan.

During Sarwar Ali Khan's reign, Kurwai saw development of modern infrastructure including roads, telephone network, sanitary facilities, bridges, schools, courts, police station, civil hospital government offices, a power station and a Legislative Assembly. The power was transferred to the Government of newly independent India in 1947.

On 15 June 1948, Kurwai State officially acceded to the Indian Government. Kurwai became part of the newly created state of Madhya Bharat, and was added to Vidisha District. Madhya Bharat was merged into Madhya Pradesh on 1 November 1956.

Sarwar Ali Khan continued to be involved in the political process. A friend of the Harijan leader Jagjeevan Ram, he encouraged the emancipation of the lower castes, and also campaigned against the dowry system and forced marriage. After his death in 1986, the title Nawab of Kurwai passed on to his son Zafar Ali Khan. Sarwar Ali's daughter Kaiser Zaman studied English at Somerville College, Oxford University. She later founded the All Saints School Bhopal and the All Saints College of Science & Commerce.

=== List of Nawabs ===
Rulers of Kurwai State bore the title of 'Nawab'. The rulers of Basoda and Mohammadgarh states were part of the same dynasty:

- 1713 – 12 Oct 1722 Mohammad Diler Khan (b. c.1670 - d. 1722)
- 12 Oct 1722 - 1762 Mohammad `Izzat Khan (d. 1762)
- 1722 – 1727 Mohammad Ahsanullah Khan -Regent
- 1762 – 1792 Mohammed Hormat Khan (d. 1792)
- 1792 - 1839 Akbar Mohammad Khan (d. 1839)
- 1839 – 11 Aug 1858 Mohammad Mozaffar Khan (d. 1858)
- 11 Aug 1858 – 15 Jan 1887 Mohammad Najaf Khan (b. 1822 – d. 1887)
- 15 Jan 1887 – 10 Sep 1896 Monawar `Ali Khan (b. 1869 - d. 1896)
- 15 Jan 1887 – 1892 Mian Mazhar `Ali Khan -Regent
- 10 Sep 1896 - 1 Oct 1906 Mohammad Ya`qub `Ali Khan (b. 1876 - d. 1906)
- 1 Oct 1906 – 15 Aug 1947 Mohammad Sarwar `Ali Khan (b. 1901 - d. 1986)
- 1 Oct 1906 – 9 Apr 1923 Umar un-nisa Begum (f) -Regent (d. 1963)

== See also ==
- List of Pashtun empires and dynasties
- Mahseer in heraldry
- Pathans of Madhya Pradesh
- Political integration of India
- Dost Mohammad Khan, Nawab of Bhopal
- Sajida Sultan
- Shahryar Khan
