= Gulabganj =

Town in Madhya Pradesh, India

- Tehsil
- Location in Madhya Pradesh Gulabganj (India)
- Coordinates: 23.682369°N 77.907488°E
- Country: India
- State: Madhya Pradesh
- District: Vidisha district
- Tehsil: Gulabganj tehsil

Government
  - Type: Janpad Panchayat
  - Body: Council

Languages
  - Official: Hindi
- Time zone: UTC+5:30 (IST)
- ISO 3166 code: MP-IN

Gulabganj (Village ID 481751) is a town in Vidisha district in Madhya Pradesh state in India.its a tehsil in Vidisha District.

According to the 2011 census it has a population of 1844 living in 385 households. Its main agriculture product is soybean growing.

Gulabganj has a railway station on the Agra Bhopal railway line.

It is located on Basoda to Vidisha road. Its 25 km away from district headquarters.

== In popular culture ==
The town is portrayed in 2023 television series Guns & Gulaabs.

== See also ==
- Vidisha District
- Gulabganj tehsil
