= Laxmikant Sharma =

Indian politician (died 2021)

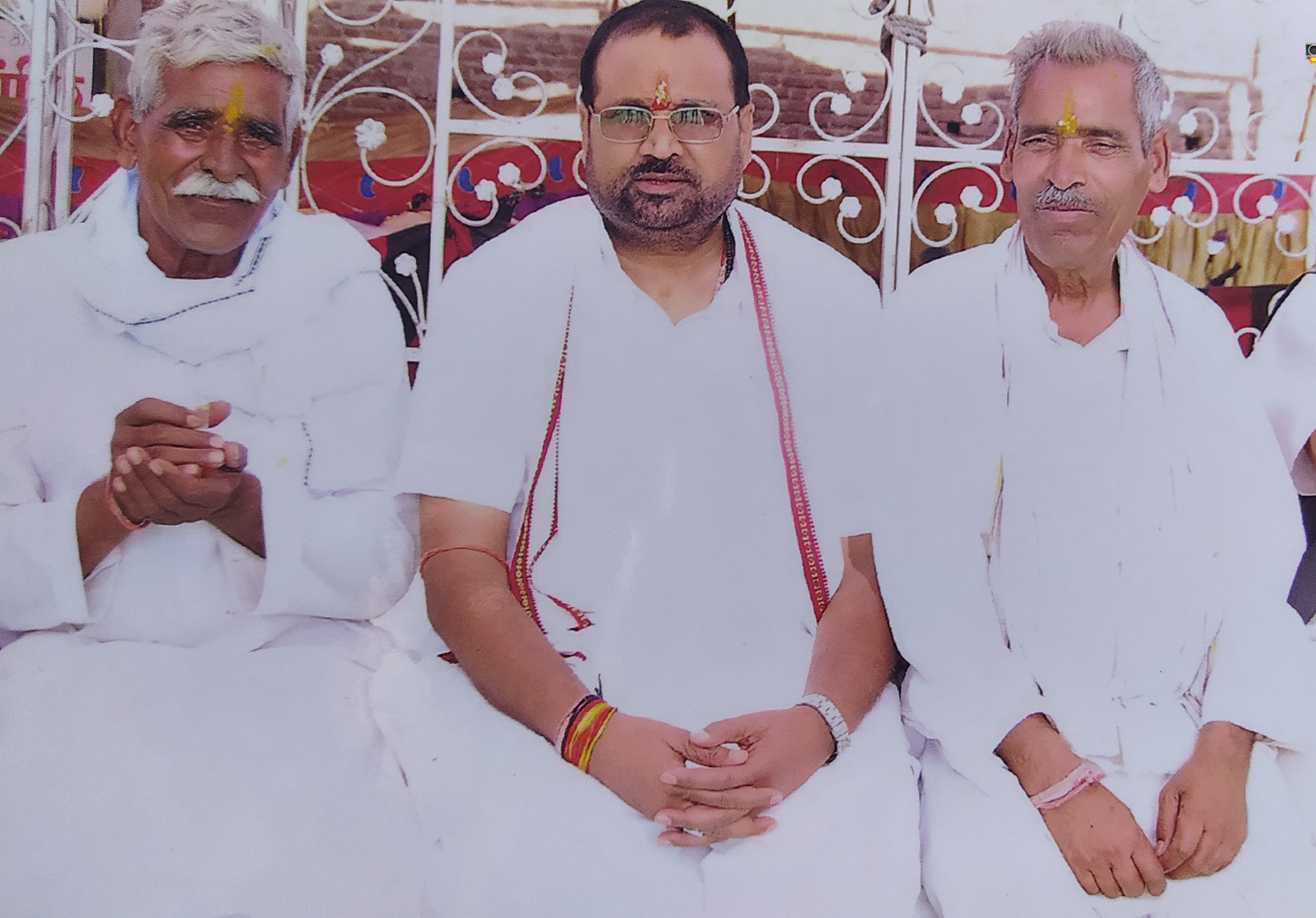

Member of Legislative Assembly, Madhya Pradesh
- In office 1993–2013
- Preceded by: Bhavani Singh
- Succeeded by: Govardhan Upadhyay
- Constituency: Sironj

Personal details
- Born: 1960 or 1961
- Died: May 31, 2021 (aged 60)

Laxmikant Sharma (24 January 1960– May 31, 2021)he is MLA on sironj seat in Madhya Pradesh from 1993 to 2013 from Bjp he is also a cabinet minister in Madhya Pradesh was an Indian politician.

== Biography ==
Sharma was a member of the Madhya Pradesh Legislative Assembly elected from Sironj.

During the Vyapam investigation he was placed in judicial custody. He served as minister for Education of Madhya Pradesh and leader of Bharatiya Janata Party.

He was one of the accused in the Vyapam scam. He was Mla for 20 year from 1993 to 2013 Sharma died at Chirayu Hospital in Bhopal, where he was being treated for COVID-19 during the COVID-19 pandemic in India, aged 60.
