= Govardhan Upadhyay =

Indian politician (1943–2020)

Member of the Madhya Pradesh Legislative Assembly
- In office 2013 – 5 November 2020
- Preceded by: Laxmikant Sharma
- Constituency: Sironj

Personal details
- Born: 22 September 1943
- Died: 5 November 2020 (aged 77)
- Citizenship: India
- Party: Indian National Congress
- Spouse: Savitri Upadhyay
- Education: LLB
- Alma mater: Barkatullah University
- Profession: Politician

Goverdhan Upadhyay (22 September 1943 – 5 November 2020) was an Indian politician and a member of the Indian National Congress party.

== Career ==
Govardhan Upadhyay was elected MLA for Sironj Madhya Pradesh Constituency with Indian National Congress ticket in 1984 and 2013. He was also involved in village state politics where he was sarpanch, Zila Parishad president. He was very active in social work from childhood. He was one of the founder trustees of Shree Sadguru Seva Sang Trust Aanandpur Madhya Pradesh and Chitrkut.

He was MLA for Sironj Legislative Constituency twice.

== Personal life ==
Married to late Savitri Upadhyay, he had four sons and three daughters.

Education - BA LLB

Profession - farmer, politician

== See also ==
- Madhya Pradesh Legislative Assembly
- 2013 Madhya Pradesh Legislative Assembly election
- 2008 Madhya Pradesh Legislative Assembly election
