= Mohammadgarh State =

Coordinates: 23°39′N 78°12′E

Mohammadgarh State मोहम्मदगढ़ रियासत
- Princely State
- 1842–1948
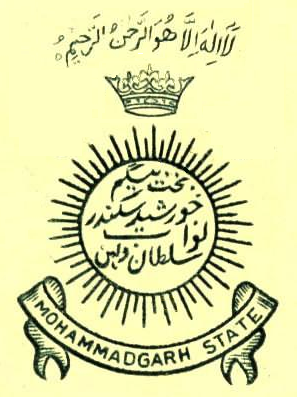
- Coat of arms

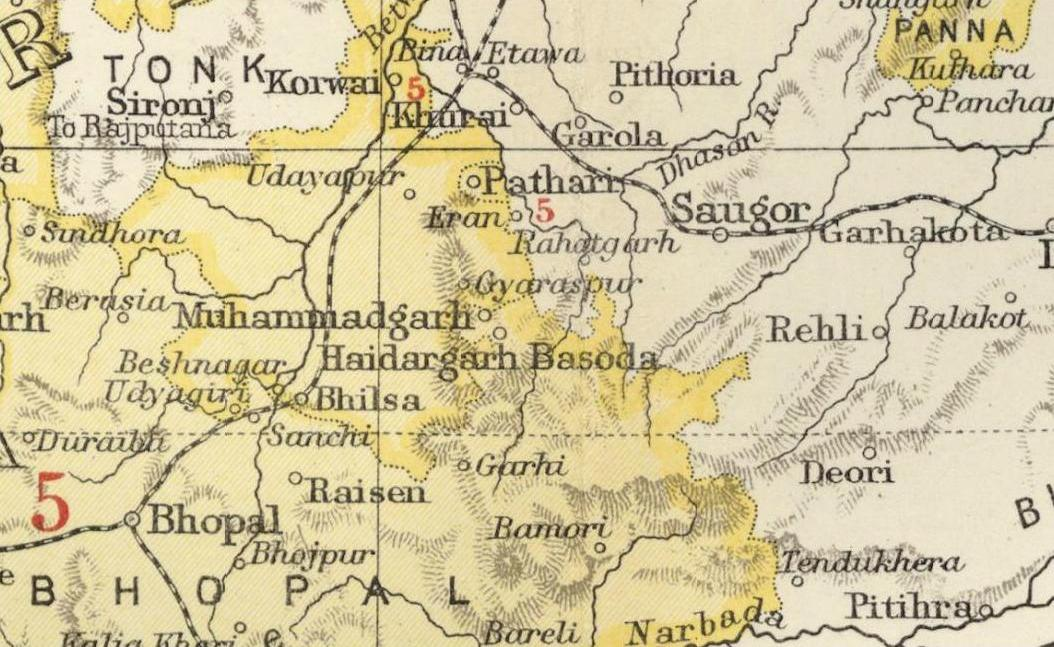
- Muhammadgarh State in the Imperial Gazetteer of India
- Area
  - 1931 Census of India: 70 km^{2} (27 sq mi)
- Population
  - 1931 Census of India: 2,658
- History
  - Established: 1842
  - Accession to the Indian Union: 1948
Succeeded by
India

Mohammadgarh State, also spelt as 'Muhammadgarh', was a former princely state in Central India, under the Bhopal Agency during the British Raj. It was situated in the Malwa Plateau. The state had an area of 29 square miles (75 km^{2}), and a population of 2,944 (as of 1901). Its headquarters were at Mohammadgarh town.

== History ==
Mohammadgarh state was established in 1842 with parts of Basoda and Kurwai states, when Ahsanullah Khan, the Nawab of Basoda divided his state between two sons, Bakaulla and Muhammad Khan. The latter became acknowledged as founder of the town of Muhammadgarh was founded by Muhammed Khan and named by his name, and state of Muhammadgarh. The rulers of Mohammadgarh refused to accept the overlordship of Gwalior State, retaining their independence.

The Nawab of Mohammadgarh was one of the original constituents of the Chamber of Princes, an institution established in 1920. Mohammadgarh state would remain a British protectorate until 1947, when its last ruler signed the accession to the Indian Union.

Although the rulers of this native state belonged to a Muslim Pathan dynasty, over 80% of the population of Muhammadgarh State followed the Hindu religion. On 15 June 1948 the state became part of Madhya Bharat, until all the princely states were abolished. Then the state's territory was integrated in Madhya Pradesh.

=== Rulers ===
The rulers of the Royal House of Mohammadgarh bore title of Nawab.

==== Nawabs ====
- 1842 – 1896 Nawab Hafiz Quli Khan
- 1896 – 1910 Nawab Hatim Quli Khan
- 1910 – 1942 Nawab Siddiq Quli Khan
- 1942 – 1948 Nawab Muhammad Sabir Quli Khan

== See also ==
- Bhopawar Agency
- List of Sunni Muslim dynasties
- Political integration of India
- Pathans of Madhya Pradesh
