= Kurwai tehsil =

- Tehsil
- Location in Madhya Pradesh Kurwai tehsil (India)
- Coordinates: 24°7′2″N 78°2′18″E
- Country: India
- State: Madhya Pradesh
- District: Vidisha district

Government
  - Type: Janpad Panchayat
  - Body: Council

Languages
  - Official: Hindi
- Time zone: UTC+5:30 (IST)
- ISO 3166 code: MP-IN

Kurwai tehsil is a tehsil in Vidisha district, Madhya Pradesh, India, and a subdivision of the administrative and revenue division of Vidisha district of Madhya Pradesh.
