= Sagoni =

Human settlement in India

Coordinates: 23.802°N 79.796°E

Sagoni is a town in Katni district, Madhya Pradesh, India.
