= Sironj tehsil =

- Tehsil
- Location in Madhya Pradesh Sironj tehsil (India)
- Coordinates: 24.1°N 77.7°E
- Country: India
- State: Madhya Pradesh
- District: Vidisha district

Government
  - Type: Janpad Panchayat
  - Body: Council

Languages
  - Official: Hindi
- Time zone: UTC+5:30 (IST)
- ISO 3166 code: MP-IN

Sironj tehsil is a tehsil in Vidisha district, Madhya Pradesh, India. It is also a subdivision of the administrative and revenue division of Vidisha district of Madhya Pradesh.
