= Ganeshganj =

Ganeshganj is a Town Teh-Lakhnadon Dist-Seoni of Madhya Pradesh, India.There is Connect With National Highway(NH44) Ganeshganj railway station under Jabalpur railway division.
