= Malkhedi =

Town in Sagar district, Madhya Pradesh, India

Malkhedi is a town in Sagar district, Madhya Pradesh, India.
