= Baghora =

Coordinates: 24°08′N 78°16′E

Baghora is a town near Khurai City in Sagar district in central India.
