= Kalhar =

Coordinates: 32°33′N 75°39′E

Kalhar is a town in Vidisha district, Madhya Pradesh, India.
