= Basoda State =

Coordinates: 23.85°N 77.93°E

Hydergarh Basoda State बसोदा रियासत
- Princely State
- 1753–1947
- Coat of arms

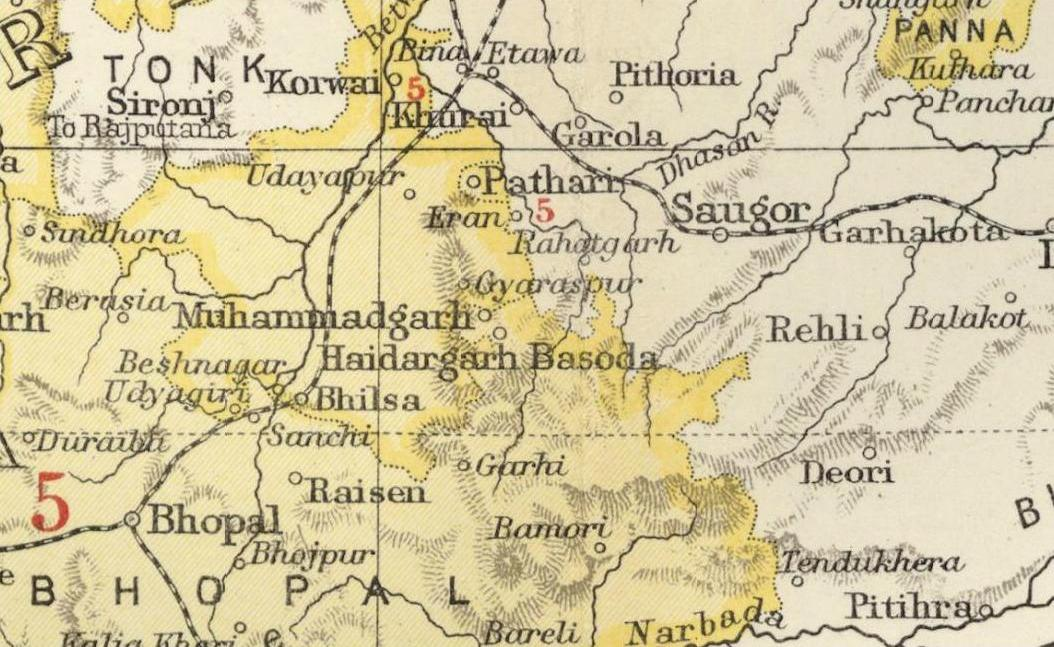
- Basoda State in the Imperial Gazetteer of India
- Area
  - 1901 Census of India: 104 km^{2} (40 sq mi)
- Population
  - 1901 Census of India: 4,897
- History
  - Established: 1753
  - Accession to the Indian Union: 1947
Succeeded by
India

Basoda State was a former princely state in Central India, part of the Bhopal Agency during the British Raj in India, with its capital at Haidergarh. It was also known as Nawab-Basoda or Haidargarh-Basoda in order to distinguish it from a place with the same name in Gwalior State.

The state was established in 1753 by Nawab Muhammad Ahsanullah Khan, son of Nawab Muhammad Diler Khan, who founded the Kurwai State. In 1822 Basoda became a British protectorate. In 1947, Nawab Masood Ali Khan, signed the accession to the Indian Union. After the death of Nawab Masood Ali Khan in 1976, the titular ruler of the Royal House of Basoda has been Nawab Kiswhar Ali Khan.

== Pashtun (Afghan) origin ==
The ruling family of Basoda State was of Pashtun (Afghan) origin, historically referred to in India as Pathans. Nawab Muhammad Diler Khan, founder of the neighbouring Kurwai State and father of Basoda’s founder Nawab Muhammad Ahsanullah Khan, was an Afghan adventurer who established his authority in Central India during the decline of Mughal power in the early eighteenth century. British administrative records and later historical studies consistently describe the Kurwai–Basoda ruling house as Afghan in origin, placing it within the broader Pashtun political presence in Central India, alongside Afghan-ruled states such as Bhopal.

== See also ==
- List of Pashtun empires and dynasties
- List of Sunni Muslim dynasties
- Political integration of India
- Pathans of Madhya Pradesh
