= Pathari State =

Princely state in British India

Coordinates: 23°56′N 78°12′E

Pathari State पठारी रियासत
- Princely State of British India
- 1794–1948
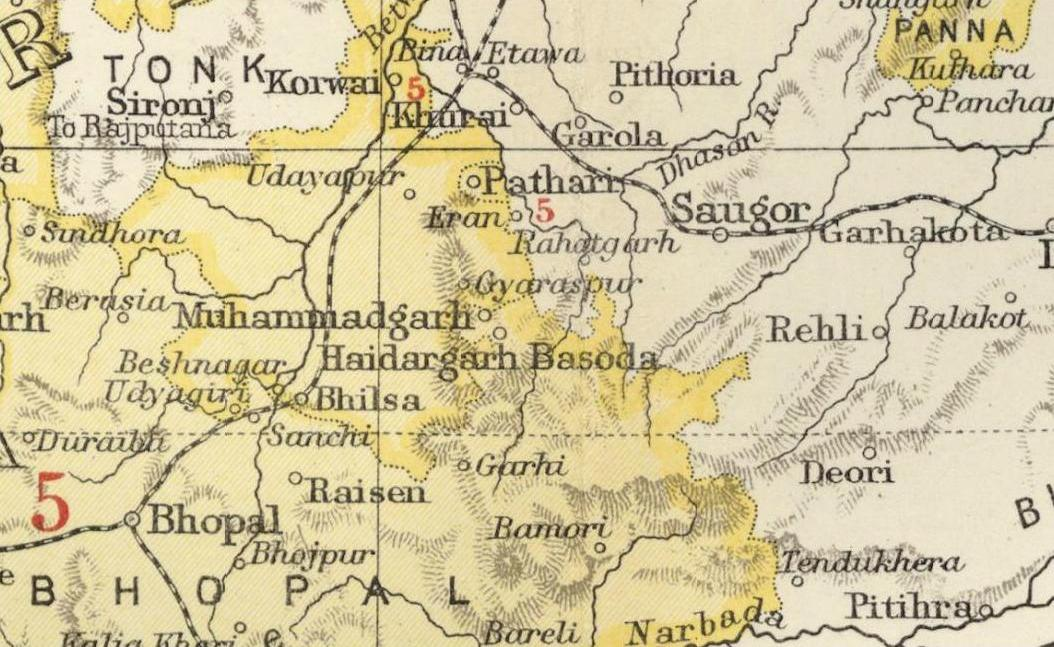
- Pathari State in the Imperial Gazetteer of India
- Area
  - 1901: 78 km^{2} (30 sq mi)
- Population
  - 1901: 2,704
- History
  - Established: 1794
  - Independence of India: 1948
Succeeded by
India
- Today part of: Madhya Pradesh, India

Pathari State is a princely state established by Nawab Hayder Mohammad Khan of the Orakzai clan of Mirazikhel Pashtuns. The State of Bhopal and Rahatgarh (later Rahatgarh State) became Pathari after the East India Company took control of Rahatgarh. It was founded in 1723 by Sardar Dost Muhammad Khan, from Tirah in Afghanistan, a descendant of the Mirazi Khel branch of the Warakzais (Orakzai) Pathans. He entered the service of Emperor Aurangzeb and was appointed Governor of Bhairsa. Taking advantage of the disintegration of the Mughal Empire, he declared his independence and established a separate state. Bhopal and Rahatgarh were divided between the two sons of Nawab Dost Mohammad Khan: Nawab Yar Mohammad Khan ruled Bhopal State, while Nawab Sultan Mohammad Khan took over Rahatgarh, which later became Pathari State.

== Rulers ==
- Nawab Hyder Mohammed Khan Sahib
- Nawab Abdul Raheem Khan Sahib (1872- 1942)
