= Pathans of Madhya Pradesh =

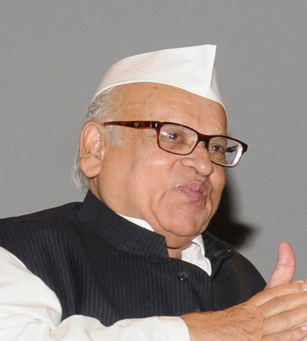
- Former erstwhile Governor of Uttarakhand from 2012 to 2015, Dr. Aziz Qureshi, who previously served as one of the state cabinet ministers of Madhya Pradesh as a member of the Indian National Congress

Regions with significant populations
- India (Madhya Pradesh and Chhattisgarh)

Languages
- Urdu • English • Hindi (Bagheli, Powari, Chhattisgarhi, Surgujia, Bundeli)

Religion
- Islam

Related ethnic groups
- Pashtun people

The Pathans of Madhya Pradesh are an Urdu-speaking Pashtun community settled in the present-day Indian state of Madhya Pradesh as well as a small minority of internal migrants and their descendants in neighbouring Chhattisgarh state, which was partitioned in 2000.

== History and origin ==
The early Pathan settlers in what became the princely state of Bhopal were known as Barru-kat, because they initially used reeds for roofing their houses, which became an aspect of their local architecture.

Bhopal became a hub for Pathan settlement, with others arriving to be soldiers in the army of the Begum of Bhopal. Immigration continued until the creation of Pakistan in 1947.

The state of Jaora was settled by Indian Rohillas from neighbouring Uttar Pradesh as well as other Indian Muslim freebooters of Uttar Pradesh, such as the Indian Sayyids.

== See also ==
- Pathans of Gujarat
- Pathans of Uttar Pradesh
