= Salamatpur =

Salamatpur(Sunari) Sanatanpur
- Town
- Location of Salamatpur in India
- Coordinates: 23°30′N 77°42′E
- Country: India
- State: Madhya Pradesh
- District: Raisen

Population (2011)
  - Total: 5,017

Languages
  - Official: Hindi
- Time zone: UTC+5:30 (IST)
- Vehicle registration: MP-38

Salamatpur is a town in the Raisen district of Madhya Pradesh, India. It is situated 8 km from Sanchi. This place is situated between Bhopal and Vidisha.

== Geography ==
Salamatpur is Located on 23°30′N 77°42′E. It's is Located on Vidisha Highway Road 20 km away from Raisen. 464651 is pin code of Salamatpur.

== Demographics ==
As per Population Census of India 2011 Salamatpur (Sunari) Town has population of 5,017 of which 2,658 are males while 2,359 are females and total 1036 families residing.

== Transportation ==
Agra-Bhopal section passing through Here, Some Passenger train Halts here. The station Code is SMT, Here is 3 platform in the Station. The Station is Operating by Bhopal railway division.
