= Kurwai =

- Town
- Location within Madhya Pradesh Location within India
- Coordinates: 24°7′2″N 78°2′18″E
- Country: India
- State: Madhya Pradesh
- District: Vidisha

Population (2019)
  - Total: 24,000 (approx)

Languages
  - Official: Hindi
- Time zone: UTC+5:30 (IST)

Kurwai is a town and a Nagar Panchayat in Vidisha district in the Indian state of Madhya Pradesh. its also tehsil headquarter and assembly constituency.

== History ==
The town of Kurwai was founded by Mohm Diler Khan of Kurwai State in 1715.

Kurwai was formerly a Muslim princely state of British India. In 1892, the state was 368 km^{2} in area, and at the time boasted a population of 30,631. The state, which came under British sovereignty in the early nineteenth century, was founded in 1713 by Mohammed Diler Khan, an Afghan pashtun from the Orakzai tribe rising through merit in the Mughal Army. Diler Khan was a cousin of Dost Muhammad Khan, who founded the nearby Bhopal State. His descendants ruled the state until 15 June 1948, when the last ruling Nawab acceded to the Indian Government. Kurwai became part of the newly created state of Madhya Bharat, and was added to Vidisha District. Madhya Bharat was merged into Madhya Pradesh on 1 November 1956.

== Geography ==
Kurwai is located at 24.11°N 78.03°E. It has an average elevation of 483 metres (1584 feet). Kurwai is Located 140 km away from the state capital Bhopal and banks of Betwa River.

== Demographics ==
As of a 2011 census, Kurwai Tehsil has a population of 158909. 52% of the Kurwai population is made up by males, while 48% is made up by females. Kurwai has an average literacy rate of 62.28%, higher than the national average of 59.5%: male literacy is 70.29%, and female literacy is 53.37%. The sex-ratio of Kurwai Tehsil is around 899 compared to 931 which is average of Madhya Pradesh state.The total area of Kurwai is 839.07 km^{2} with population density of 189 per km^{2}.Out of total population, 50% of population lives in Urban area and 60% lives in Rural area.There are 226 villages and 1 town in Kurwai Tehsil.

== Assembly constituency ==
Kurwai is one of the 230 Vidhan Sabha (Legislative Assembly) constituencies of Madhya Pradesh state in central India. This constituency is reserved for the candidates belonging to the Scheduled castes since 1977, following the delimitation of the Legislative Assembly constituencies.

== Transport ==
The nearest airport is Bhopal. The nearest railway station is Mandi Bamora and the nearest junction is Bina Junction.
