= Vidisha district =

Coordinates: 23°31′12″N 77°48′36″E

- District of Madhya Pradesh
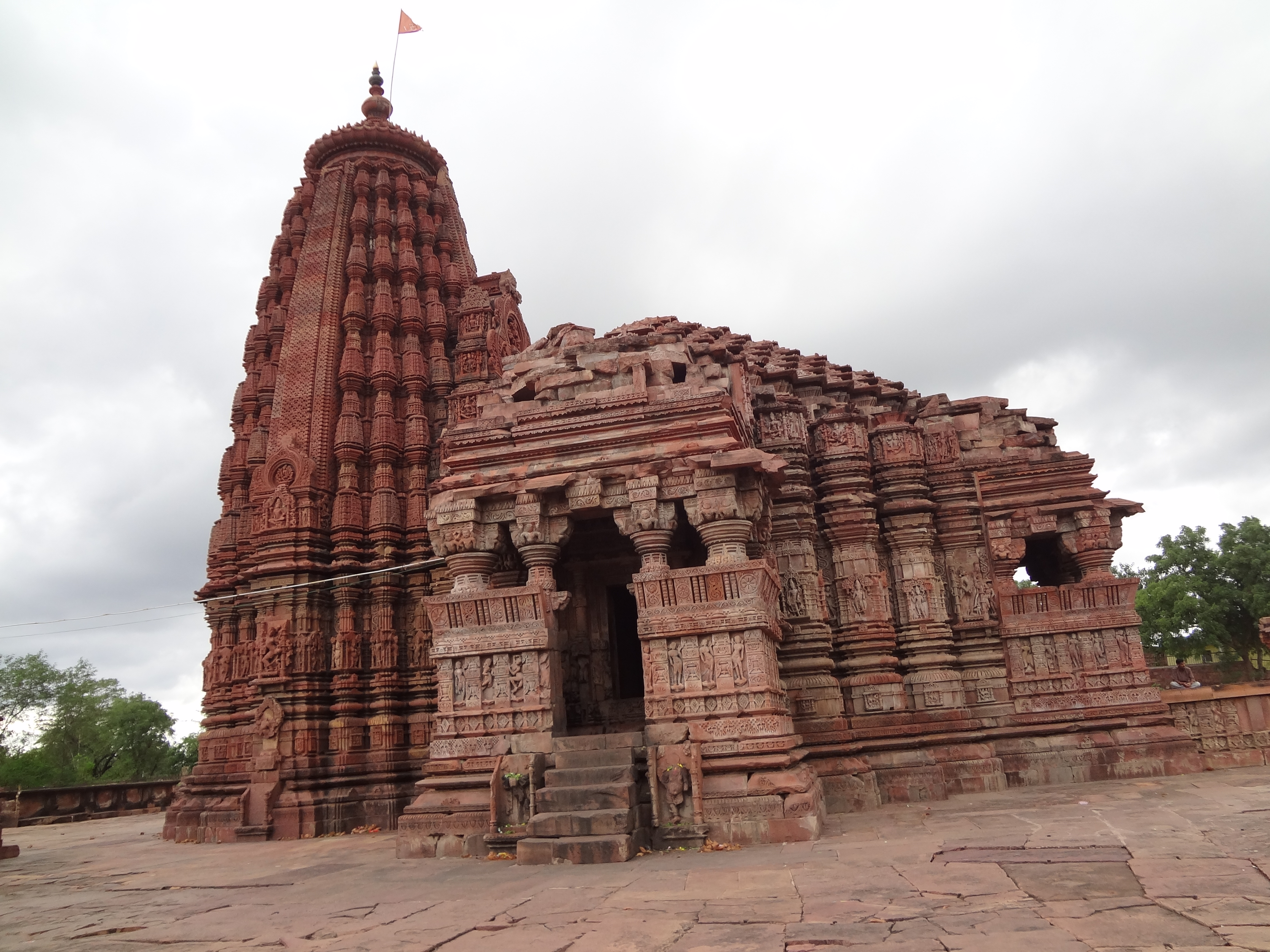
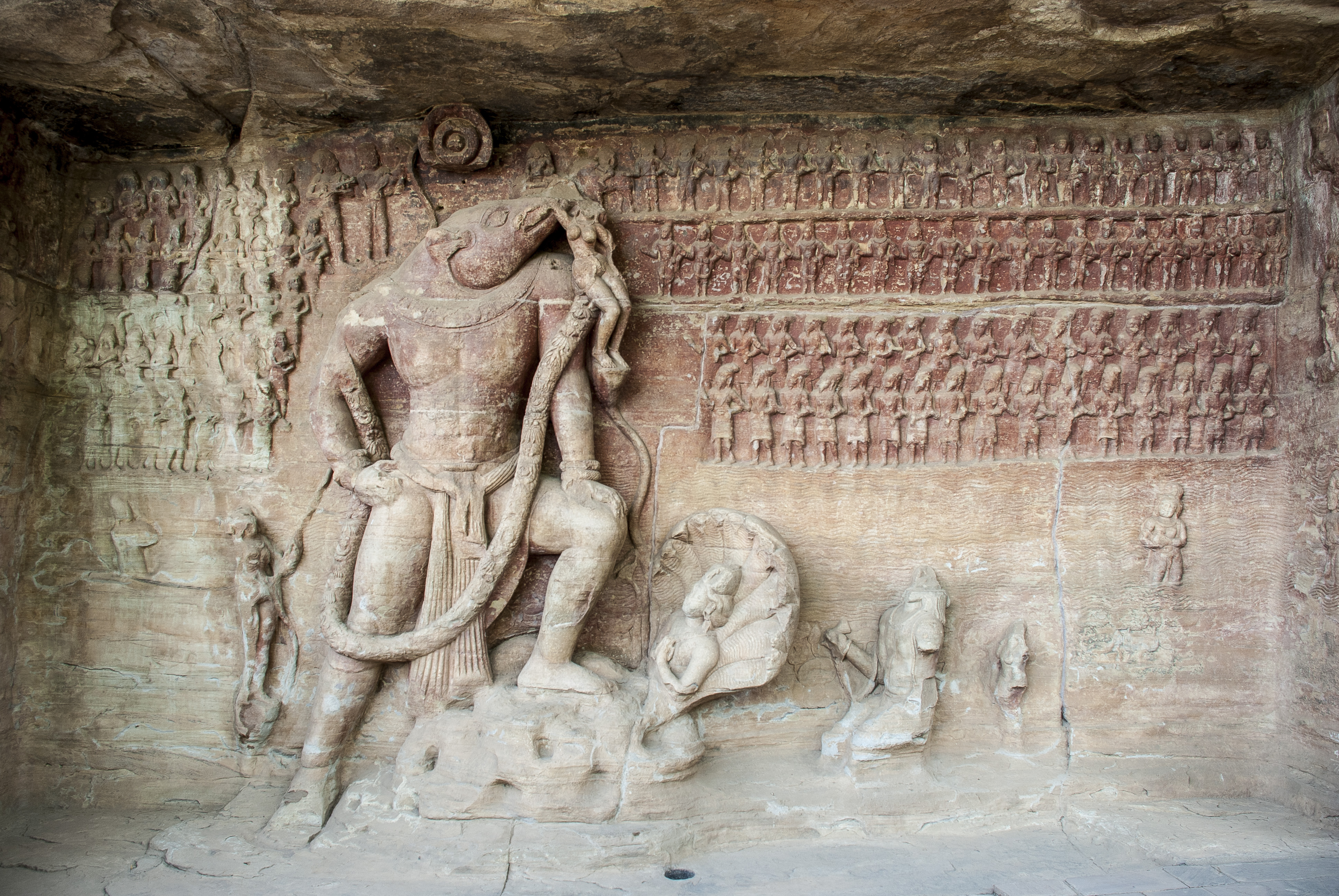
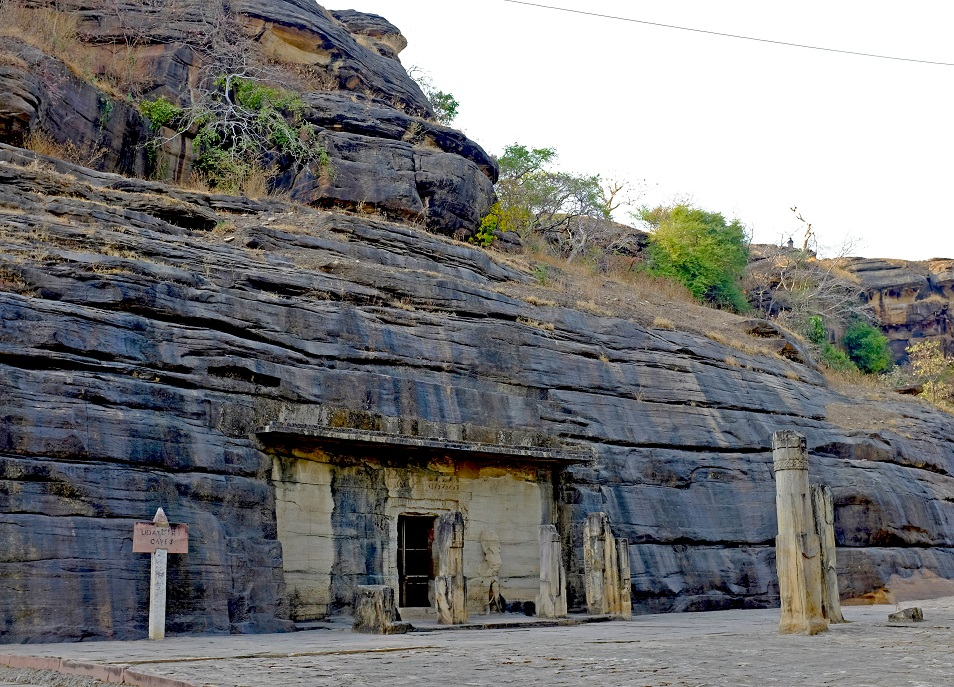
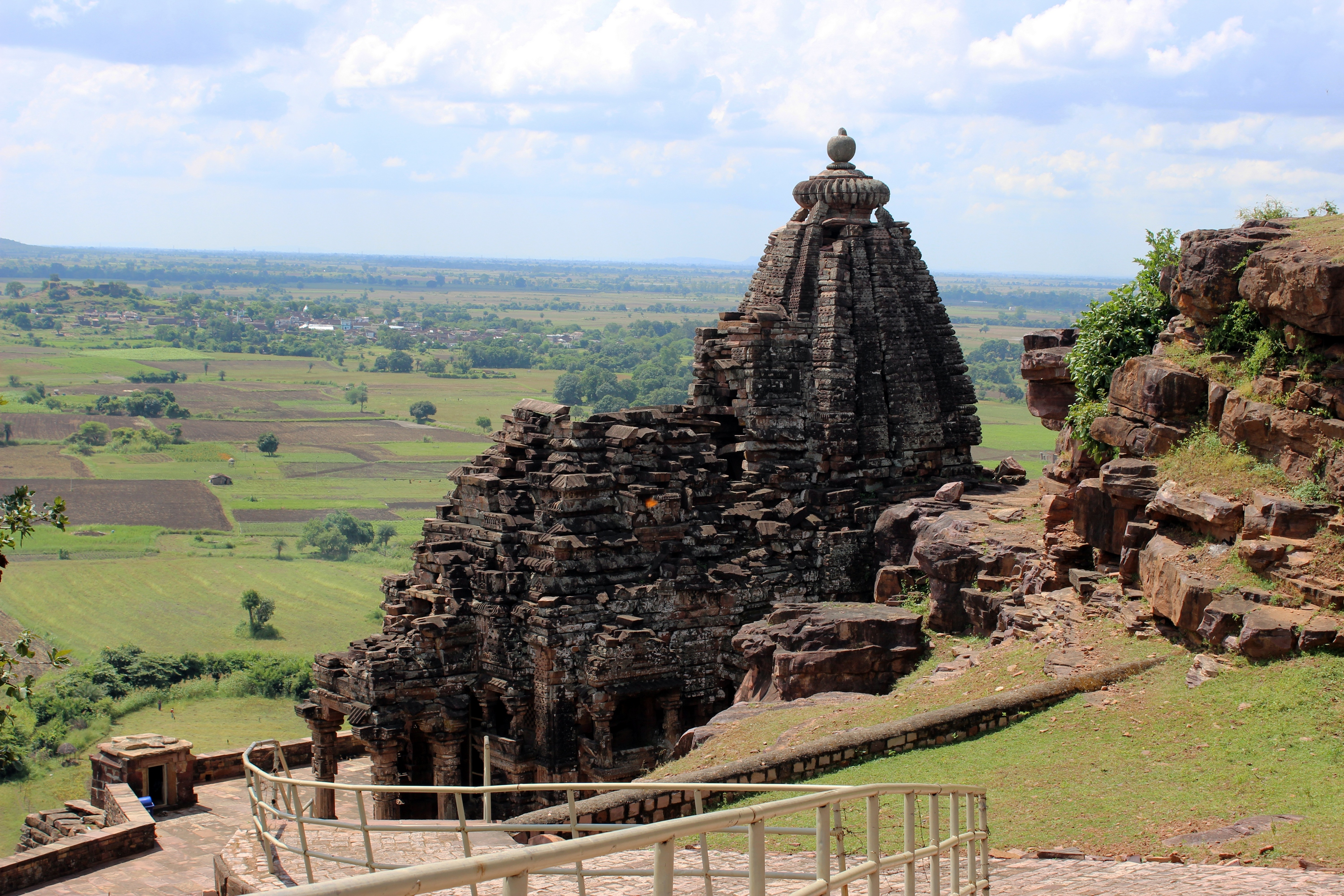
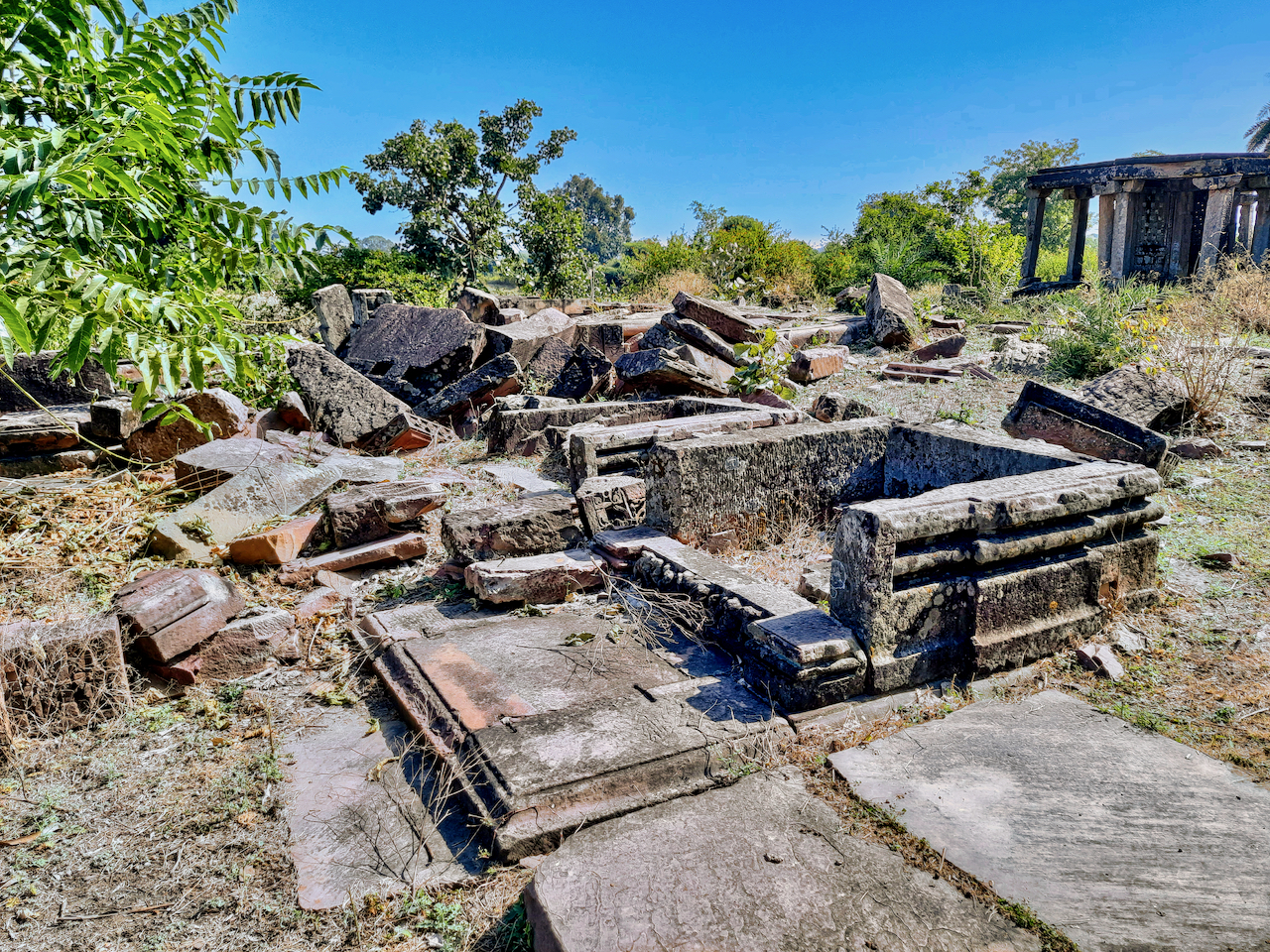
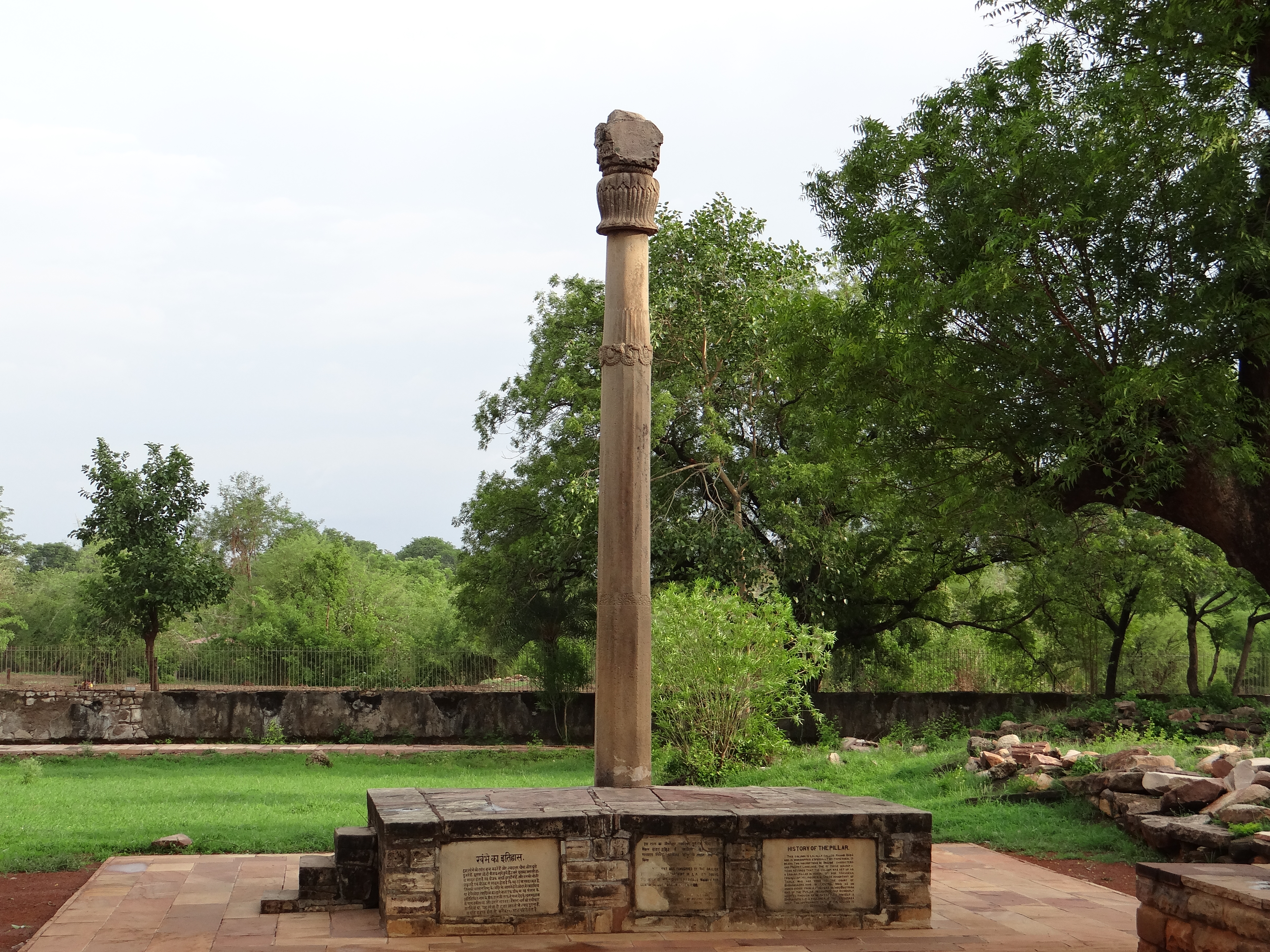
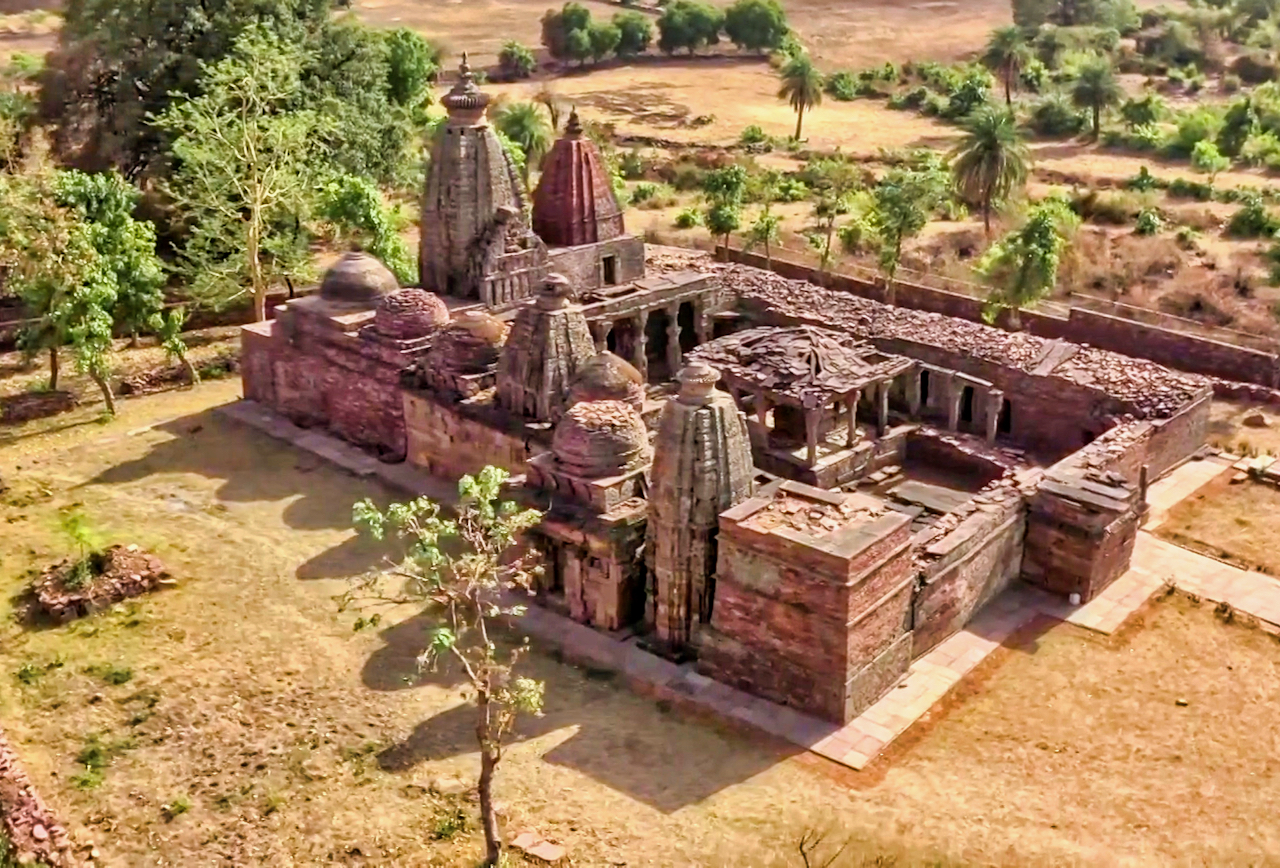
- Clockwise from top-left: Udayeshwar Temple in Udaypur, Ancient Sculpture of Varahavtar in Udayagiri, Udayagiri Caves, Maladevi Temple in Gyaraspur, Dashavatar Temple at Badoh-Pathari, Heliodorus pillar in Vidisha, Pathari Jain temples

- Location of Vidisha district in Madhya Pradesh
- Country: India
- State: Madhya Pradesh
- Division: Bhopal
- Headquarters: Vidisha
- Subdivisions: C.D. Blocks (7): 1 • Lateri; 2 • Sironj; 3 • Kurwai; 4 • Nateran; 5 • Basoda; 6 • Vidisha; 7 • Gyaraspur; Tehsils (12): 1 • Basoda; 2 • Gulabganj; 3 • Gyaraspur; 4 • Kurwai; 5 • Lateri; 6 • Nateran; 7 • Pathari; 8 • Shamshabad; 9 • Sironj; 10 • Tyonda; 11 • Vidisha; 12 • Vidisha Nagar

Area
  - Total: 7,371 km^{2} (2,846 sq mi)

Population
  - Total: 1,458,875
  - Density: 197.9/km^{2} (512.6/sq mi)
- Time zone: UTC+05:30 (IST)
- Website: vidisha.nic.in

Vidisha district (Hindi pronunciation: [ʋɪd̪ɪʃaː]) is in Madhya Pradesh state, in central India. The city of Vidisha is the administrative headquarters of the district.

== Geography ==
The district is bounded by the districts of Ashoknagar to the northeast, Sagar to the east, Raisen to the south, Bhopal to the southwest, and Guna to the northwest.

Vidisha district lies on the Vindhyachal Plateau off the main Vindhyachal Range. The plateau slopes from south to north and is drained by a number of rivers – the Betwa, the Bina and the Sindh. These rivers flow between spur flanges of the Vindhyachal Range, that spread out on the Malwa Plateau.

The district lies between 23^{0} 20’ and 24^{0} 22' north latitudes, and 77^{0}16’ and 78^{0}18’ east longitudes. It covers an area of 7,371 km^{2}.

The district is home to the historic city of Besnagar and the Buddhist stupa at Sanchi.

== History ==
Vidisha was the second capital of the Shunga Empire during the later years. The district was created as "Bhilsa District" in 1904 by joining the tehsils of Vidisha (also known as Bhilsa) and Basoda, but not Basoda State, which were then part of Gwalior state. After India's independence in 1947, the former princely state of Gwalior became part of Madhya Bharat state, which was formed in 1948. The Bhilsa District was enlarged in 1949 by the addition of the small princely state of Kurwai State. The district took its present form in 1956, when Madhya Bharat state, Bhopal State, and the tehsil of Sironj, then part of Rajasthan state and previously part of the princely state of Tonk, were both merged into Madhya Pradesh state. Sironj tehsil and the small pargana of Piklone from Bhopal state were merged into Vidisha District.

== Demographics ==
Historical population
Year	Pop.	±% p.a.
1901	227,998	—
1911	296,966	+2.68%
1921	348,047	+1.60%
1931	345,818	−0.06%
1941	383,347	+1.04%
1951	386,075	+0.07%
1961	489,213	+2.40%
1971	658,427	+3.02%
1981	783,098	+1.75%
1991	970,388	+2.17%
2001	1,214,857	+2.27%
2011	1,458,875	+1.85%

According to the 2011 census Vidisha District has a population of 1,458,875, roughly equal to the nation of Eswatini or the US state of Hawaii. This gives it a ranking of 341st in India (out of a total of 640). The district has a population density of 198 inhabitants per square kilometre (510/sq mi) . Its population growth rate over the decade 2001-2011 was 20.03%. Vidisha has a sex ratio of 897 females for every 1,000 males, and a literacy rate of 72.08%. 23.28% of the population live in urban areas. Scheduled Castes and Scheduled Tribes make up 20.03% and 4.63% of the population respectively.

Languages of Vidisha district (2011)
1. Hindi (95.0%)
2. Urdu (4.57%)
3. Others (0.47%)

At the time of the 2011 Census of India, 94.96% of the population in the district spoke Hindi and 4.57% Urdu as their first language.

Religions in Vidisha district (2011)
Religion	Percent
Hinduism	88.25%
Jainism	1.27%
Islam	10.25%
Other or not stated	0.23%

== Tourist places ==
- Neelkantheshwar or Udayeshwar Temple, Udaypur
- Maladevi Temple, Gyaraspur
- Udayagiri Caves, Udayagiri
- Heliodorus pillar, Vidisha
- Vidisha District Museum
- Lohangi Pir, Vidisha
- Hindola Torana, Gyaraspur
- Gadarmal Devi Temple, Pathari
