= Ganj Basoda =

District ganj basoda
- City
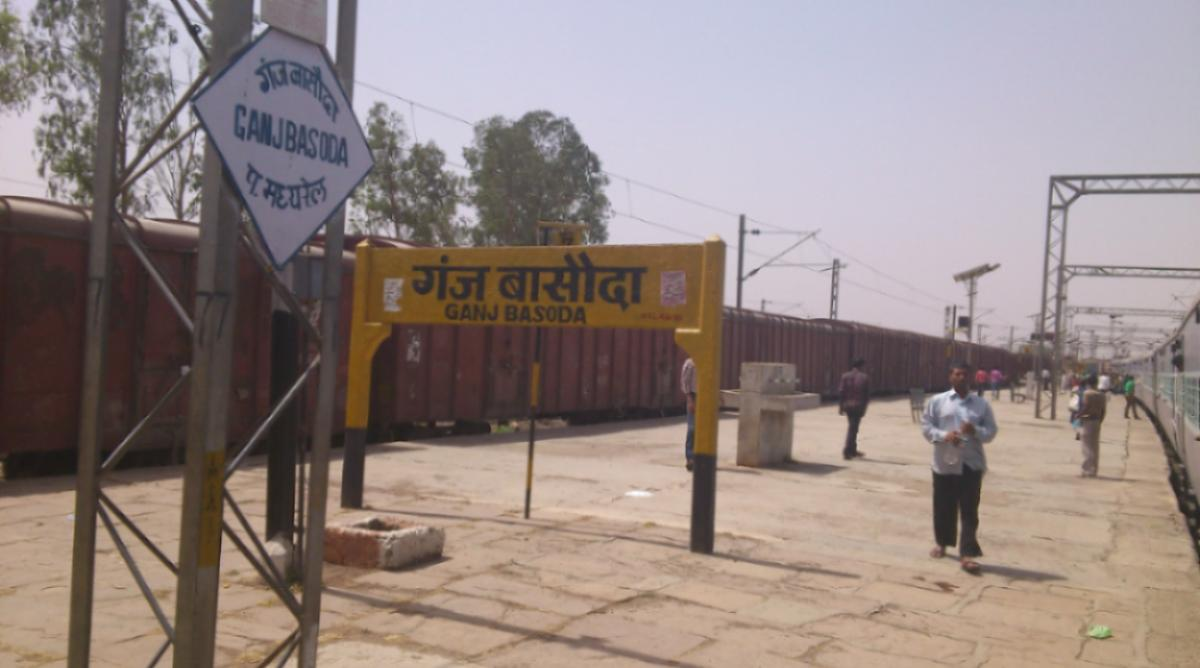
- Railway Station in Basoda

- Location in Madhya Pradesh, India
- Coordinates: 23.85°N 77.93°E
- Country: India
- State: Madhya Pradesh
- District: Vidisha
- Tehsil: Ganj Basoda tehsil

Government
  - Member of Parliament: Shivraj Singh Chauhan
  - Member of Assembly: Mr. Harisingh Raghuwanshi
  - Mayor: Mrs. Shashi Anil Yadav
- Elevation: 416 m (1,365 ft)

Population (2019)
  - Total: 132,590
  - Density: 700/km^{2} (1,800/sq mi)

Languages
  - Official: Hindi
- Time zone: UTC+5:30 (IST)
- PIN: 464221
- Telephone code: 91-7594
- Vehicle registration: MP-40
- Website: nagarpalikaganjbasoda.co.in

Ganj Basoda, also known as Basoda, is a city and municipality in the Indian state of Madhya Pradesh.

== Geography ==
Basoda is located at 23.85°N 77.95°E, very near to the centre of India. It has an average elevation of 399 metres (1309 feet).

== Politics ==
Basoda Assembly constituency is one of the 230 Vidhan Sabha (Legislative Assembly) constituencies of Madhya Pradesh state in central India. Basoda (constituency number 145) is one of the 5 Vidhan Sabha constituencies located in Vidisha district. This constituency presently covers Basoda Municipality and some of the Basoda tehsil's villages of the district with 98, Gyaraspur tehsil's 132 villages and Tyonda tehsil's 104 villages.

== See also ==
- Basoda State
