= Saugor railway station =

Railway station in Madhya Pradesh, India

Saugor
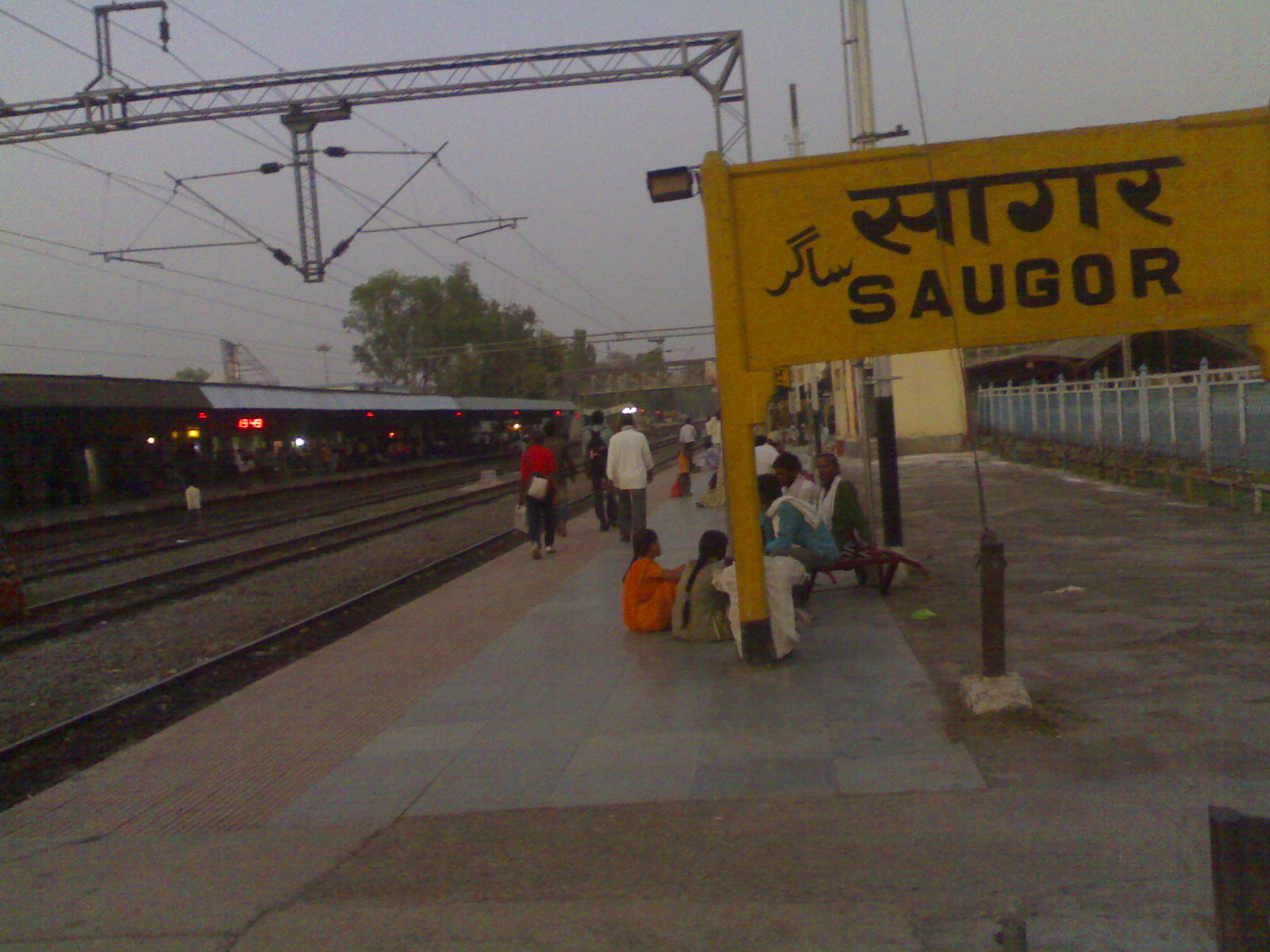

General information
- Location: Sagar, Sagar district, Madhya Pradesh; India
- Coordinates: 23°50′52″N 78°44′36″E
- Elevation: 519 metres (1,703 ft)
- System: Indian Railways station
- Owner: Indian Railways
- Operator: West Central Railway
- Line: Bina–Katni line
- Platforms: 2
- Tracks: 4

Construction
- Structure type: Standard (on ground)
- Parking: Yes

Other information
- Status: Functioning
- Station code: SGO
- Zone(s): West Central Railway
- Division(s): Jabalpur

Services
Preceding station	Indian Railways	Following station
Ratona towards ?	West Central Railway zone Bina–Katni line	Makronia towards ?
Location
- Location within Madhya Pradesh Location within India Location within Asia
- Interactive map

Saugor (station code: SGO) is a railway station in Sagar city in Madhya Pradesh. It is operated by the West Central Railway, with its headquarters at Jabalpur. Saugor is a 'A' Category railway station of West Central Railway zone of Indian Railways. Saugor is a major railway station of Bina–Katni line. The station consists of two platforms. Passenger, Express and Superfast trains halt here.

== History ==
Katni Bina line was established in the year 1923 before India got independence. It was started with a single track which was later converted to double track in 1982. It got electrified in year 1994-95.

== Development ==
Sagar Railway Station will be developed under Amrat Bharat Scheme.

== Structure ==
Its give service to sagar city. It is located at 519 m above sea level and has two platforms.

== Major trains ==
- Durg–Hazrat Nizamuddin Humsafar Express
- Bandra Terminus–Gorakhpur Humsafar Express
- Dayodaya Express
- Bhopal–Damoh Rajya Rani Express
- Katni Bina Passenger
- Somnath–Jabalpur Express (via Bina)
- Madhya Pradesh Sampark Kranti Express
- Jabalpur–H.Nizamuddin Express
- Rewanchal Express
- Kamayani Express
- Kshipra Express
- Bhopal–Bilaspur Express
- Vindhyachal Express
- Bhopal–Lucknow Express
- Shalimar–Udaipur City Weekly Express
- Kolkata–Madar Express
- Hirakud Express
- Kalinga Utkal Express
- Rewa–Dr. Ambedkar Nagar Express
- Howrah–Bhopal Weekly Express
- Bilaspur–Itwari Intercity Superfast Express
- Bhopal–Singrauli Superfast Express
- Durg–Jammu Tawi Superfast Express
- Chhattisgarh Sampark Kranti Superfast Express
- Damoh–Bina Passenger
- Damoh-Kota Passenger
- Singrauli–Hazrat Nizamuddin Superfast Express
- Bhagalpur–Ajmer Express
- Kolkata-Ahmedabad Weekly Express

- Jabalpur Katra Durgawati Express
- Durg–Ajmer Express
- Udhampur Durg weekly express

== Proposed rail line ==
- Sagar Kareli Chhindwara New Railline: Survey of new rail line Chhindwara–Kareli–Sagour rail line is in progress. This will help in connecting villages of Chhindwara, Narsinghpur and Sagar districts and help in the development of Satpura, Mahakaushal and Bundelkhand area respectively as a whole. This will provide and alternative north–south route via Lalitpur–Sagar–Narsinghpur–Chhindwara–Nagpur route alternative to Bina–Bhopal–Itarsi–Amla–Betul–Nagpur route thereby decreasing the distance between north and south by nearly 300 km. Kareli railway station will serve as an alternative to Itarsi Junction. This railway line will help in connecting Itarsi–Narsinghpur–Jabalpur–Katni stretch and Itarsi–Bhopal–Bina–Saugor–Katni stretch of West Central Railways. Recently CCEA also sanctioned Gadarwara-Indore new rail line via Budni. These two rail lines in combination will reduce the distance of the state's financial capital Indore from District like Jabalpur, Narsinghpur, Hoshangabad, Sagar, Chhindwara which will help in industrial and economic development of these regions"
- Bhopal-Sagar-Chhatarpur New Railline

== Trains waiting for approval ==
- Saugor–Katni Passenger
- Saugor–Chirmiri Passenger
- Bhopal–Saugor Passenger by extending Bhopal–Bina Passenger to Saugor
- Saugor-Nagpur Express
- Saugor-Lalitpur-Khajuraho Passenger

== See also ==
- Khurai
- Makronia
