= Bhopal–Damoh Rajya Rani Express =

Rajya Rani Express
Overview
- Service type: Rajya Rani Express
- First service: 15 September 2011; 14 years ago
- Current operator: West Central Railways

Route
- Termini: Bhopal (BPL); Damoh (DMO)
- Stops: 9
- Distance travelled: 291 km (181 mi)
- Average journey time: 4 hours 50 minutes
- Service frequency: Daily
- Train number: 22161 / 22162

On-board services
- Classes: General Unreserved, AC 2 Tier, AC 3 Tier, Chair Car
- Seating arrangements: Yes
- Sleeping arrangements: No
- Catering facilities: E-catering
- Other facilities: Below the seats

Technical
- Rolling stock: ICF coach
- Track gauge: 1,676 mm (5 ft 6 in)
- Operating speed: 61 km/h (38 mph) average including halts
Route map
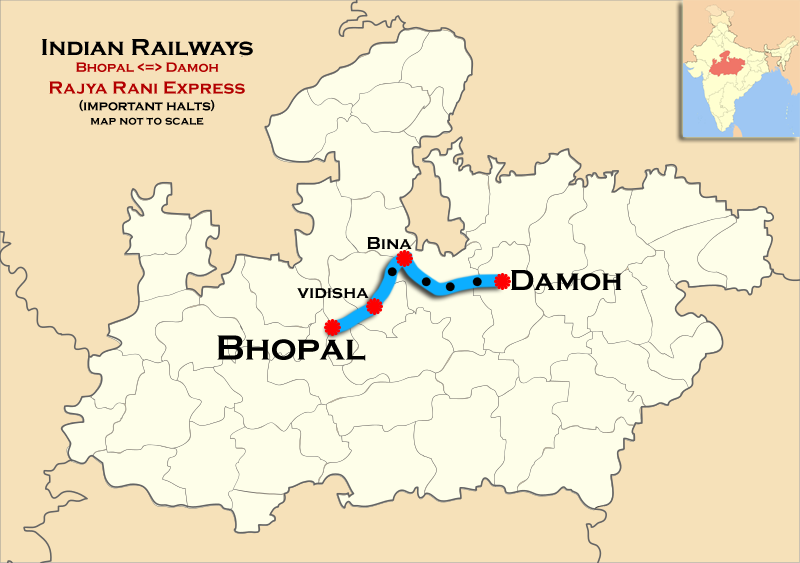
- Rajya Rani Express (Bhopal–Damoh) route map

The 22161 / 22162 Rajya Rani Express is a daily Intercity Express train service offered by West Central Railways. It runs between Bhopal Junction railway station of Bhopal, the state capital city of Madhya Pradesh and Damoh in the same state.

== Number and nomenclature ==
- 22161 – Bhopal to Damoh
- 22162 – Damoh to Bhopal

== Route and halts ==
The train goes via. Bina–Katni rail route. It halts at;

- Bhopal Junction
- Vidisha
- Ganj Basoda
- Mandi Bamora
- Bina Junction
- Khurai
- Saugor
- Makronia
- Ganeshganj
- Patharia
- Damoh

== Traction ==
Both trains are hauled by a Itarsi based WAP-7 / WAP-4 locomotive from Bhopal Junction to Damoh and vice versa.

== Coach composition ==
- 1 AC Chair Car
- 6 Non AC reserved Chair Car
- 5 Unreserved General Coach
- 2 SLR

== See also ==
- Damoh–Kota Passenger
