= Bina–Katni 505 Passenger =

Train in India

505 (Paanch Sau Paanch)
Overview
- Service type: passenger
- Locale: Madhya Pradesh
- Current operator: West Central Railway

Route
- Termini: Bina Junction railway station Katni Junction
- Stops: 25
- Distance travelled: 200 km (120 mi)
- Average journey time: 9 hours
- Service frequency: Daily
- Train number: 51601DN / 51602UP

On-board services
- Classes: AC Chair Cars, AC 3 Tier, First Class, Sleeper 3 Tier, Unreserved
- Seating arrangements: Yes
- Sleeping arrangements: Yes

Technical
- Operating speed: 35 km/h (22 mph) average with halts

The Bina - Katni Passenger or Paanch Sau Paanch (505) is a passenger Train of the Indian Railways, which runs between Bina Junction railway station railway station and Katni South railway station, in the Central Indian state Madhya Pradesh

== Arrival and departure ==
- Train no.51601 departs from Bina, and reaches Katni
- Train no.51602 departs from Katni, and reaches Bina

== Route and halts ==
The train travels via Saugor. The important halts of the train include:

- Bina Junction railway station
- Malkhedi
- Khurai Baghora
- Khurai
- Khurai Sumreri
- Jeruwakheda
- Isarwara
- Nariaoli
- Saugor
- Saugor Makronia
- Ganeshganj
- Patharia
- Aslana
- Damoh
- Bandakpur
- Sagoni
- KATNI JUNCTION

== Coach composite ==
The train consists of 18 coaches :

- 1 AC 3 Tier
- 2 AC Chair Car
- 1 First Class
- 4 Sleeper Coaches

/Chair Car Coach

- 8 Unreserved
- 1 Ladies/Handy Capped
- 1 Luggage/Brake Van

LOCO-SLR-GS-GS-B1-C1-C2-D1-D2-D3-D4-FC1-GS-GS-GS-GS-GS-GS-SLRD

== Average speed and frequency ==
The train runs with an average speed of 35 km/h. The train runs daily.

== Loco link ==
The train is hauled by ET WAM-4 electrical engine. And since WAM-4 was discontinued it was replaced by WAP-7

== Rake maintenance & sharing ==
The train is maintained by the Bina Coaching Depot.

== See also ==
- Vindhyachal Express
- Indore Junction
- Bhopal Junction
