= Bina–Katni line =

Railway route in Madhya Pradesh, India

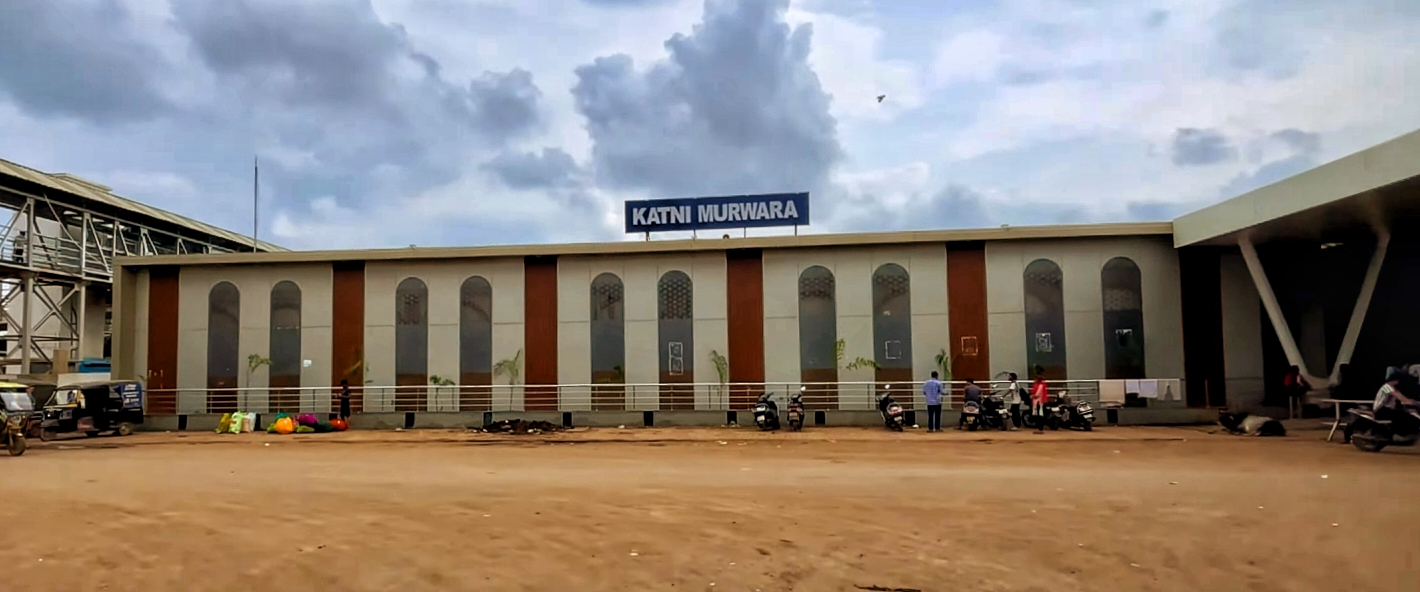
- Katni Murwara junction is an important railway station on the Bina–Katni line

Overview
- Status: Operational
- Owner: Indian Railways
- Locale: Madhya Pradesh, India
- Termini: Bina Junction; Katni Junction

Service
- Operator: West Central Railway
- Depot: New Katni
- Rolling stock: WDM-2, WDM-3A, WDG-3A, WDG-3C, WAG-5, WAG-7

Technical
- Line length: 262 km (163 mi)
- Track gauge: 5 ft 6 in (1,676 mm) broad gauge
- Electrification: Yes
- Operating speed: 100 km/h (62 mph)

The Bina–Katni line is a railway route connecting Bina (Bina Junction) and Katni (New Katni Junction) in Madhya Pradesh, India.

== History ==
The line was established in the year 1923 before India got independence, making it one of the oldest train routes in India. It was started with a single track which was later converted to double track in 1982. It got electrified in year 1994–95.

== Important trains passing through ==
The line serves important stations for both goods as well as passenger express and mail trains. The important trains include :

- Bhopal–Rewa Rewanchal Express
- Bhopal–Bilaspur Express
- Bhopal–Itarsi Vindhyachal Express
- Bhopal–Lucknow Express
- Bhopal–Damoh Rajya Rani Express
- Rewa–Dr. Ambedkar Nagar Express
- Durg–Jammu Tawi Express
- Howrah–Bhopal Weekly Express
- Indore–Howrah Shipra Express
- Bhopal–Singrauli Superfast Express
- Bilaspur–Itwari Intercity Superfast Express
- Somnath–Jabalpur Express (via Itarsi)
- Jabalpur–Hazrat Nizamuddin MP Express
- Jabalpur–Hazrat Nizamuddin Gondwana Express
- Jabalpur–Jaipur Express
- Jabalpur–Jammu Tawi Durgavati Express
- Jaipur–Durg Express
- Lokmanya Tilak Terminus (Mumbai)–Varanasi Kamayani Express
- Puri–Haridwar Kalinga utkal Express
- Amritsar–Vishakhapattanam Hirakund Express
- Shalimar–Udaipur City Weekly Express
- Ajmer–Kolkata Express
- Bina–Katni 505 Passenger
- Damoh–Kota Passenger
- Bina–Damoh Passenger
- Saugor–Katni Passenger
- Saugor–Chirmiri Passenger
- Kolkata(KOAA)-Ahmedabad(ADI) Weekly Express //19414

== Stations on this railway section ==
On the route, the following are the main railway stations :

- Bina Junction
- Baghora
- Khurai
- Sumreri
- Jeruwakheda
- Isarwara
- Nariaoli
- Ratona
- Saugor
- Makronia
- Lidhora Khurd
- Girwar
- Dangidhar
- Ganeshganj
- Patharia
- Aslana
- Damoh
- Karhiya Bhiadeli
- Bandakpur
- Ghatera
- Golapatti
- Sagaoni
- Ratangaon
- Salaia
- Bakhleta
- Rithi
- Patohan
- Hardua
- Majhgawanphatak
- Katni Murwara Junction
- New Katni Junction (Madhya Pradesh)
