= Aslana railway station =

Railway station in Madhya Pradesh

Aslana

General information
- Location: Aslana, Damoh, Damoh district, Madhya Pradesh; India
- Coordinates: 23°51′38″N 79°19′10″E
- Elevation: 373 metres (1,224 ft)
- System: Indian Railways station
- Owner: Indian Railways
- Operator: West Central Railway
- Line: Bina–Katni line
- Platforms: 3
- Tracks: Triple Electric-Line

Construction
- Structure type: Standard (on ground)
- Parking: Yes

Other information
- Status: Functioning
- Station code: ANA
- Zone(s): West Central Railway
- Division(s): Jabalpur

Services
Preceding station	Indian Railways	Following station
Patharia towards ?	West Central Railway zone Bina–Katni line	Damoh towards ?
Location
- Location within Madhya Pradesh Location within India
- Interactive map

Aslana railway station is a railway station in located on Bina–Katni railway line operated by the West Central Railway under Jabalpur railway division. It is situated at Aslana, Damoh in Damoh district in the Indian state of Madhya Pradesh.

== History ==
Katni Bina line was established in 1923. It was started with a single track which was later converted to double track in 1982. It got electrified during 1994–95.
