= Khurai railway station =

Railway station in Madhya Pradesh

Khurai
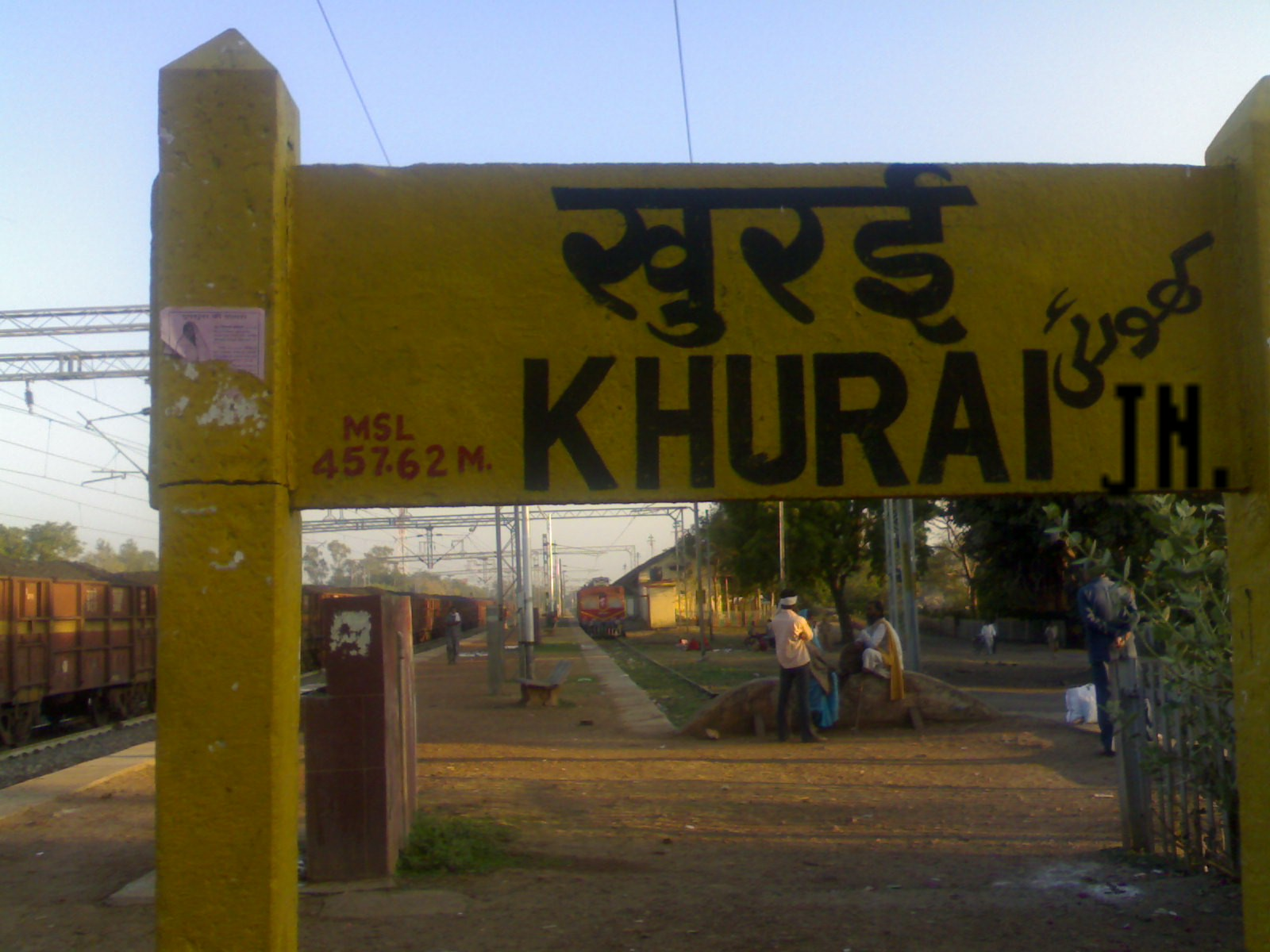

General information
- Location: Khurai, Sagar district, Madhya Pradesh; India
- Coordinates: 24°03′08″N 78°19′51″E
- Elevation: 440 metres (1,440 ft)
- System: Indian Railways station
- Owner: Indian Railways
- Operator: West Central Railway
- Line: Bina–Katni line
- Platforms: 3
- Tracks: 3

Construction
- Structure type: Standard (on ground)
- Parking: Yes

Other information
- Status: Functioning
- Station code: KYE
- Zone(s): West Central Railway
- Division(s): Jabalpur
Location
- Location within India Location within Madhya Pradesh

Khurai railway station is a railway station in Khurai city of Madhya Pradesh. Its code is KYE. It serves Khurai city. The station consists of three platforms. Passenger, Express and Superfast trains halt here.

== Structure ==
Its give service to khurai city . It is located at 519 m above sea level and has five platforms.

== Major trains ==
- Dayodaya Express
- Bhopal–Damoh Rajya Rani Express
- Katni Bina Passenger
- Somnath–Jabalpur Express (via Bina)
- Madhya Pradesh Sampark Kranti Express
- Jabalpur–H.Nizamuddin Express
- Rewanchal Express
- Kamayani Express
- Kshipra Express
- Bhopal–Bilaspur Express
- Vindhyachal Express
- Bhopal–Lucknow Express
