= Bhopal–Lucknow Express =

Train in India

Overview
- Service type: Express trains in India
- Locale: Madhya Pradesh, Uttar Pradesh
- Current operator(s): West Central Railway

Route
- Termini: Bhopal Junction; Lucknow Junction
- Distance travelled: 1,972 km (1,225 mi)
- Average journey time: 16 hours
- Service frequency: Weekly
- Train number(s): DN / ****UP

On-board services
- Class(es): AC 2 Tier, AC 3 Tier, Sleeper 3 Tier, Unreserved
- Seating arrangements: Yes
- Sleeping arrangements: Yes

Technical
- Operating speed: 55 km/h (34 mph) average with halts

The Bhopal–Lucknow Express is a Tri-Weekly superfast express train service offered by West Central Railways Bhopal Division. It runs between Bhopal Junction railway station of Bhopal the capital of Madhya Pradesh and Lucknow Junction railway station, the capital of Uttar Pradesh.

Bhopal–Lucknow Express , via Allahabad, is a newly announced weekly express train of the Indian Railways, which runs between Bhopal Junction railway station of Bhopal, the capital city of Central Indian state Madhya Pradesh and Lucknow, the capital city of North Indian state Uttar Pradesh.

The train is announced in the railway budget of 2011–12.

== Arrival and departure ==
One train depart from Bhopal every Mondays at 07:30 hrs. from platform 5 reaching Lucknow the next day at 05:40 hrs. One train will depart from Lucknow every Wednesday at 17:20, reaching Bhopal the next day at 18:30.

== Route and halts ==
The train will go via Allahabad (Prayagraj) & Bina–Katni Rail Route. The important halts of the train are :

- BHOPAL JUNCTION
- Vidisha
- Ganj Basoda
- Bina Junction
- Khurai
- Saugor
- Patharia
- Damoh
- Katni Junction
- Maihar
- Satna Junction
- Manikpur
- Prayagraj Junction
- Orai
- Kanpur Central
- Unnao Junction
- LUCKNOW

== Coach composite ==
The train will consist of 23 Coaches :

- 1 AC I Tier
- 2 AC II Tier
- 2 AC III Tier
- 10 Sleeper Coaches
- 5 Un Reserved
- 1 Ladies/Handy Capped
- 1 Luggage/Brake Van
- 1 Pantry Car

== Average speed and frequency ==
The train will run with an average speed of 53 km/h The train will run on Weekly basis.

== Other trains from Bhopal to Lucknow ==
- 12183/12184 Bhopal – Lucknow – Pratapgarh Express (Weekly)
- 12593/12594 Bhopal – Lucknow Garibrath Express

== Trivia ==
- The train goes via. Bina – Katni route
- The fifth train announced in between Bhopal and Lucknow point to point.

== See also ==
- Bhopal – Damoh Intercity Express
- Indore Junction
- Bhopal Junction
