= Vidisha railway station =

Railway station in Madhya Pradesh, India

Vidisha
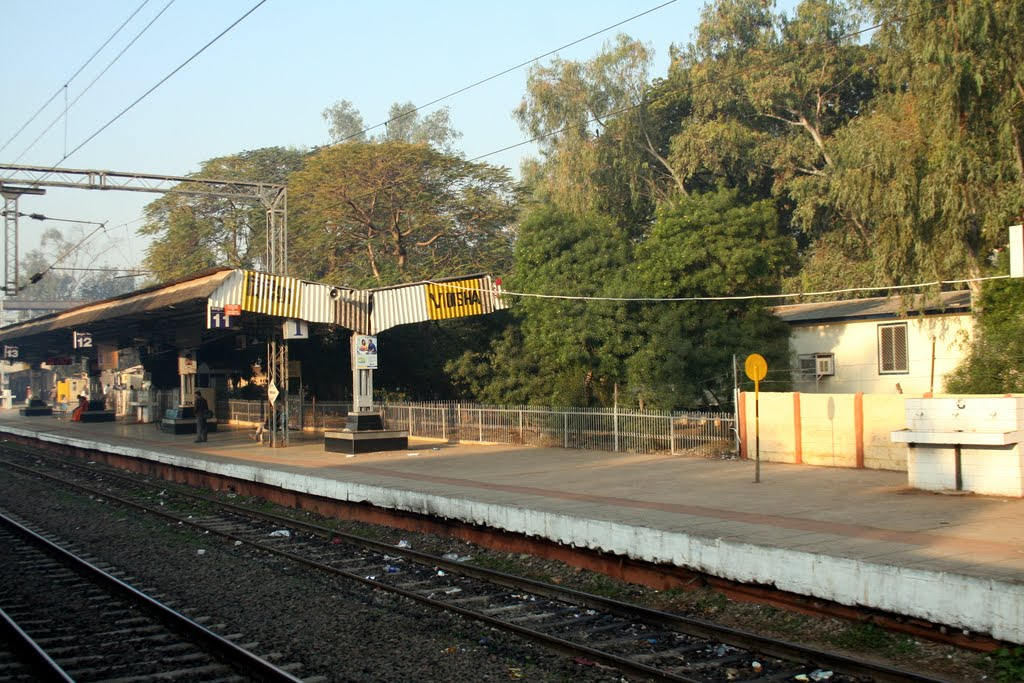
- View of platform No.1

General information
- Location: Vidisha, Vidisha district, Madhya Pradesh; India
- Coordinates: 23°31′21″N 77°48′54″E
- Elevation: 431 metres (1,414 ft)
- System: Indian Railways station
- Owner: Indian Railways
- Operator: West Central Railway
- Line: Agra–Bhopal section
- Platforms: 4
- Tracks: 4

Construction
- Structure type: Standard (on ground)
- Parking: Yes

Other information
- Status: Functioning
- Station code: BHS
- Zone(s): West Central Railway
- Division(s): Bhopal
Location
- Location within India Location within Madhya Pradesh

Vidisha railway station is a railway station in Vidisha district of Madhya Pradesh. Vidisha is a 'A' Category railway station of West Central Railway Zone of Indian Railways. It serves Vidisha city. Its code is BHS. The station consists of four platforms. Passenger, Express and Superfast trains halt here.

== Overview ==
Vidisha Railway Station is an important railway station located in Vidisha. It has 4 platforms and is situated at an altitude of 431 meters above sea level. Its code is BHS. It is part of the Bhopal railway division of West Central Railway. Many significant trains make a stop here.

=== Major trains ===
- Bandra Terminus–Gorakhpur Humsafar Express
- Bhopal–Damoh Rajya Rani Express
- Somnath–Jabalpur Express (via Bina)
- Jabalpur–H.Nizamuddin Express
- Rewanchal Express
- Kamayani Express
- Kshipra Express
- Bhopal–Bilaspur Express
- Vindhyachal Express
- Rewa–Dr. Ambedkar Nagar Express
- Howrah–Bhopal Weekly Express
- Bhopal–Singrauli Superfast Express
