= Damoh–Kota Passenger =

The Damoh–Kota Passenger is a daily passenger train service offered by West Central Railway. It runs between Damoh Junction railway station of Damoh City, Madhya Pradesh and Kota Junction Railway Station in Rajasthan, India.

== Arrival and departure ==
- Train 1736 starts from Damoh at 17:00 hrs, reaching Kota the next day at 02:00 hrs.
- Train 1735 departs from Kota Jn. at 04:00 hrs, reaching Damoh at 22:00 hrs.

== Route and stops ==
The train goes via. Bina–Katni rail route halting at almost all the major and minor stoppage. The major stops are:

- DAMOH
- Patharia
- Saugor Makronia
- Saugor
- Khurai
- Bina Junction (Madhya Pradesh)
- Ashoknagar
- Mungaoli
- Guna
- Ruthiyai
- KOTA JN.

== Coach composition ==
The train generally consist a total of 12 coaches including:

- 8 general coaches
- 3 sleeper coaches
- 1 chair car

It does not have a first-class compartment or pantry car.

== Average speed and frequency ==
The train runs with an average speed of 35 km/h.

== Trivia ==
- Locally, the train is known as Shuttle (or Suttle) by the people especially from rural areas.
- This is the first passenger train service on Bina–Katni rail route
- It is one of the oldest passenger train in India
- The number allotted for the train changed thrice. First it was 535/536 which changed than to 189/190 and is 1735/1736 at present.
- The train was first introduced between Damoh and Saugor in 1959 which was than introduced and extended till Kota Jn.
- The Kota bound passenger is always overcrowded as compared to Damoh bound passenger

== Other trains from Damoh to Kota/Jaipur ==
- Dayodaya Express
- Durg–Jaipur Express
