= Bina Junction railway station =

Railway junction in Madhya Pradesh

BINA JUNCTION

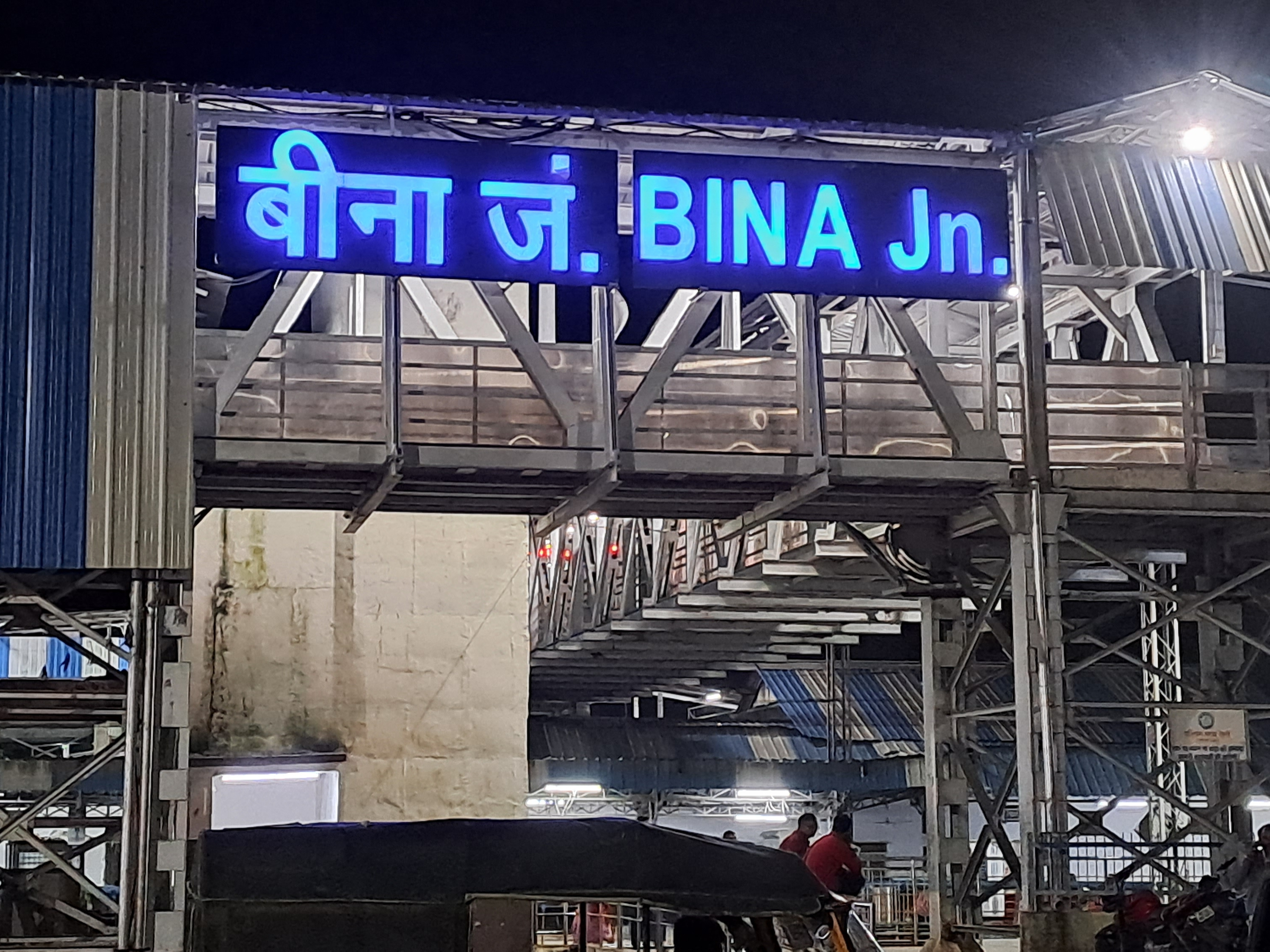
- Top:Bina junction railway station

General information
- Location: Bina, Sagar, Madhya Pradesh; India
- Coordinates: 24°10′16″N 78°11′07″E
- Elevation: 413 metres (1,355 ft)
- System: Indian Railways station
- Owner: Indian Railways
- Operator: West Central Railway
- Lines: New Delhi–Chennai main line, Agra–Bhopal section, Bina–Katni line, Bina–Guna–Baran line
- Platforms: 6
- Tracks: 6

Construction
- Structure type: Standard (on ground)
- Parking: Yes
- Cycle facilities: Yes

Other information
- Status: Functioning
- Station code: BINA
- Zone(s): West Central Railway
- Division(s): Bhopal

History
- Opened: 1889
- Electrified: 1989-90
Location
- Location within India Location within Madhya Pradesh

Bina Junction railway station is a railway station in the Indian state of Madhya Pradesh. It is part of the Bhopal division of West Central Railway. Bina Junction serves the city of Bina, along with Bundelkhand and Malwa. Bina Junction has six platforms.

== Line and route ==
There is four major root passing through Bina junction -

- Jhansi - Gwalior - Agra - Mathura - Delhi
- Vidisha - Bhopal - Itarsi - Betul - Nagpur
- Sagar - Katni - Shahdol - Bilaspur
- Ashoknagar - Guna - Baran - Kota

== History ==
During British Rule, Bina Junction was opened as Etawah Junction. At that time, the main line of the Agra to Bhopal Route was constructed. Bina station was constructed to transport bricks and rail rocks; in Malgadi, they are transported to an area near Jhansi, BhopalIi railway, and to railways in Goona and Ashoknagar.

The main station had been constructed by 1923 when the Katni to Bina line was built. An older railway station in Bina was abandoned between 1930 and 1935.

The name of Bina City and Bina station was changed to Bina and Etawah junction to Bina junction railway station by 1905, to avoid confusion with the city of Etawah in Uttar Pradesh.

== Connections ==
Bina junction is connected with many cities and station, including some direct trains. These include Bhopal, Virangana Lakshmibai jhansi, Jaipur, Hyderabad, Surat, Puri Madgaon, New Delhi, Amritsar, Jammutawi, Udhampur, Haridwar, Kanpur, Lucknow, Gaya, Banaras, Gorakhpur, Kota, Itarsi, Raipur, Ranchi, Dhanbad, Muri, Tatanagar, Kolkata, Patna, Mathura, Thane, Barauni, Guwahati, New Jalpaiguri, Darbhanga, Ballia, Nagpur, Pune, Mysore, Bangalore, Firozpur, Baroda, Bhuj, Rajkot, Okha, Gandhidham, Valsad, Kozhikode, Ernakulam, Somnath Gujarat, Mumbai, Panvel, Nasik, Chennai, Ajmer, Guna, Bhubaneswar, Sambalpur, Tirupati, Visakhapatnam, Vijayawada, Coimbatore, Tiruchirapalli, Jodhpur, Bilaspur, Nagda, Durg, Ujjain, Hapa, Udaipur, Ratlam, Gwalior, Agra, Katni, Jabalpur, Saugor, Gadarwara Rewa, Satna, Singrauli, and Indore. Direct trains to these cities include:

- Ahmedabad - Kolkata Express
- Ahmedabad - Patna Express
- Amritsar Express
- Andaman Express
- Ballia Express (via Khajuraho)
- Bandra Humsafar Express
- Bareilly Express
- Bhagat ki kothi-Tiruchirapalli Humsafar Express
- Bhuj Express
- Dakshin Express
- Dayodaya Express
- Darbhanga - Ahmedabad Clone Express
- Ernakulam Express
- Firozpur Express
- Grand Trunk Express
- Gondwana Express
- Gwalior Intercity Express
- Hyderabad Express
- Jhansi - Pune Express
- Jodhpur Express
- Karnataka Express
- Kushinagar Express
- Mahamana Express
- Malwa Express
- Mangla superfast express
- Bhopal Express
- Sachkhand Express
- Bhopal Pratapgarh Express
- Lucknow–Bhopal Garib Rath Express
- Kamayani Express
- Shipra Express
- Kamakhya-Dr.Ambedkar Nagar Express
- Punjab Mail
- Patna Express
- Firozpur Cantt. - Hazur Sahib Nanded Weekly Express
- Kongu Express
- Millennium Express
- Somnath – Jabalpur Express (via Bina)
- Mumbai superfast Express
- Okha Express (via Bina)
- Prayagraj - Dr.Ambedkar Nagar Express (via Khajuraho)
- Rewanchal Express
- Rewa-Indore IntercityExpress
- Samata Express
- Swarna jayanti Express
- Sabarmati Express
- Shatabdi Express
- Shridham Express
- Sultanpur Express
- Surat - Muzaffarpur Express
- Kerala Express
- Chhattisgarh Express
- Rajyarani Intercity Express
- Patalkot Express
- Pathankot Express
- Thiruvananthapuram Express
- Gwalior - SMVT Bengaluru Express

Virangana Laxmibai Jhansi introduced the 4th line, from Mathura to Bina, while Katni Introduced Bina Katni 3rd line . Bhopal introduced a 3rd line. Kota introduced Doubling with electri- fication via Guna to Bina. A new line is also proposed from Biyaora-Rajgarhto Bina.

== Facilities ==
Bina junction has upper, lower, and middle-class waiting rooms, toilets facilities, a ticket booth, potable water, and food trucks.
