= Madhya Pradesh Sampark Kranti Express =

Train in India

Overview
- Service type: Sampark Kranti Express
- Locale: Madhya Pradesh, Uttar Pradesh, Rajasthan, Haryana & Delhi
- First service: 11 March 2005; 21 years ago
- Current operator: West Central Railway

Route
- Termini: Jabalpur Junction (JBP); Hazrat Nizamuddin (NZM)
- Stops: 5
- Distance travelled: 905 km (562 mi)
- Average journey time: 12 hours 10 minutes
- Service frequency: Tri-weekly
- Train number: 12121 / 12122

On-board services
- Classes: AC 2 Tier; AC 3 Tier; Sleeper Class; General Unreserved
- Seating arrangements: Yes
- Sleeping arrangements: Yes
- Catering facilities: On-board catering, E-catering
- Observation facilities: Large windows
- Baggage facilities: Available
- Other facilities: Below the seats

Technical
- Rolling stock: LHB coach
- Track gauge: 1,676 mm (5 ft 6 in)
- Operating speed: 74 km/h (46 mph) average including halts.
Route map
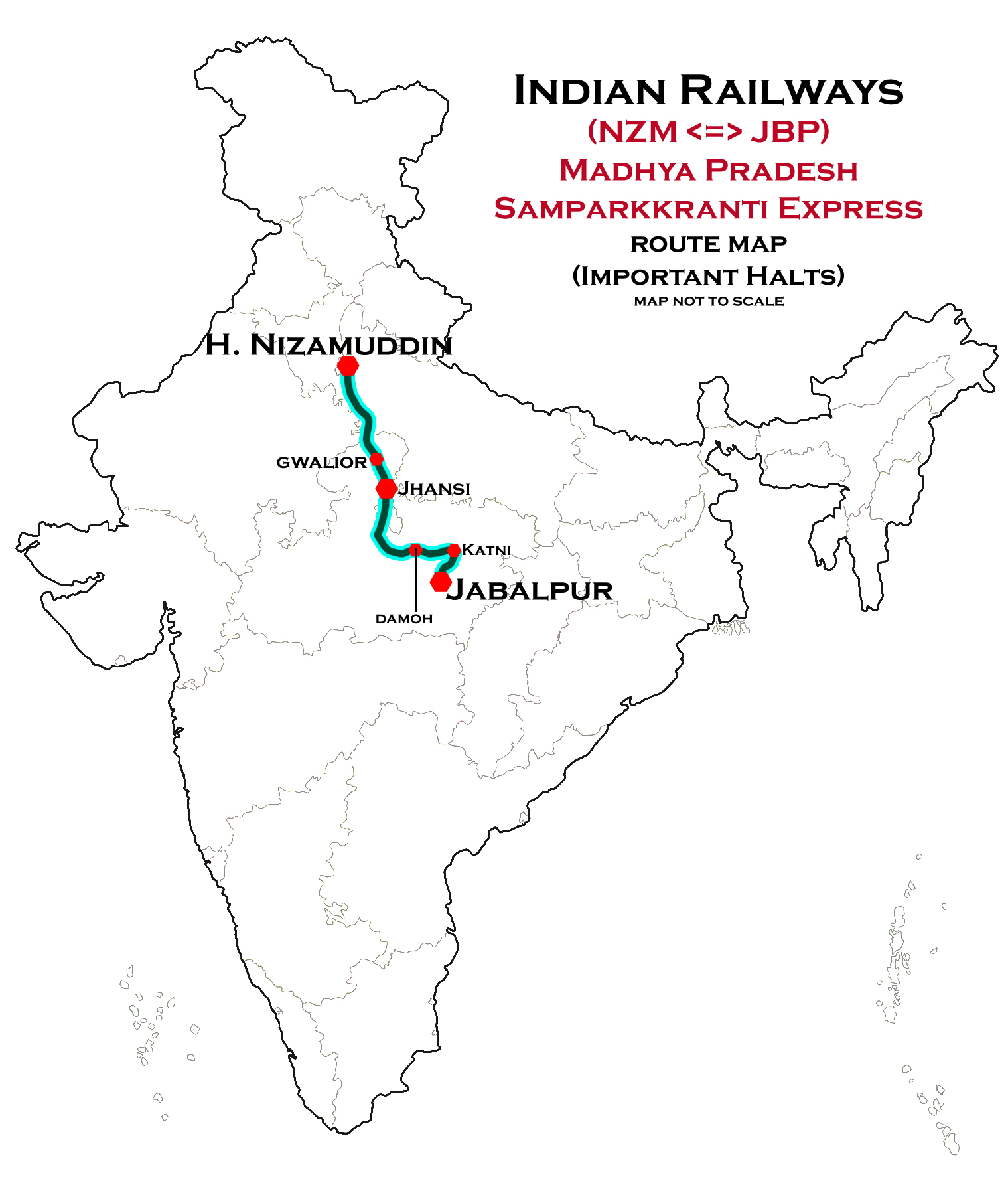

The 12121 / 12122 Madhya Pradesh Sampark Kranti Express is one of the trains among Sampark Kranti Express trains introduced in the 2005 Indian Railway Budget. The train runs between Jabalpur in Madhya Pradesh and Hazrat Nizamuddin in Delhi.

Madhya Pradesh Sampark Kranti Express, is organized by the West Central Railway (पश्चिम मध्य रेल) (IR code:-प.म.रे/WCR ) a unit of Indian Railways(भारतीय रेल) and owned by Jabalpur railway division. It is now changed from ICF to LHB coach.

== Times ==
Train no.	Destinations	Departure	Arrival	Frequency
12121	Jabalpur Junction–Hazrat Nizamuddin	19:10	07:50	S / W / F
12122	Hazrat Nizamuddin–Jabalpur Junction	17:55	07:50	M / T / S

== Route & halts ==
It runs from Jabalpur Junction via Katni Murwara Junction, Damoh, Saugor, Jhansi Junction, Gwalior Junction to Hazrat Nizamuddin.

== Traction ==
Both trains are hauled by an Itarsi Loco Shed-based WAP-7 electric locomotive from end to end.

== Coach info. ==
The train consists of total 22 coaches as follows:

- 1 AC-I Tier car
- 2 AC-II Tier cars
- 6 AC-III Tier cars
- 4 General coaches
- 7 Sleeper cars
- 1 Eog
- 1 Divyang Cum Luggage Cum Gard Coach

== Average speed ==
The train runs with an average speed of 75 km/h.

== Alternative trains for Jabalpur and New Delhi ==
- Mahakoshal Express by West Central Railway
- Gondwana Express by Northern Railways
- Jammu Tawi–Jabalpur Express a weekly by West Central Railways
- Jabalpur–H.Nizamuddin Express via Itarsi on a daily basis.

== See also ==
- Habibganj–New Delhi Shatabdi Express
- Shaan-e-Bhopal Express
- Taj Express
- Avantika Express
- Malwa Express
- Sampark Kranti Express
