= Bandakpur railway station =

Railway station in Madhya Pradesh, India

Bandakpur

General information
- Location: Bandakpur, Damoh district, Madhya Pradesh; India
- Coordinates: 23°50′53″N 79°34′32″E
- System: Indian Railways station
- Owner: Indian Railways
- Operator: West Central Railway
- Line: Bina–Katni line
- Platforms: 2
- Tracks: 2

Construction
- Structure type: Standard (on ground)
- Parking: Yes

Other information
- Status: Functioning
- Station code: BNU
- Zone(s): West Central Railway
- Division(s): Jabalpur
Location
- Location within India Location within Madhya Pradesh

Bandakpur railway station is a railway station in Bandakpur town of Madhya Pradesh. Its code is BNU. It serves Bandakpur town. The station consists of two platforms. Passenger, Express and Superfast trains halt here.
