= Bhopal–Pratapgarh Express (via Lucknow) =

Train in India

The Bhopal – Lucknow / Pratapgarh Express is a weekly superfast train which runs between Bhopal Junction railway station of Bhopal, the capital city of Madhya Pradesh and Lucknow, the capital city of Uttar Pradesh and then to a neighbouring town called Pratapgarh.

== Number and nomenclature ==
The train number is :

- 12183 – From Bhopal Junction to Pratapgarh Junction
- 12184 – From Pratapgarh Junction to Bhopal Junction

== Arrival and departure ==
Train no.12183 departs from Bhopal Junction every Sunday, Tuesday, Friday at 19:20 hrs., reaching Pratapgarh Junction at 09:05 hrs. the next day. Train no.12184 departs from Pratapgarh Junction every Monday, Wednesday, Saturday at 19:10 hrs., reaching Bhopal Junction the next day at 08:50 hrs.

== Route and halts ==
The train goes via Bina – Jhansi – Kanpur rail route. The important halts of the train are :

- BHOPAL JUNCTION
- Vidisha
- Bina Junction
- Lalitpur
- Jhansi Junction
- Orai
- Kanpur Central
- LUCKNOW
- Rae Bareli Junction
- Amethi
- Pratapgarh Junction

== Coach composite ==
The train normally consist a total of 21 Coaches which are :

The train does not have any pantry car.

== Average speed and frequency ==
The train has an average speed of 68 km/hour from both the sites.

== Other trains from Bhopal to Lucknow ==
- 12183/12184 – Bhopal – Lucknow Express (tri weekly)
- 12529/12530 – Bhopal – Lucknow Garibrath Express
