= Sihora Road railway station =

Railway station in Madhya Pradesh, India

Sihora Road

General information
- Location: Sihora, Jabalpur district, Madhya Pradesh; India
- Coordinates: 23°28′01″N 80°06′35″E
- Elevation: 388 metres (1,273 ft)
- System: Indian Railways station
- Owner: Indian Railways
- Operator: West Central Railway
- Line: Allahabad–Jabalpur section
- Platforms: 2
- Tracks: 2

Construction
- Structure type: Standard (on ground)
- Parking: Yes

Other information
- Status: Functioning
- Station code: SHR
- Zone(s): West Central Railway
- Division(s): Jabalpur
Location
- Location within India Location within Madhya Pradesh

Sihora Road railway station is a railway station near Sihora town of Madhya Pradesh. Its code is SHR. It serves Sihora town. The station consists of two platforms. Passenger, Express and Superfast trains halt here.
