= Nishatpura railway station =

Railway station in Madhya Pradesh

Nishatpura

General information
- Location: Bhopal, Madhya Pradesh; India
- Coordinates: 23.2878°N 77.4254°E
- System: Express, Suburban train and Passenger train station
- Owner: Indian Railways
- Operator: West Central Railway

Construction
- Structure type: Standard (on-ground station)

Other information
- Status: Functioning
- Station code: NSZ
- Zone(s): West Central Railway
- Division(s): Bhopal

Services
Preceding station	Indian Railways	Following station
Bhopal Junction towards ?	West Central Railway zone Agra-Bhopal section	Sukhi Sewaniya towards ?
Location
- Interactive map

Nishatpura railway station (station code: NSZ) is a terminal railway station of Bhopal City, the capital of Madhya Pradesh. It also has a goods train yard, siding, and fueling depot for diesel engines. It is operated by West Central Railway. It is famous for the coach repair workshop of the Indian railways.

== Development ==
The railways decided to redevelop Nishatpura into a fully-functional railway station, to decrease the load on the Bhopal Junction railway station as the trains coming from Bina and going towards Indore have to undergo loco-reversal at Bhopal Junction. The development of Nishatpura would save the time and logistics both.
