= Durgavati Express =

Express train in India

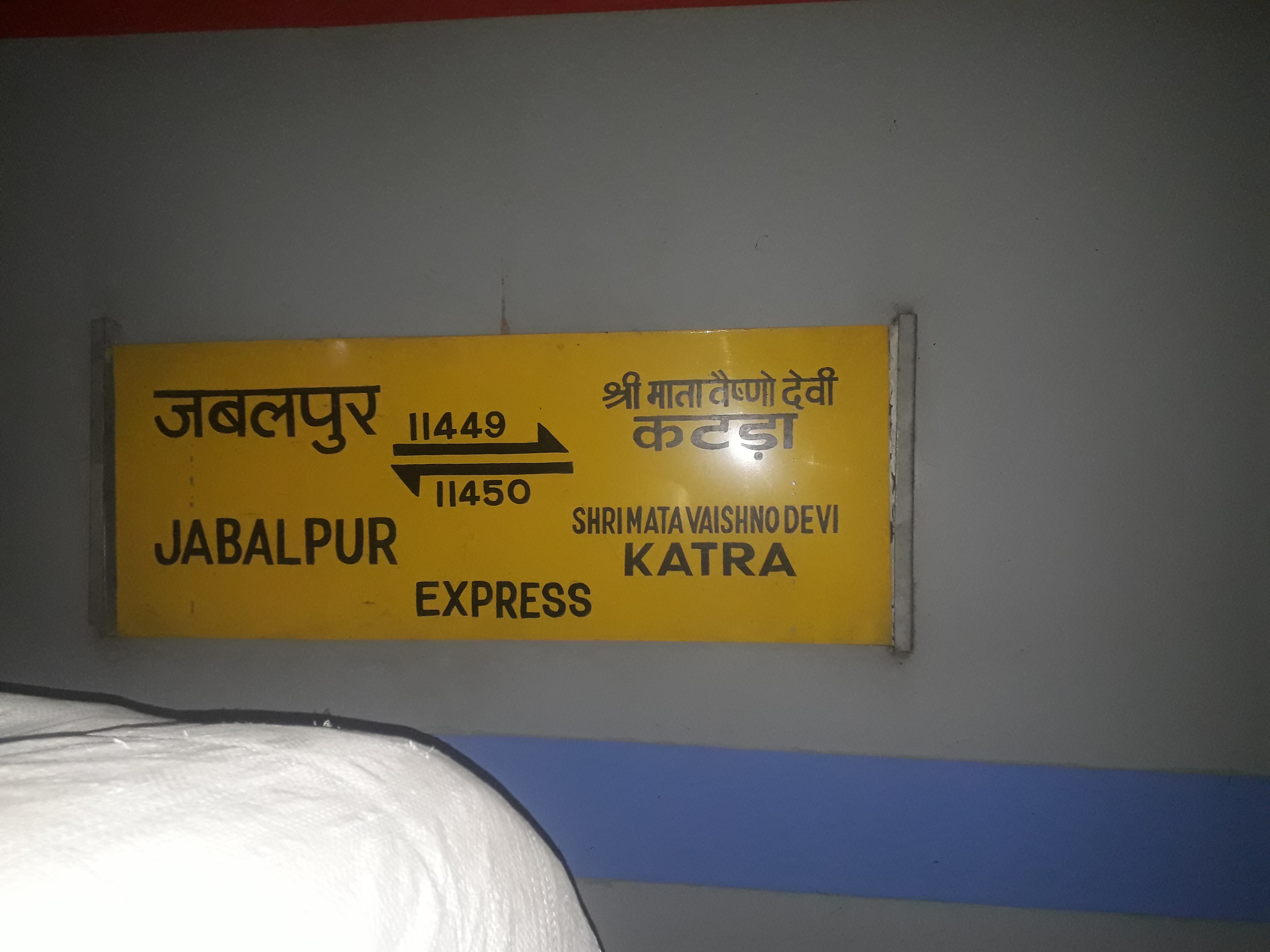

Overview
- Service type: Express
- First service: 1 September 2015; 10 years ago(extended to Shri Mata Vaishno Devi Katra)
- Current operator: West Central Railways

Route
- Termini: Jabalpur Junction (JBP); Shri Mata Vaishno Devi Katra (SVDK)
- Stops: 31
- Distance travelled: 1,583 km (984 mi)
- Average journey time: 32 hours
- Service frequency: Weekly
- Train number: 11449 / 11450

On-board services
- Classes: AC 2 Tier (2A), AC 3 Tier (3A), Sleeper class (SL)
- Seating arrangements: No
- Sleeping arrangements: Yes
- Catering facilities: Available
- Observation facilities: Rake sharing with 12193/ 12194 Yesvantpur–Jabalpur Superfast Express

Technical
- Rolling stock: ICF coach
- Track gauge: 1,676 mm (5 ft 6 in)
- Operating speed: 51 km/h (32 mph) average including halts
Route map
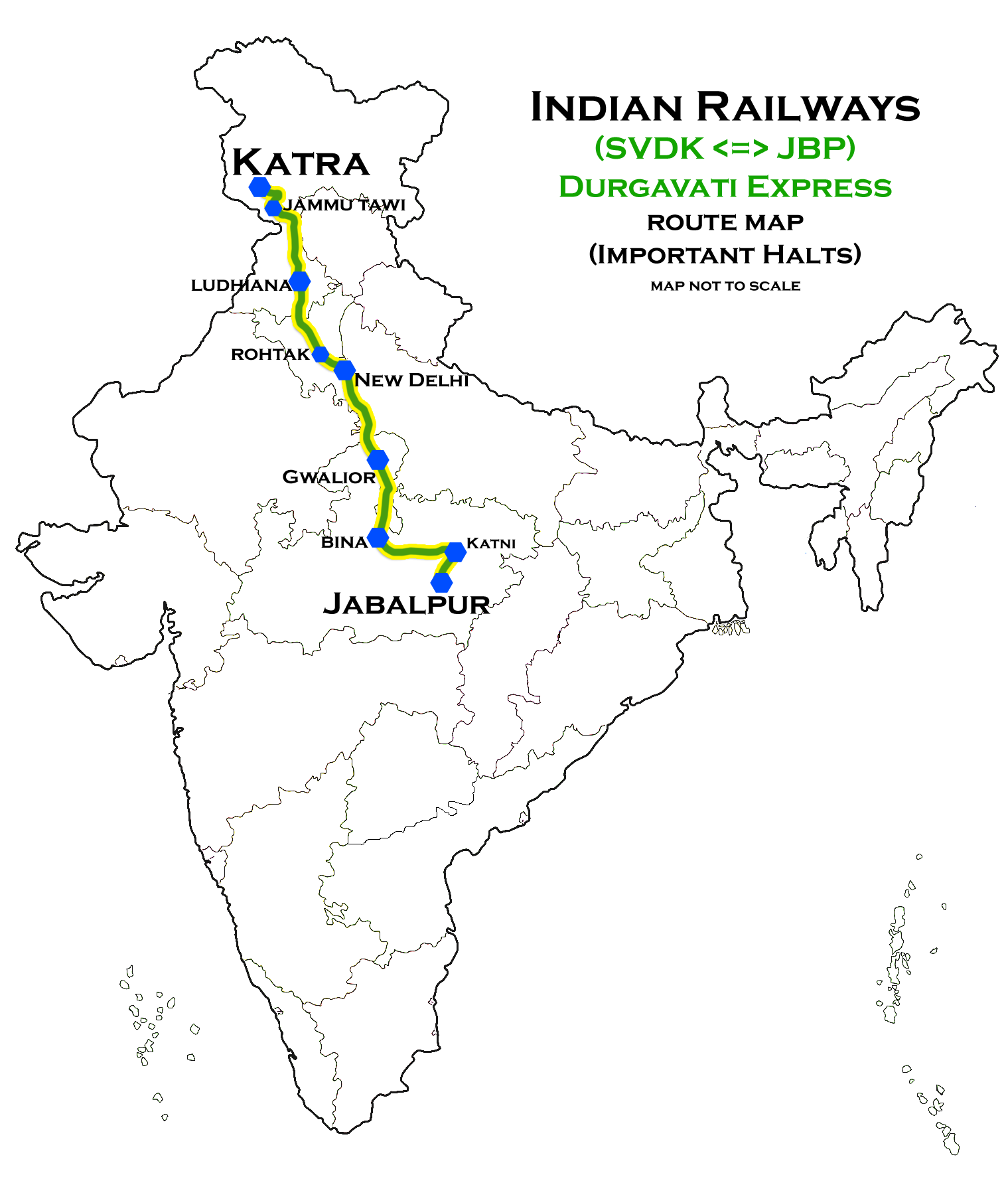

The Durgavati Express is a weekly Express train service run by West Central Railway, It runs between Jabalpur Junction railway station of Jabalpur, a military hub of Eastern Madhya Pradesh state and Katra railway station of Jammu & Kashmir in India.

It operates as train number 11449 from Jabalpur Junction to Shri Mata Vaishno Devi Katra and as train number 11450 in the reverse direction, serving the states of Madhya Pradesh, Uttar Pradesh, Haryana, Delhi, Punjab and Jammu and Kashmir.

== Background ==
The name Durgavati Express was given in the memory of the princess of the Mahakoshal region in Jabalpur named Princess Durgavati (Rani Durgavati).

== Coach composition ==
The train consists of 23 coaches: 2 AC II tier, four AC III tier, 10 sleeper, three Unreserved Coaches, and 2 luggage/brake vans. It carries a pantry car.

== Routing ==
This train runs from Jabalpur Junction via Katni Junction, Bina Junction, Jhansi Junction, Gwalior Junction, Agra Cantonment, New Delhi, Rohtak Junction, Ludhiana Junction, Pathankot Cantonment, Jammu Tawi to Shri Mata Vaishno Devi Katra.

== Traction ==
As large sections of the route are yet to be fully electrified, a Katni Junction-based WDM-3A diesel locomotive powers the train up to Katni Junction, then a Katni Junction-based WAG-5 powers the train up to New Delhi, later a Tughlakabad-based WDP-4B diesel locomotive powers the train to its destination.

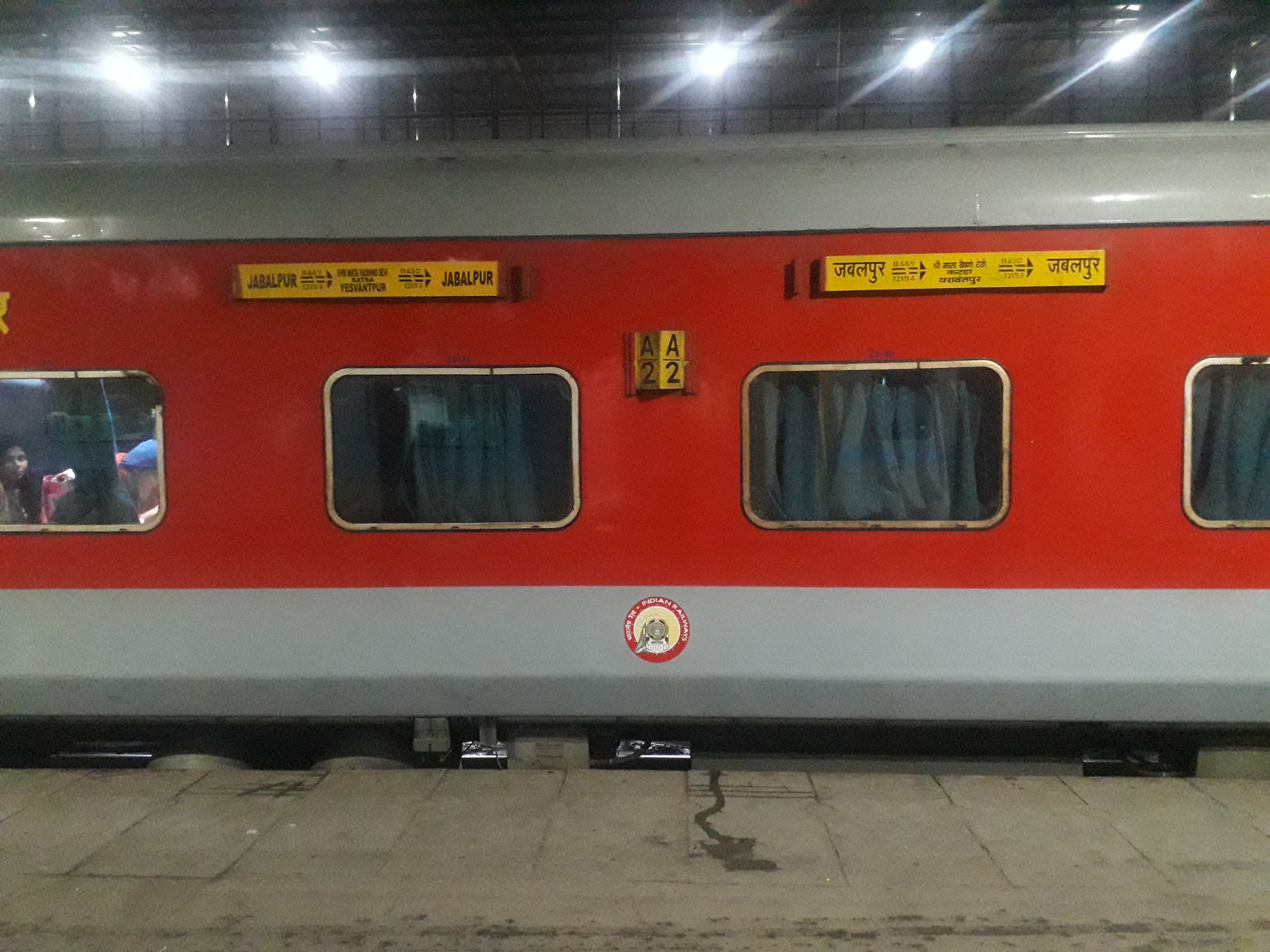
Durgavati Express – AC 2 tier
