= Makronia =

- city
- Location in Madhya Pradesh, India Makronia (India)
- Coordinates: 23°51′23″N 78°47′4″E
- Country: India
- State: Madhya Pradesh
- District: Sagar

Population (2011)
  - Total: 23,861

Languages
  - Official: Hindi
- Time zone: UTC+5:30 (IST)
- ISO 3166 code: IN-MP
- Vehicle registration: MP

Makronia is a municipality in Sagar district in the Indian state of Madhya Pradesh. Its part of Sagar Urban Agglomeration.

== Description ==
The Dr H. S. Gour University started from Makronia's SAF Campus so many historic events are connected through Makronia. This region is developing as the suburban region near Sagar City. It is just 5 km away from the city. It has its separate railway station, the biggest hotel in Sagar, the Paradise Hotel. Many CBSE and MP board schools, as well as a government engineering college are here. Indian army bases is located in Makronia. Also Makronia Nagar Palika, there are many Engineering Colleges in Makronia. Since there is a shortage of space in the City, development is moving towards the Makronia Region.

== Geography ==
Makroniya is located at 23.85°N 78.79°E. It has an average elevation of 508 metres (1669 feet).

== Demographics ==
As of 2011 India census, Makronia had a population of 23,861. Males constitute 52% of the population and females 48%. Makronia has an average literacy rate of 87.75%, higher than the national average of 74.4%: male literacy is 92.65%, and female literacy is 82.41%. In Makronia, 11.86% of the population is under 6 years of age.

== Transportation ==
Makroniya is well connected with roadways and railway.

Makronia railway station is located in the city. Its code is MKRN. It serves Makronia town. It's connected it from major cities.

== See also ==
- Sagar District
