= Kareli railway station =

Railway station in Madhya Pradesh, India

Kareli

General information
- Location: Kareli, Narsinghpur district, Madhya Pradesh; India
- Coordinates: 22°55′56″N 79°04′00″E
- Elevation: 365 metres (1,198 ft)
- System: Indian Railways station
- Owner: Indian Railways
- Operator: West Central Railway
- Line: Jabalpur–Bhusaval section
- Platforms: 2
- Tracks: 2

Construction
- Structure type: Standard (on ground)
- Parking: Yes

Other information
- Status: Functioning
- Station code: KY
- Zone(s): West Central Railway
- Division(s): Jabalpur
Location
- Location within India Location within Madhya Pradesh

Kareli railway station is a railway station in Kareli city of Madhya Pradesh. Its code is KY. It serves Kareli city. The station consists of two platforms. Passenger, Express and Superfast trains halt here.
