= Narayawali =

Narayawali is a town near Khurai City and Sagar on main Bina–Katni rail route. It is located in Sagar district of Madhya Pradesh, India.

It is a town located between two hills and at center there is a lake.

The town has an old fort, locally known as "gadi(गढ़ी)".
