= Shipra Express =

Train in India

Shipra Superfast Express

Overview
- Service type: Superfast Express
- Locale: Madhya Pradesh, Uttar Pradesh, Bihar, Jharkhand & West Bengal
- First service: 18 August 1988; 38 years ago
- Current operator: Western Railway

Route
- Termini: Indore (INDB); Howrah (HWH)
- Stops: 35
- Distance travelled: 1,738 km (1,080 mi)
- Average journey time: 30 hours 40 minutes
- Service frequency: Tri-weekly
- Train number: 22911 / 22912

On-board services
- Classes: AC First Class, AC 2 Tier, AC 3 Tier, Sleeper Class, General Unreserved
- Seating arrangements: Yes
- Sleeping arrangements: Yes
- Catering facilities: Available
- Observation facilities: Large windows
- Baggage facilities: Available
- Other facilities: Below the seats

Technical
- Rolling stock: LHB coach
- Track gauge: 1,676 mm (5 ft 6 in)
- Operating speed: 130 km/h (81 mph) maximum speed, 57 km/h (35 mph) average with halts
Route map
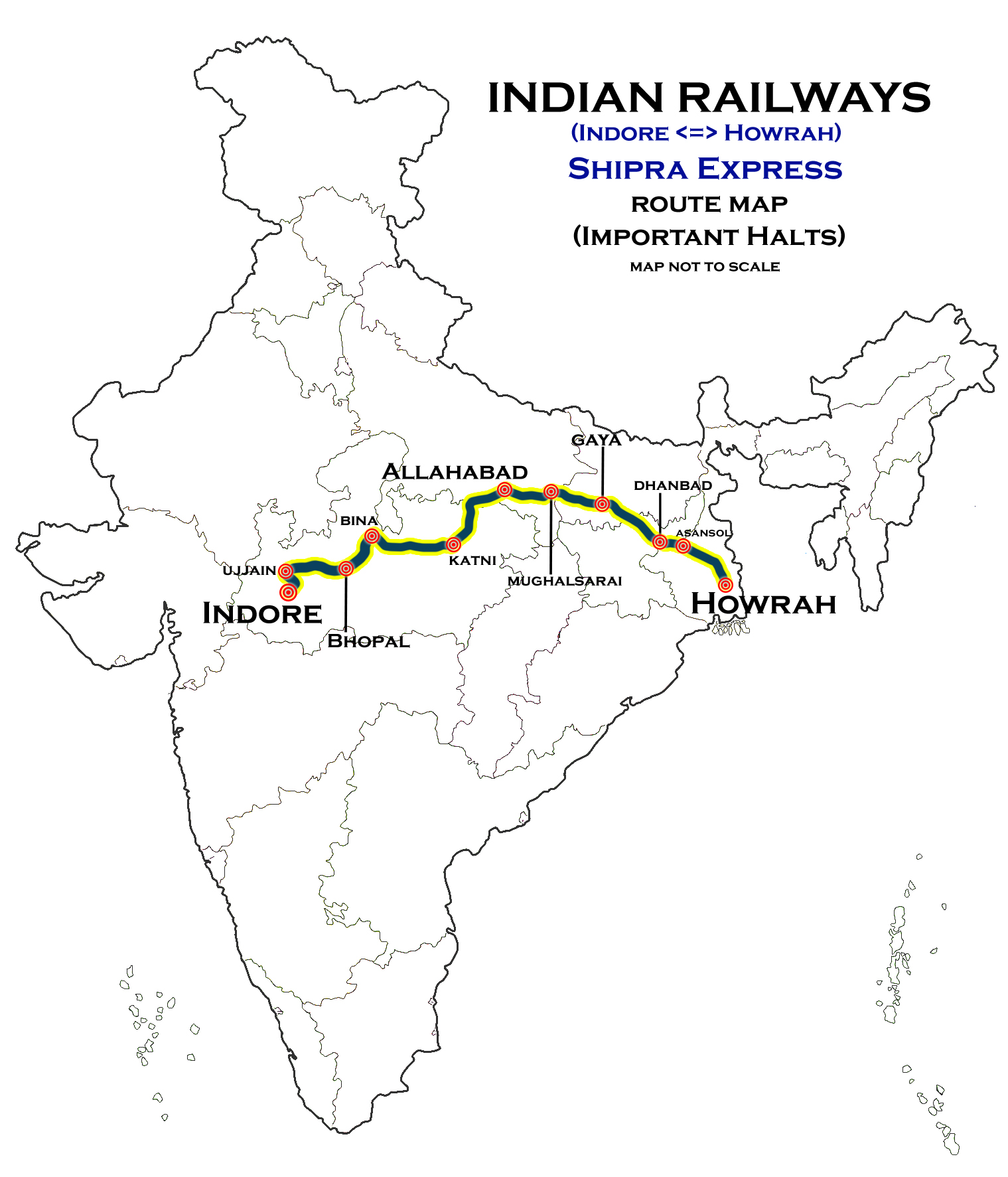

The Shipra Superfast Express is superfast express train of Indian Railways, which runs between Indore Junction of Indore, the largest city & commercial hub of Central Indian state Madhya Pradesh and Howrah, the commercial hub of Kolkata. The name 'Kshipra' signifies the Shipra River, one of the holiest river near Ujjain city.

== Coach composition ==
The train consists of 22 LHB coach;

- AC II Tier: 1
- EOG cum Luggage Rake: 2
- AC III Tier: 4
- General Unreserved: 4
- Sleeper class: 11

== Service ==
The 22911/Shipra Express has an average speed of 56 km/h and covers 1738 km in 31 hrs 20 mins.

The 22912/Shipra Express has an average speed of 55 km/h and covers 1738 km in 31 hrs 50 mins.

== Route and halts ==
The important halts of the train are;

- Indore Junction
- Dewas Junction
- Ujjain Junction
- Shujalpur
- Sant Hirdaram Nagar
- Vidisha
- Bina Junction
- Saugor
- Damoh
- Katni Murwara Junction
- Maihar
- Satna Junction
- Manikpur Junction
- Shankargarh
- Prayagraj Chheoki Junction
- Vindhyachal
- Mirzapur
- Chunar Junction
- Pt. DD Upadhyaya Junction
- Sasaram Junction
- Dehri-on-Sone
- Anugraha Narayan Road
- Gaya Junction
- Koderma Junction
- Parasnath
- NSC Bose Gomoh
- Dhanbad Junction
- Asansol Junction
- Durgapur Junction
- Barddhaman Junction
- Howrah Junction.

== Schedule ==
Train number	Station code	Departure station	Departure time	Departure day	Arrival station	Arrival time	Arrival day
22911	INDB	Indore Junction	23:30 PM	Tue, Thu, Sat	Howrah Junction	06:50 AM	Mon, Thu, Sat
22912	HWH	Howrah Junction	17:45 PM	Mon, Thu, Sat	Indore Junction	01:35 AM	Mon, Wed, Sat

== Rake sharing ==
The train shares its rake with 19313/19314 & 19321/19322 Indore–Patna Express.

== Direction reversal ==
The train reverses its direction once at;

- Ujjain Junction.

== Traction ==
Both trains are hauled by a Vadodara Loco Shed-based WAP-5 or WAP-7 electric locomotive from Indore Junction to Howrah Junction and vice versa.

== See also ==
- Avantika Express
