= Niwar =

Niwar Pahadi Niwar
- Town
- Location in Madhya Pradesh, India
- Coordinates: 24°N 80.40°E
- Country: India
- State: Madhya Pradesh
- District: Katni

Government
  - Type: Elected
  - Body: Gram Panchayat
- Elevation: 387 m (1,270 ft)

Population (2011)
  - Total: 12,456

Languages
  - Official: Hindi
- Time zone: UTC+5:30 (IST)
- PIN: 483442
- Telephone code: 07622
- Vehicle registration: MP-21
- Website: katni.nic.in

Niwar, also known as Pahadi, is a town on the banks of the Niwar River in Katni District in Madhya Pradesh, India. It is the administrative headquarters of Katni District. It is located in the Mahakoshal Region of Central India.
