= Patharia railway station =

Railway station in Madhya Pradesh, India

Patharia

General information
- Location: Patharia, Damoh district, Madhya Pradesh; India
- Coordinates: 23°54′21″N 79°11′33″E
- Elevation: 384 metres (1,260 ft)
- System: Indian Railways station
- Owner: Indian Railways
- Operator: West Central Railway
- Line: Bina–Katni line
- Platforms: 2
- Tracks: 2

Construction
- Structure type: Standard (on ground)
- Parking: Yes

Other information
- Status: Functioning
- Station code: PHA
- Zone(s): West Central Railway
- Division(s): Jabalpur
Location
- Location within India Location within Madhya Pradesh

Patharia railway station is a railway station in Patharia town of Madhya Pradesh. Its code is PHA. It serves Patharia town. The station consists of two platforms. Passenger, Express and Superfast trains halt here.
