= Aslana =

Railway station in Madhya Pradesh, India

Coordinates: 23°56′N 79°19′E

Aslana is a town located in Damoh district in Madhya Pradesh, India. It has a railway station on the Bina Katni Rail Line.
