= Kota, Uttar Pradesh =

Kota
- Nickname: Samajwadi
- Location in Uttar Pradesh, India Kota (India)
- Coordinates: 24.45°N 83.13°E
- Country: India
- State: Uttar Pradesh
- District: Sonbhadra
- Elevation: 174 m (571 ft)

Population (2001)
  - Total: 13,544

Languages
  - Official: Hindi
- Time zone: UTC+5:30 (IST)
- Vehicle registration: UP
- Website: up.gov.in

Kota is a census town in Sonbhadra district in the Indian state of Uttar Pradesh.

== Demographics ==
As of the 2001 Census of India, Kota had a population of 13,544. Males constitute 53% of the population and females 47%. Kota has an average literacy rate of 82%, higher than the national average of 59.5%: male literacy is 88%, and female literacy is 75%. In Kota, 11% of the population is under 6 years of age.
