= Lucknow–Bhopal Garib Rath Express =

Train in India

Lucknow – Bhopal Garib Rath Express
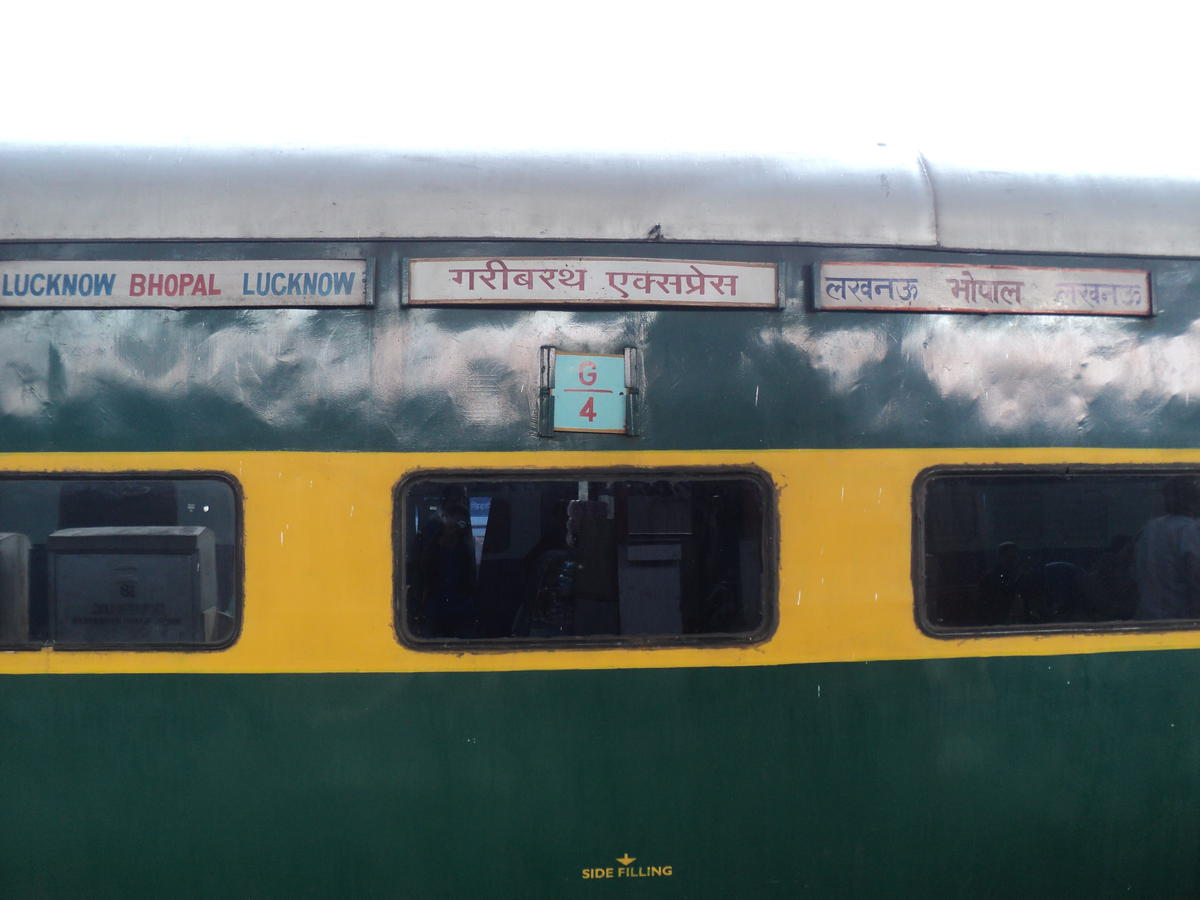
- Destination Board of Lucknow Jn. – Bhopal Garib Rath Express

Overview
- Service type: Garib Rath Express
- Locale: Uttar Pradesh & Madhya Pradesh
- First service: 19 November 2011; 14 years ago
- Current operator: North Eastern Railway

Route
- Termini: Lucknow Junction; Bhopal Junction
- Stops: Vidisha, Bina Junction, Jhansi Junction, Kanpur Central
- Distance travelled: 585 km (364 mi)
- Average journey time: 10 hours 50 minutes
- Service frequency: Weekly
- Train number: 12593 / 12594

On-board services
- Class: AC 3 Tier
- Seating arrangements: Yes
- Sleeping arrangements: Yes
- Catering facilities: On-board Catering; E-Catering

Technical
- Rolling stock: Standard Indian Railways Garib Rath Coaches
- Track gauge: broad gauge
- Operating speed: 63 km/h (39 mph) average with halts

The Bhopal-Lucknow Garib Rath Express is a Garib Rath Express train that is run by Indian Railways. It helps people travel between the cities of Bhopal and Lucknow in the states of Madhya Pradesh and Uttar Pradesh.

== Route and halts ==
The train will go via Bina – Jhansi Rail Route. The important halts of the train are :

- Bhopal Junction
- Vidisha
- Bina Junction
- Jhansi Junction
- Kanpur Central
- Lucknow JN

== Coach composite ==
The train consists of 12 Coaches :

- 10 AC III Tier
- 2 Luggage/Generator Van/Power Car

== Average speed and frequency ==
The train runs with an average speed of 63 km/h The train runs on a Weekly basis.

== Other trains from Bhopal to Lucknow ==
- 12183/12184 Bhopal – Lucknow – Pratapgarh Express (Weekly)

== Trivia ==
- The train goes via. Bina – Jhansi route
- The sixth train announced in between Bhopal and Lucknow point to point.

== Rake Sharing ==
The train shares its rake with Lucknow Raipur Garib Rath Express

== Traction ==
As the route is fully electrified, a GD based WAP-7 or a GKP based WAP-4 locomotive powers the train.

== See also ==
- Bhopal – Damoh Intercity Express
- Indore Junction
- Bhopal Junction
