= Makronia railway station =

Railway station in Madhya Pradesh

Makronia

General information
- Location: Makronia, Sagar district, Madhya Pradesh; India
- Coordinates: 23°52′00″N 78°48′33″E
- Elevation: 527 metres (1,729 ft)
- System: Indian Railways station
- Owner: Indian Railways
- Operator: West Central Railway
- Line: Bina–Katni line
- Platforms: 2
- Tracks: 2

Construction
- Structure type: Standard (on ground)
- Parking: Yes

Other information
- Status: Functioning
- Station code: MKRN
- Zone(s): West Central Railway
- Division(s): Jabalpur
Location
- Location within India Location within Madhya Pradesh

Makronia railway station is a railway station in Makronia town of Madhya Pradesh. Its code is MKRN. It serves Makronia town. Makronia is a 'D' Category railway station of West Central Railway Zone of Indian Railways. The station consists of 2 platforms. Passenger, Express and Superfast trains halt here.

== See also ==
- Saugor railway station
- Khurai railway station
