= Gondwana Express =

The Jabalpur–Hazrat Nizamuddin Gondwana Express is a Superfast Express train of West Central Railway in India. It runs between Jabalpur Junction and Hazrat Nizamuddin daily.

Following is a detailed Gondwana Express train schedule

No.	Station
1	Jabalpur (JBP)
2	Sihora Road (SHR)
3	Katni (KTE)
4	Bandakpur (BNU)
5	Damoh (DMO)
6	Patharia (PHA)
7	Saugor (SGO)
8	Khurai (KYE)
9	Bina Jn (BINA)
10	Lalitpur (LAR)
11	Jhansi Jn (JHS)
12	Gwalior (GWL)
13	Agra Cantt (AGC)
14	Mathura Jn (MTJ)
15	H Nizamuddin (NZM)
