= Bandakpur =

- Town
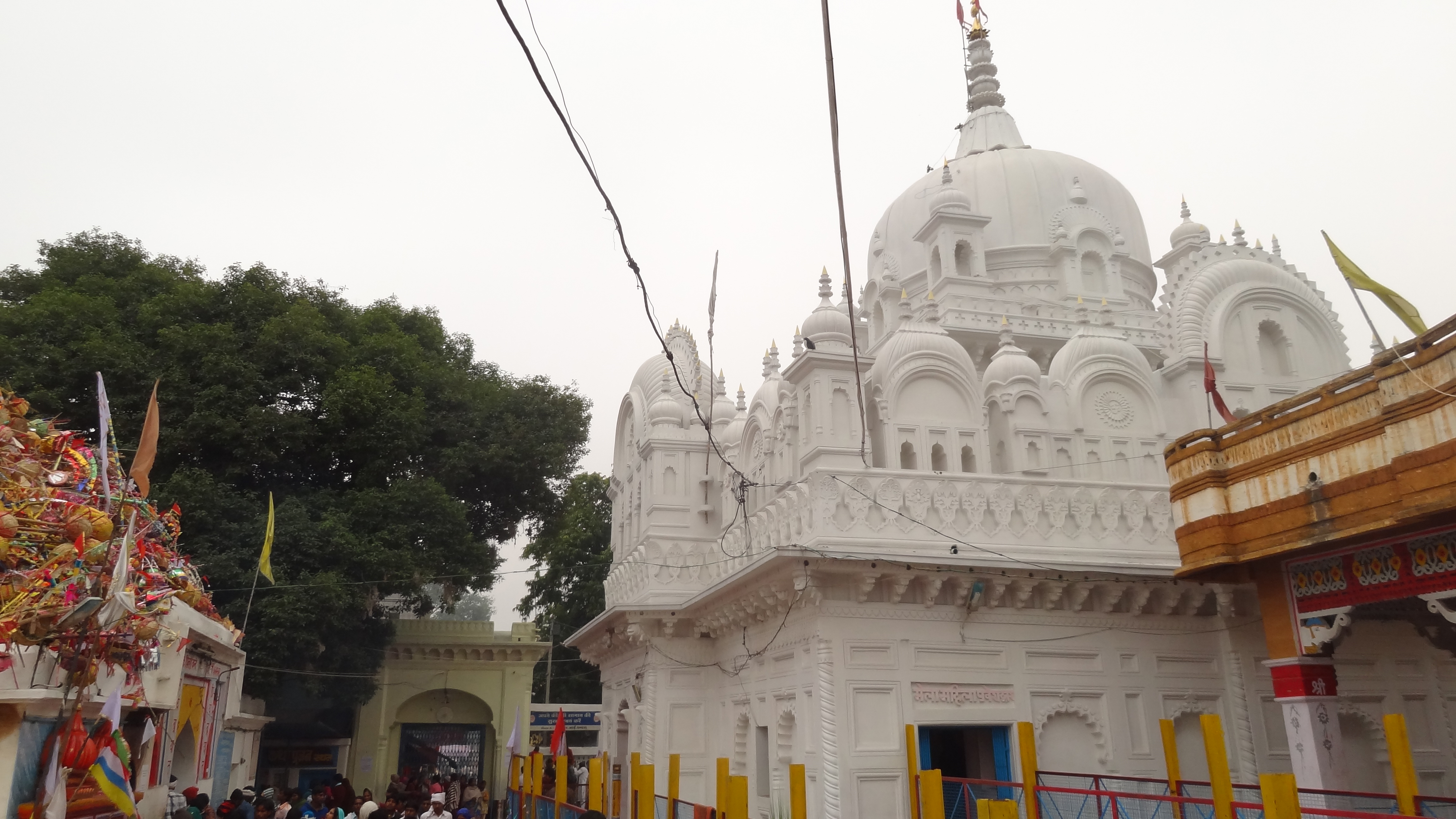

- Location in Madhya Pradesh, India. Bandakpur (India)
- Coordinates: 23°50′53″N 79°34′32″E
- Country: India
- State: Madhya Pradesh
- District: Damoh

Bandakpur is a small town in the district of Damoh in Madhya Pradesh, India.
