= Dayodaya Express =

Train in India

Overview
- Service type: Superfast Express
- First service: 1 April 2003; 23 years ago
- Current operator: West Central Railway

Route
- Termini: Jabalpur Junction (JBP); Ajmer Junction (AII)
- Stops: 23
- Distance travelled: 1,028 km (639 mi)
- Average journey time: 17 hours 05 minutes
- Service frequency: Daily
- Train number: 12181 / 12182

On-board services
- Classes: AC First Class, AC 2 Tier, AC 3 Tier, Sleeper Class, General Unreserved
- Seating arrangements: Yes
- Sleeping arrangements: Yes
- Catering facilities: On-board catering, E-catering
- Observation facilities: Large windows
- Baggage facilities: Available
- Other facilities: Below the seats

Technical
- Rolling stock: LHB coach
- Track gauge: 1,676 mm (5 ft 6 in)
- Operating speed: 60 km/h (37 mph) average including halts.
Route map
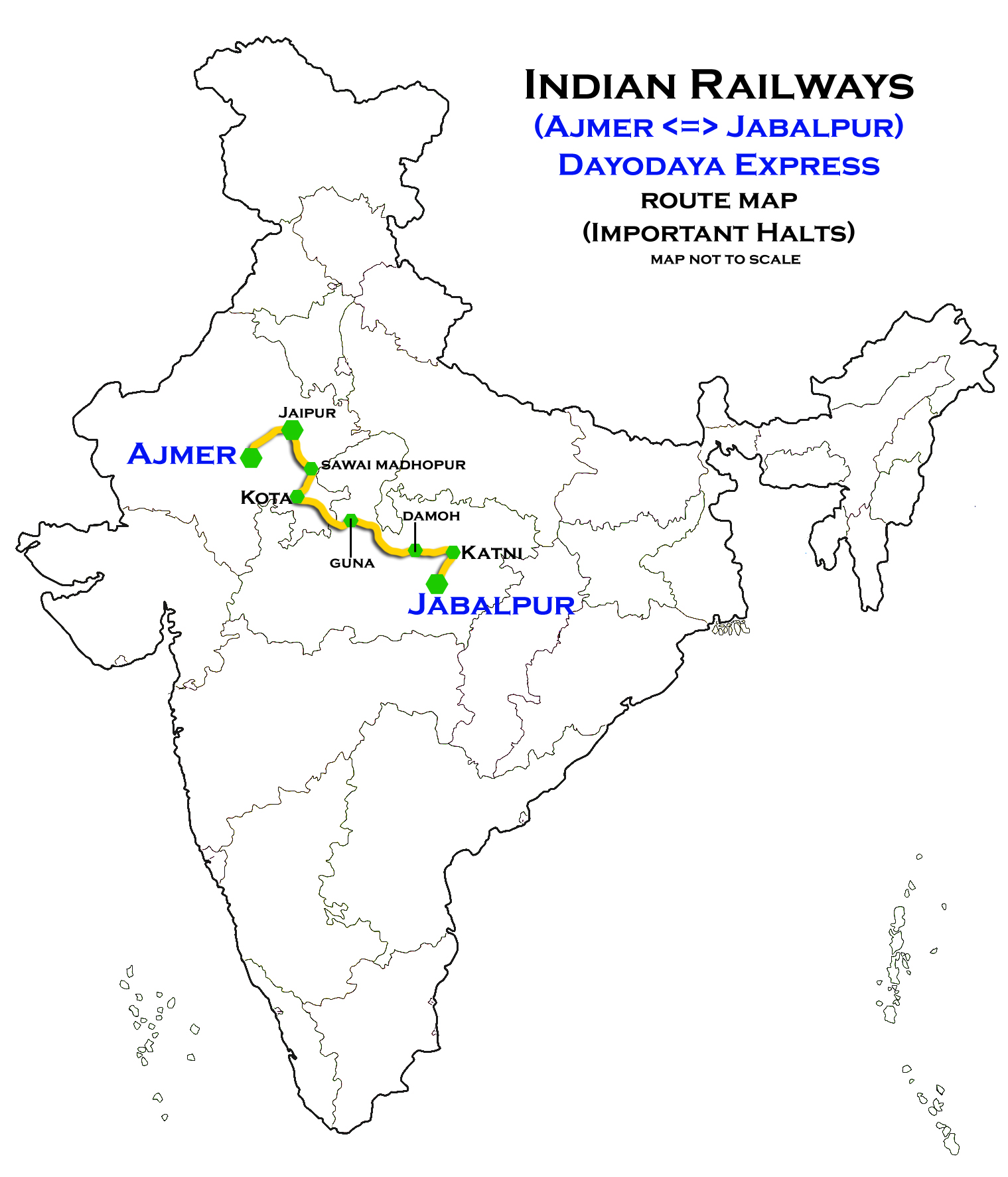

The 12181 / 12182 Dayodaya Express is a superfast express train service running between Jabalpur Junction of Jabalpur in Eastern Madhya Pradesh and Ajmer Junction of Rajasthan. The Train initially ran between Jabalpur and Jaipur, later it was extended to Ajmer. It was named 'Dayodaya' on Shri Dayodaya Tirth in Jabalpur.

== Service ==
- 12181 Dayodaya Express covers total journey of 1021 kilometers. At 21:00 it departs from Jabalpur Junction and at 14:20 it arrives at Ajmer Junction.
- 12182 Dayodaya Express covers total journey of 1022 kilometers. At 15:25 it departs from Ajmer Junction and at 08:35 it arrives at Jabalpur Junction.

== Route and halts ==
- Jabalpur Junction
- Katni Murwara
- Damoh
- Saugor
- Guna Junction
- Kota Junction
- Sawai Madhopur Junction
- Durgapura
- Jaipur Junction
- Phulera Junction
- Kishangarh
- Ajmer Junction

== Traction ==
It is hauled by a Tughlakabad Loco Shed-based WAP-7 electric locomotive from AII upto KOTA. From KOTA to JBP it is hauled by a Itarsi Loco Shed-based WAP-7 electric locomotive and vice versa.

== Direction reversals ==
The train reverses its direction 2 times at:-

- Kota Junction
- Sawai Madhopur Junction.

== See also ==
- Jabalpur–H.Nizamuddin Express
- Jabalpur Junction
- Ajmer Junction
