= Patharia =

- city
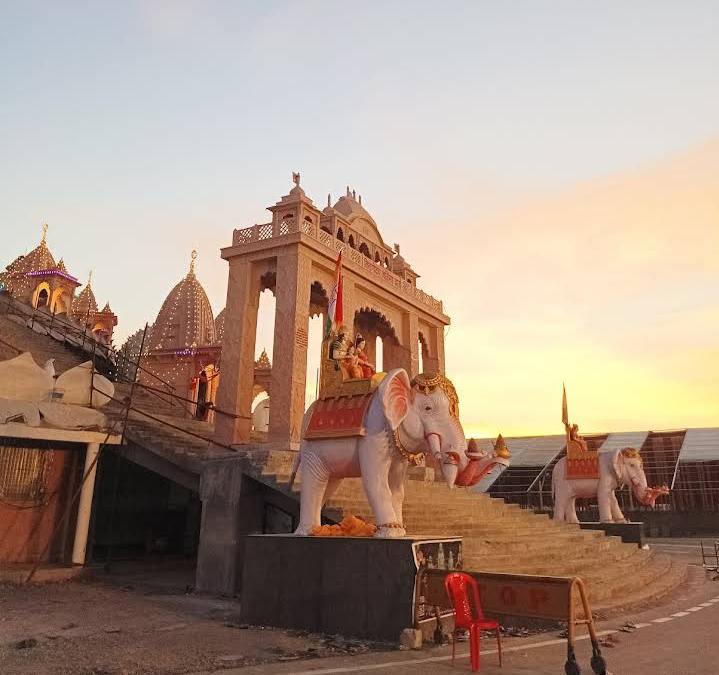
- Viragodaya Jain Mandir, Pathariya

- Location in Madhya Pradesh, India Patharia (India)
- Coordinates: 23.90°N 79.21°E
- Country: India
- State: Madhya Pradesh
- District: Damoh
- Founder: Rajputana king
- Elevation: 358 m (1,175 ft)

Population (2011)
  - Total: 21,026

Languages
  - Official: Hindi
- Time zone: UTC+5:30 (IST)
- ISO 3166 code: IN-MP
- Vehicle registration: MP

Patharia is a town and a nagar panchayat in Damoh district in the Indian state of Madhya Pradesh. During World War II, the town served as the training camp for what would become Wingate's Chindits.

== Geography ==
=== Location ===
Patharia is located at 23.90°N 79.21°E. It is at an average elevation of 595 metres (1,952 ft). Sunar River flows near the Town.

=== Climate ===
Climate data for Patharia (1981–2010, extremes 1970–2011)
Month	Jan	Feb	Mar	Apr	May	Jun	Jul	Aug	Sep	Oct	Nov	Dec	Year
Record high °C (°F)	33.3 (91.9)	37.2 (99.0)	41.0 (105.8)	45.2 (113.4)	49.8 (121.6)	46.6 (115.9)	42.6 (108.7)	38.4 (101.1)	38.2 (100.8)	39.2 (102.6)	37.0 (98.6)	32.0 (89.6)	49.8 (121.6)
Mean maximum °C (°F)	30.5 (86.9)	33.4 (92.1)	38.1 (100.6)	43.1 (109.6)	45.9 (114.6)	44.1 (111.4)	37.4 (99.3)	34.4 (93.9)	34.8 (94.6)	35.8 (96.4)	33.9 (93.0)	29.4 (84.9)	45.2 (113.4)
Mean daily maximum °C (°F)	25.2 (77.4)	28.9 (84.0)	33.7 (92.7)	39.1 (102.4)	42.4 (108.3)	39.3 (102.7)	32.7 (90.9)	30.8 (87.4)	31.7 (89.1)	33.1 (91.6)	30.1 (86.2)	25.9 (78.6)	32.7 (90.9)
Mean daily minimum °C (°F)	8.5 (47.3)	11.9 (53.4)	17.1 (62.8)	22.3 (72.1)	26.8 (80.2)	26.8 (80.2)	24.5 (76.1)	23.6 (74.5)	22.9 (73.2)	19.0 (66.2)	13.8 (56.8)	9.1 (48.4)	18.9 (66.0)
Mean minimum °C (°F)	4.0 (39.2)	7.2 (45.0)	11.9 (53.4)	17.1 (62.8)	22 (72)	22.7 (72.9)	22.3 (72.1)	21.7 (71.1)	20.2 (68.4)	14.0 (57.2)	9.3 (48.7)	5.9 (42.6)	4.1 (39.4)
Record low °C (°F)	0.5 (32.9)	1.6 (34.9)	7.0 (44.6)	14.6 (58.3)	19.0 (66.2)	19.8 (67.6)	18.0 (64.4)	19.0 (66.2)	15.0 (59.0)	10.5 (50.9)	5.0 (41.0)	2.5 (36.5)	0.5 (32.9)
Average rainfall mm (inches)	11.6 (0.46)	17.8 (0.70)	8.4 (0.33)	3.7 (0.15)	8.6 (0.34)	119.4 (4.70)	305.4 (12.02)	435.1 (17.13)	181.4 (7.14)	32.7 (1.29)	13.8 (0.54)	7.7 (0.30)	1,145.6 (45.10)
Average rainy days	1.1	1.6	0.8	0.4	0.7	6.2	12.8	15.7	8.1	1.8	0.8	0.7	50.6
Average relative humidity (%)	67	60	48	37	38	55	79	84	81	65	60	65	61
Source: India Meteorological Department

== Demographics ==
As of the 2011 Census of India, Patharia is a Nagar Panchayat city in district of Damoh, Madhya Pradesh. The Patharia city is divided into 15 wards for which elections are held every 5 years. The Patharia Nagar Panchayat has population of 21,026 of which 11,008 are males while 10,018 are females as Census India 2011.

== Economy ==
Its people depend on farming and business. The region is predominantly agrarian. Sunar is a major river of the Area. Some big Factories available here. Cement factory and Soybeans Processing mill are here. Here is lime stone mines in Satpara .

== Education ==
For higher secondary education, there is the government school named School Of Excellence Patharia. Many other private School situated in Patharia.

For higher education, there is Madhavrao Sapre Government College Patharia.

== Notable people ==
- (Late) Pt Ram Chandra Dubey, Freedom Fighter & Educationalist
- Madhavrao Sapre, an author
- Sahodrabai Rai, a politician
- Lakhan Patel, a politician and minister

== Transportation ==
Patharia is connected with Damoh, Sagar, Katni, Jabalpur and Chhatarpur by roads.

Patharia is a Railway Station on Bina Katni Line and connected with major Cities of Madhya Pradesh.
