= Jabalpur railway division =

Railway division of India

JABALPUR

General information
- Location: Jabalpur Junction railway station India
- Coordinates: 23°09′53″N 79°57′04″E
- Elevation: 410 metres (1,350 ft)
- System: Railway Division
- Owner: Indian Railways
- Operator: West Central Railways
- Line: Howrah-Allahabad-Mumbai line

Other information
- Status: Functioning
- Fare zone: West Central Railway zone

History
- Opened: April 1952, 01; 74 years ago
Location

Jabalpur railway division is one of the three railway divisions under West Central Railway zone (WCR) of Indian Railways. This railway division was formed on 1 April 1952 and its headquarters are located at Jabalpur city in the state of Madhya Pradesh of India. It has 107 railway stations under its jurisdiction. Bhopal railway division and Kota railway division are the other two railway divisions under WCR Zone headquartered at Jabalpur.

== Jurisdiction ==
The jurisdiction of Jabalpur division is as follows:

- Manikpur (excluding) to Itarsi (excluding) & Satna (including) - Rewa (including) on Howrah-Mumbai route.
- Bina (Excluding) to Katni (including) on Delhi-Jabalpur route.
- Katni (including) to Singrauli (excluding) on Jabalpur-Howrah route.

== List of railway stations and towns ==
The list includes the three stations under the Jabalpur railway division and their station category.

Category of station	No. of stations	Names of stations
A-1	1	Jabalpur Junction , Satna Junction
A	7	Katni Junction, Damoh, Rewa, Maihar, Pipariya, Sagar
B	4	Katni Murwara, Madan Mahal, Narsinghpur, Gadarwara
C suburban station	0	-
D	11	Bandakpur, Bankhedi, Beohari, Jaitwar, Kareli, Khurai, Makronia, Patharia, Sohagpur, Sihora Road, Shridham
E	67	Adhartal, Amdara, Aslana, Bagahaird, Baghora, Bagra Tawa, Bakhleta, Bargawan, Beldkhera, Bhadanpur, Bheraghat, Bhitoni, Bikrampur, Bohani, Chhateni, Chitehara, Deoragram, Deori, Dubri Kalan, Dundi, Ganeshganj, Ghatera, Ghatpindari, Girwar, Gollapatti, Gosalpur, Guramkhedi, Gurra, Hardua, Hinautaramban, Isharwara, Jeruwakhera, Joba, Jukehi, Kaima, Karakbel, Karhlyabhadoli, Katangi Khurd, Khanna Banjari, Khutaha, Lagargawan, Lidhora Khurd, Mahroi, Majhgawan, Majhgawan Phatak, Markundi, Malkhedi, Nariaoli, Niwar, Niwas Road, Pakaria Road, Patwara, Rethi, Sagma, Sagoni, Salaiya, Salhana, Salichauka Road, Sarai Gram, Sleemanabad, Sontalai, Sumreri, Sakariya, Tikariya, Turki Road, Unchera, Vijaysota.
F halt station	17	Bara, Bharsendi, Dangidahar, Gajra bahra, Hati, Junehta, Kanchanpur road, Karapgaon, Lachakharih, Madhavnagar road, Majholi, Marwasgram, Patohan, Sansarpur road, Shankarpur bhadoura, Shobhapur, Surasaraighatjhara, Katni South, New Katni Junction.
Total	107	-

== Tourist places ==
Jabalpur Railway Division provides rail connectivity to "Kanha Kisli", "Bandhavgarh" and "Pench" tiger reserves and national parks. Dhuan-Dhar waterfall of Bhera-ghat is located nearly 20 km from Jabalpur city.
