= Jabalpur–Hazrat Nizamuddin Express =

Train in India

Jabalpur–New Delhi Superfast Express
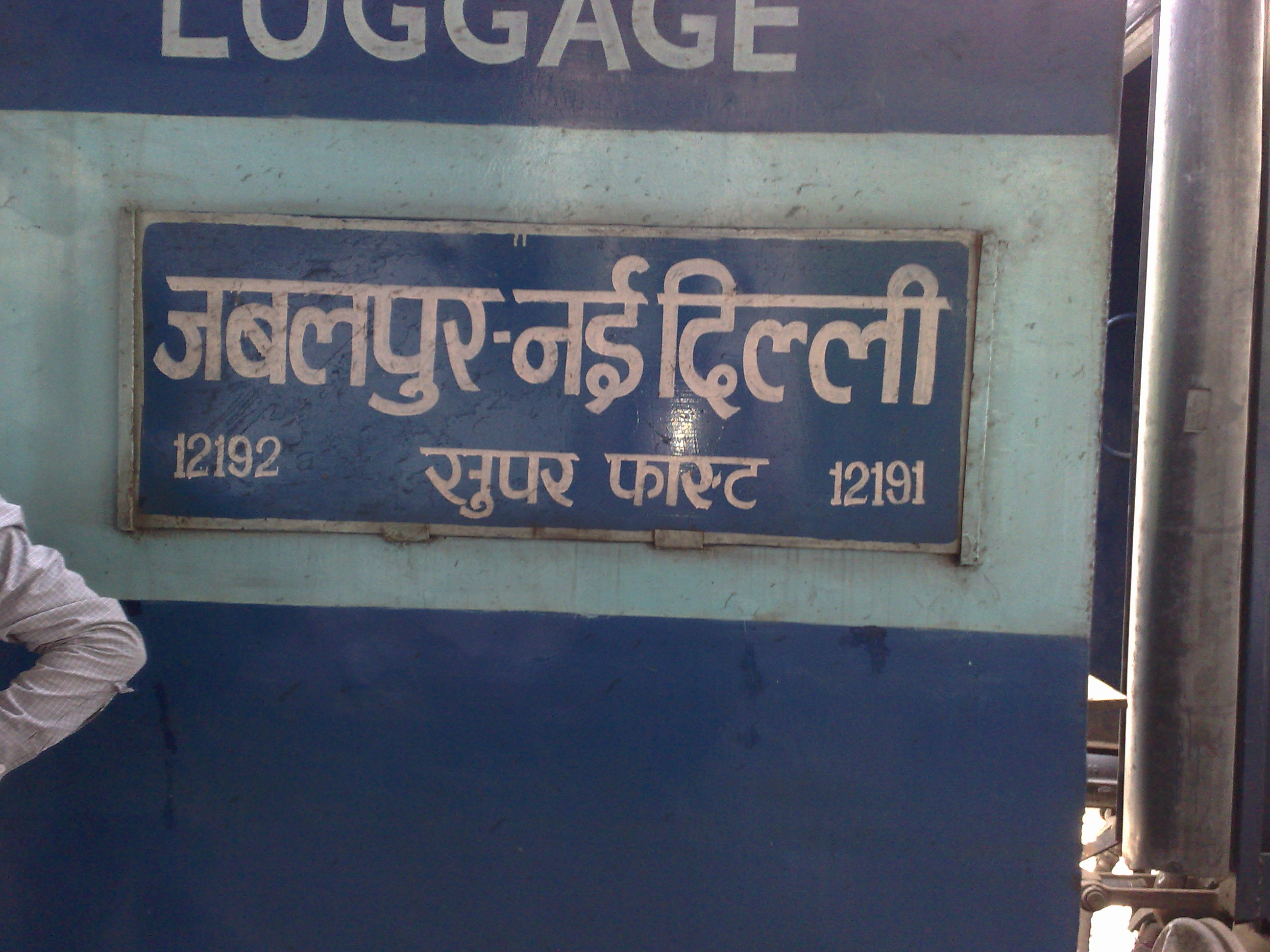

Overview
- Service type: Superfast
- Locale: Madhya Pradesh, Rajasthan, Uttar Pradesh, Haryana & Delhi
- Current operator: West Central Railways

Route
- Termini: Jabalpur Junction (JBP); Hazrat Nizamuddin (NZM)
- Stops: 21
- Distance travelled: 1,038 km (645 mi)
- Average journey time: 18 hours approx
- Service frequency: Daily
- Train number: 12191 / 12192

On-board services
- Classes: AC 1 Tier, AC 2 Tier, AC 3 Tier, Sleeper 3 Tier, Unreserved
- Seating arrangements: Yes
- Sleeping arrangements: Yes
- Auto-rack arrangements: Available
- Catering facilities: On-board catering E-catering
- Observation facilities: Rake sharing with 12181/12182 Dayodaya Express
- Entertainment facilities: Yes
- Baggage facilities: Available

Technical
- Rolling stock: ICF coach
- Track gauge: 1,676 mm (5 ft 6 in)
- Operating speed: 60 km/h (37 mph) average with halts
Route map
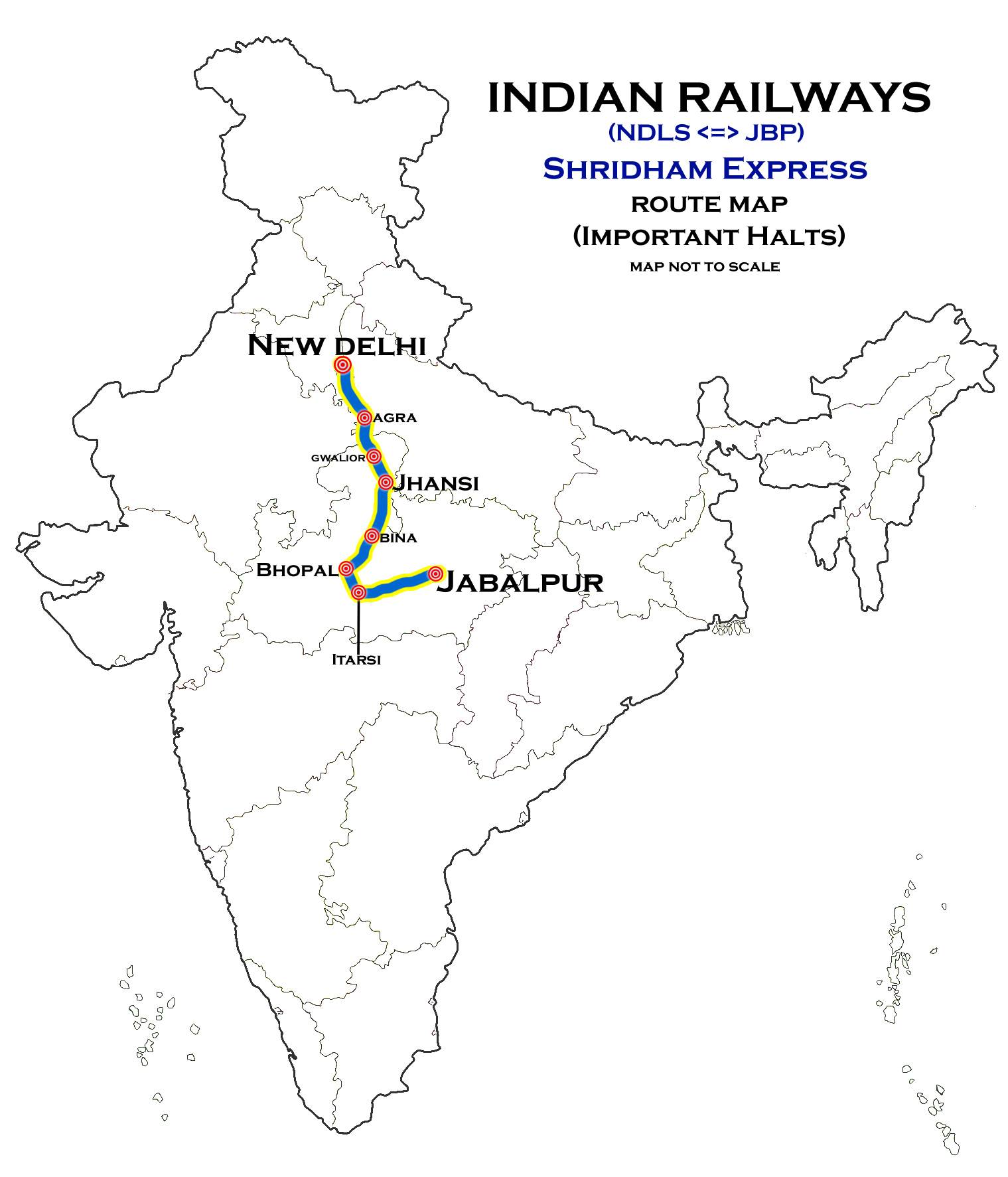

The 12191 / 12192 Jabalpur–New Delhi Superfast Express also known as Shridham Express (श्रीधाम एक्सप्रेस) is a daily Superfast e of Madhya Pradesh and Hazrat Nizamuddin railway station of Delhi, the capital city of India.

== Arrival and departure ==
Train no.12192 departs from Jabalpur daily at 17:30 hrs. reaching Hazrat Nizamuddin the next day at 11:35 hrs. Train no.12191 departs from Hazrat Nizamuddin, daily at 14:15 hrs., reaching Jabalpur the next day at 07:15 hrs.

== Route and halts ==
The train goes via Gadarwara, Itarsi Junction & Bhopal Junction. The important halts of the train are :

- Jabalpur Junction
- Jabalpur Madan Mahal
- Gotegaon
- Narsinghpur
- Gadarwara
- Pipariya
- Itarsi Junction
- Hoshangabad
- Rani Kamalapati
- Bhopal Junction
- Vidisha
- Ganj Basoda
- Bina Junction
- Lalitpur
- Jhansi Junction
- Datia
- Gwalior Junction
- Morena
- Dholpur
- Agra Cantt.
- Mathura Junction
- Hazrat Nizamuddin

== Coach composition ==
The train consists of 17 coaches :

- 1 AC cum 2 AC I Tier [HA 1]
- 1 AC II Tier
- 3 AC III Tier
- 8 Sleeper coaches
- 6 Un Reserved
- 1 Ladies/Handy Capped
- 1 Luggage/Brake Van

== Average speed and frequency ==
The train runs with an average speed of 70 km/h. The train runs on a daily basis.

== Loco link ==
The train is hauled by a Tughlakabad-based WAP-7 or Itarsi-based WAP-4 locomotive from end to end.

== Rake sharing ==
The train sharing its rake with 12181/12182 Dayodaya Express.

== Rake maintenance ==
The train is maintained by the Jabalpur Coaching Depot.

== See also ==
- Dayodaya Express
- Jabalpur Junction
- Bhopal Junction
