= Damoh railway station =

Railway station in Madhya Pradesh, India

Damoh

General information
- Location: Damoh, Damoh district, Madhya Pradesh; India
- Coordinates: 23°50′10″N 79°25′56″E
- Elevation: 383 metres (1,257 ft)
- System: Indian Railways station
- Owner: Indian Railways
- Operator: West Central Railway
- Line: Bina–Katni line
- Platforms: 3
- Tracks: 12

Construction
- Structure type: Standard (on ground)
- Parking: Yes
- Cycle facilities: Yes

Other information
- Status: Functioning
- Station code: DMO
- Zone(s): West Central Railway
- Division(s): Jabalpur
Location
- Location within Madhya Pradesh Location within India

Damoh railway station is a railway station serving Damoh city, in Damoh district of Madhya Pradesh. Damoh is a 'A' Category railway station of West Central Railway Zone of Indian Railways. Its code is DMO. It serves Damoh city. The station consists of three platforms. Passenger, Express and Superfast trains halt here.

== Structure ==
It is located at 383 m above sea level and has three platforms.It is located on Katni - Bina main line of the Indian Railways.

== Major trains ==
The following trains originate from Damoh railway station:

- Bhopal–Damoh Rajya Rani Express
- Damoh–Bina Passenger
- Damoh-Kota Passenger
