= Vindhyachal Express =

Train in India

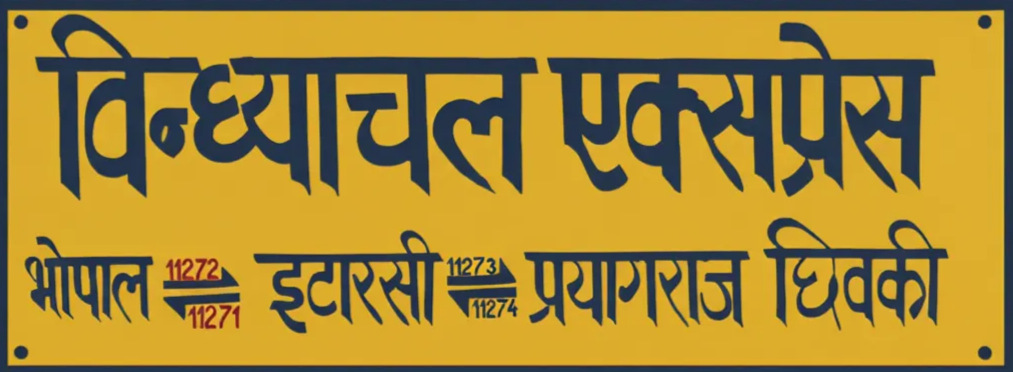

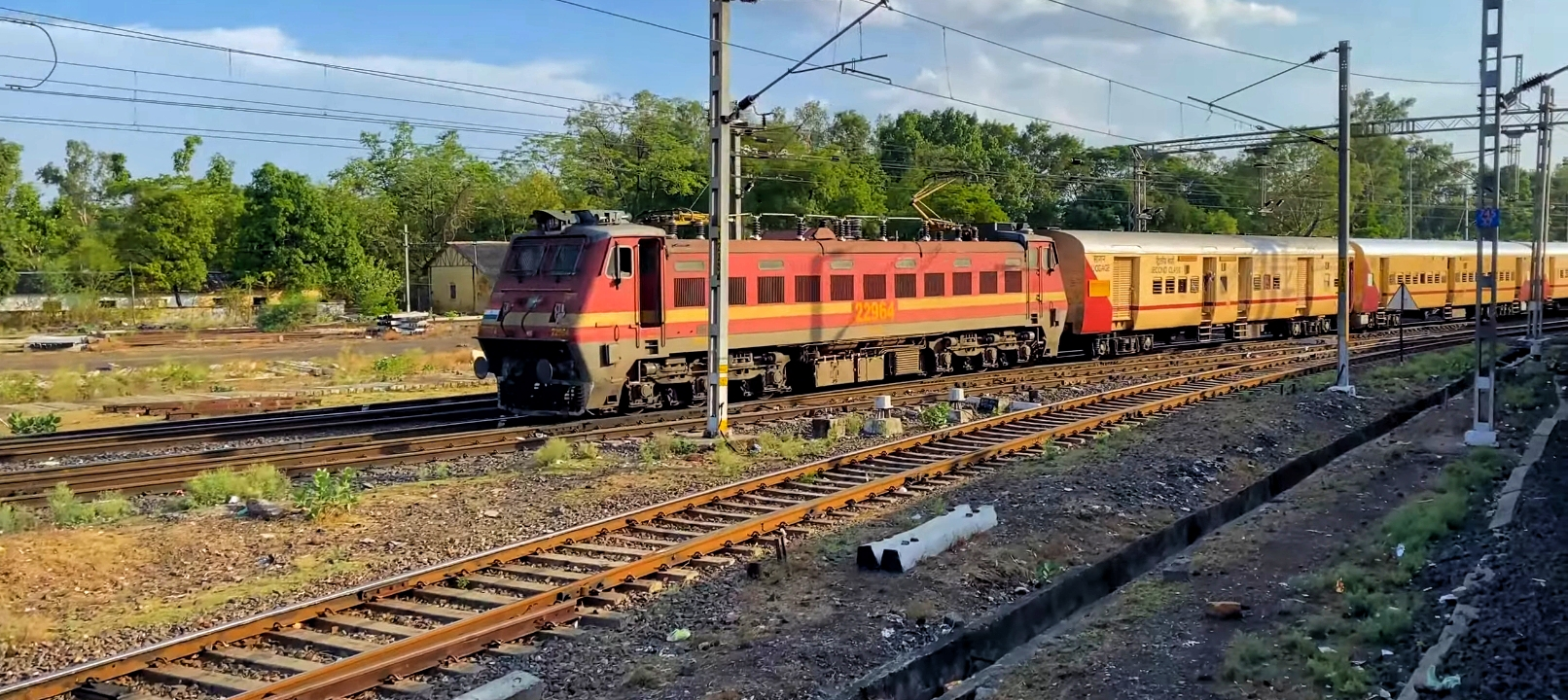
- Vindhyachal Express At Itarsi Junction railway station

Overview
- Service type: Express
- Locale: Madhya Pradesh
- First service: 1 March 1955; 71 years ago
- Current operator: West Central Railway

Route
- Termini: Itarsi (ET); Bhopal (BPL)
- Stops: 37
- Distance travelled: 735 km (457 mi)
- Average journey time: 18 hours approx.
- Service frequency: Daily
- Train number: 11271 / 11272

On-board services
- Classes: AC 3 Tier, Sleeper Class, General Unreserved
- Seating arrangements: Yes
- Sleeping arrangements: Yes
- Catering facilities: E-catering
- Observation facilities: Large windows
- Baggage facilities: Below the seats

Technical
- Rolling stock: ICF coach
- Track gauge: 1,676 mm (5 ft 6 in)
- Operating speed: 41 km/h (25 mph) average including halts.
Route map
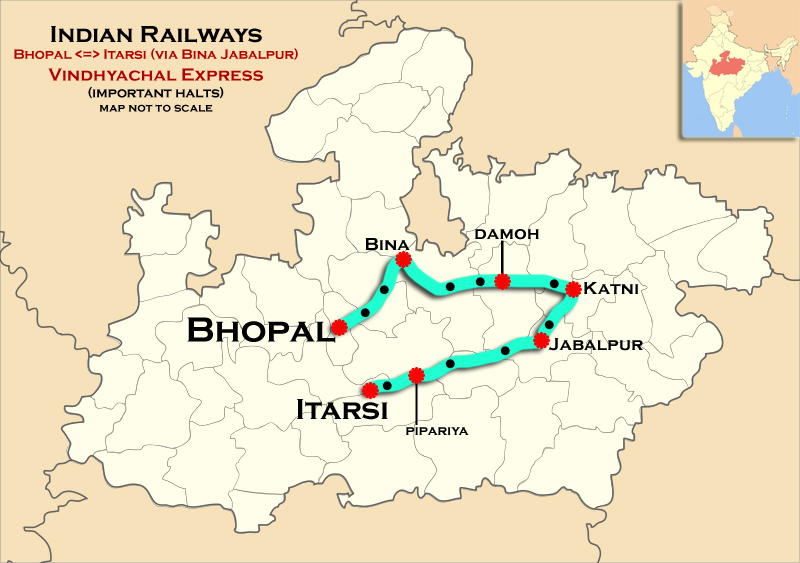
- Vindhyachal Express (Bhopal–Itarsi) route map

The 11271 / 11272 Vindhyachal Express is an express train service operated by West Central Railway zone. It runs between Bhopal Junction and Itarsi Junction in Madhya Pradesh. The name Vindhyachal signifies the Vindhyachal hill valley of Madhya Pradesh state.

== Number ==
The numbers allotted for the train are:

- 11271 – Itarsi Junction to Bhopal Junction.
- 11272 – Bhopal Junction to Itarsi Junction.

== Route and halts ==
The Vindhyachal Express operates daily, connecting Itarsi Junction and Bhopal Junction. The train traverses through various important stations across Madhya Pradesh. The detailed schedule for both directions is provided below.

=== Train 11271: Itarsi to Bhopal ===
Schedule for Train 11271
Day	Station Name	Arrival	Departure	Halt (min)	Distance (km)
1	Itarsi Jn		16:20	0	0
1	Guramkhedi	16:49	16:50	1	39.0
1	Sohagpur	16:59	17:00	1	48.8
1	Pipariya	17:13	17:15	2	66.7
1	Bankhedi	17:29	17:30	1	85.3
1	Salichauka Road	17:44	17:45	1	102.0
1	Gadarwara	17:58	18:00	2	115.9
1	Bohani	18:09	18:10	1	128.9
1	Kareli	18:23	18:25	2	144.4
1	Narsinghpur	18:38	18:40	2	160.3
1	Belkhera	18:50	18:52	2	171.6
1	Karak Bel	19:09	19:10	1	176.0
1	Shridham	19:28	19:30	2	191.4
1	Bhitoni	19:43	19:45	2	214.8
1	Bheraghat	19:54	19:56	2	227.9
1	Madan Mahal	20:23	20:25	2	241.0
1	Jabalpur	20:55	21:05	10	244.4
1	Deori	21:23	21:25	2	261.3
1	Gosalpur	21:33	21:35	2	271.9
1	Sihora Road	21:43	21:45	2	282.9
1	Dundi	21:53	21:55	2	297.9
1	Sleemanabad Road	22:03	22:05	2	307.4
1	Katni Murwara	22:45	22:50	5	335.3
1	Rithi	23:13	23:15	2	365.4
1	Salaia	23:33	23:35	2	384.0
2	Bandakpur	00:08	00:10	2	429.1
2	Damoh	00:35	00:40	5	444.5
2	GaneshGanj	01:38	01:40	2	483.5
2	Makronia	02:08	02:10	2	514.5
2	Saugor	02:30	02:40	10	521.6
2	Jeruwa Khera	03:48	03:50	2	556.5
2	Khurai	04:28	04:30	2	574.4
2	Bina Jn	06:35	06:45	10	596.1
2	Mandi Bamora	07:04	07:06	2	613.5
2	Ganj Basoda	07:27	07:29	2	641.9
2	GulabGanj	07:44	07:46	2	660.3
2	Vidisha	08:03	08:05	2	681.4
2	Sanchi	08:18	08:20	2	690.8
2	Bhopal Jn	10:20		0	734.8

=== Train 11272: Bhopal to Itarsi ===
Schedule for Train 11272
Day	Station Name	Arrival	Departure	Halt (min)	Distance (km)
1	Bhopal Jn		18:20	0	0
1	Sanchi	18:54	18:56	2	44.0
1	Vidisha	19:09	19:10	1	53.4
1	GulabGanj	19:28	19:30	2	74.5
1	Ganj Basoda	19:43	19:45	2	92.9
1	Mandi Bamora	20:15	20:17	2	121.3
1	Bina Jn	20:40	20:50	10	138.7
1	Khurai	21:23	21:25	2	160.4
1	Jeruwa Khera	21:43	21:45	2	178.3
1	Saugor	22:55	23:05	10	213.2
1	Makronia	23:18	23:20	2	220.3
1	GaneshGanj	23:43	23:45	2	251.3
2	Damoh	00:30	00:40	10	290.3
2	Bandakpur	01:03	01:05	2	305.7
2	Salaia	01:38	01:40	2	350.8
2	Rithi	02:08	02:10	2	369.4
2	Katni Murwara	03:45	03:50	5	399.5
2	Sleemanabad Road	04:23	04:25	2	427.4
2	Dundi	04:38	04:40	2	436.9
2	Sihora Road	05:18	05:20	2	451.9
2	Gosalpur	05:28	05:30	2	462.9
2	Deori	05:43	05:45	2	473.5
2	Jabalpur	06:25	06:35	10	490.4
2	Madan Mahal	06:48	06:50	2	493.8
2	Bheraghat	07:28	07:30	2	506.9
2	Bhitoni	07:38	07:40	2	520.0
2	Shridham	07:58	08:00	2	543.3
2	Karak Bel	08:23	08:25	2	558.8
2	Belkhera	08:36	08:38	2	563.2
2	Narsinghpur	08:50	08:52	2	574.5
2	Kareli	09:03	09:05	2	590.3
2	Bohani	09:18	09:20	2	605.9
2	Gadarwara	09:38	09:40	2	618.9
2	Salichauka Road	09:48	09:50	2	632.8
2	Bankhedi	10:13	10:15	2	649.4
2	Pipariya	10:43	10:45	2	668.0
2	Sohagpur	10:58	11:00	2	686.0
2	Guramkhedi	11:23	11:25	2	695.8
2	Itarsi Jn	12:20		0	734.8

== Loco link ==
The train is hauled by an Itarsi Loco Shed-based WAP-7 or WAG-5 electric locomotive from end to end.

== Coach composition ==
Normally the train consists of 15 ICF coaches as follows:

- 1 AC III Tier
- 4 Sleeper
- 8 General
- 2 Luggage cum Parcel
