= Bhopal Junction railway station =

Railway junction station in Madhya Pradesh, India

BHOPAL JUNCTION

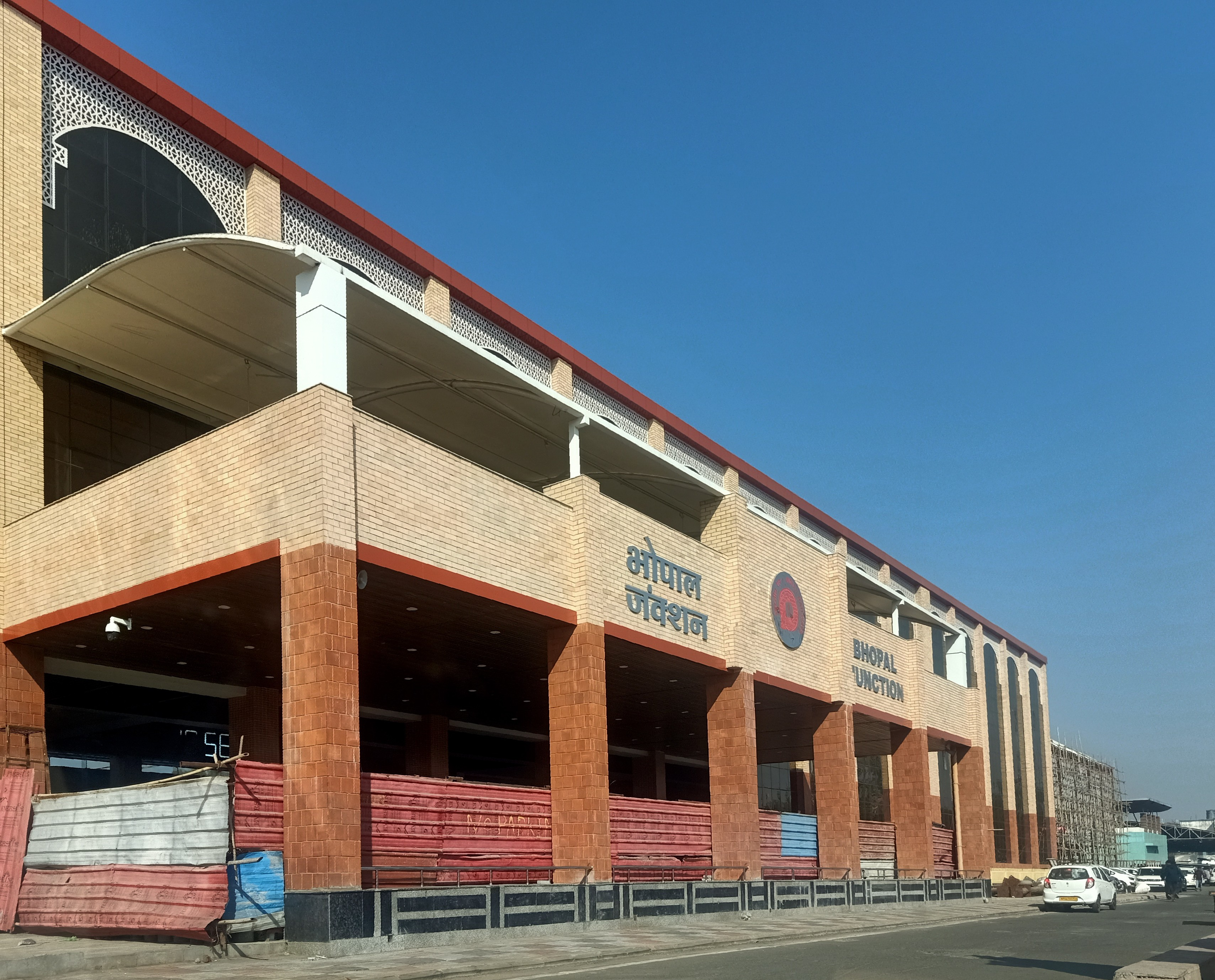
- Bhopal railway station

General information
- Location: Bhopal Main Junction, Near Nadra Bus Stand, Bhopal, Madhya Pradesh; India
- Coordinates: 23.267212°N 77.412970°E
- System: Rapid transit, Regional rail, Light rail & Commuter rail station
- Owner: Indian Railways
- Operator: West Central Railways
- Lines: New Delhi–Chennai main line, Agra–Bhopal section, Bhopal–Nagpur section, Ujjain–Bhopal section, Bhopal–RamGanj Mandi line
- Platforms: 6
- Tracks: 9
- Connections: Taxi Stand, Auto Stand

Construction
- Structure type: Standard on ground
- Parking: Yes
- Accessible: Available

Other information
- Status: Functioning
- Station code: BPL
- Zone(s): West Central Railway zone
- Division(s): Bhopal

History
- Opened: 1889; 137 years ago

Passengers
- 60,000 Avg per day

Services
Preceding station	Indian Railways	Following station
Rani Kamalapati towards ?	New Delhi–Chennai main line	Nishatpura towards ?
Sant Hirdaram Nagar towards ?	Bhopal–Ujjain branch line	Terminus
Location
- Location within Bhopal Location within Madhya Pradesh
- Interactive map

Bhopal Junction railway station (station code: BPL) is a major railway junction of India and main railway station of Bhopal, the capital of the central Indian state of Madhya Pradesh. This station also serves as a connecting point for various pilgrims from Asia to visit the Stupa of Sanchi, an important Buddhist stupa, which is about 40 kilometres (25 mi) from this station.

== History ==
The Bhopal–Itarsi section of New Delhi–Chennai main line was opened in 1884. Jhansi–Bhopal section was opened in 1889. In 1895, the Ujjain–Bhopal section was opened. The station building was constructed in year 1910.

In 1984, the station was affected by the Bhopal disaster, when toxic gas fumes from a nearby chemical plant leaked. In the station, staff, passengers, people fleeing the gases and other persons present died and were injured from inhaling these gases. Station staff still tried to alarm nearby stations not to send trains towards Bhopal. The station master made a stationary train, the Gorakhpur to Mumbai Express, leave immediately ahead of departure time to save the people on board.

== Rail lines ==
Bhopal has following rail lines:

- New Delhi – Chennai main line - existing: Connect North India with South India, runs via Mathura-Agra-Bhopal-Nagpur-Hyderabad. In 2026, it has 3 parallel tracks and fourth track is under-construction.
- Ratlam-Ujjain–Bhopal line - existing: Connect Bhopal to western Madhya Pradesh and beyond to Rajasthan.
- Bhopal-Ramganj Mandi line - under-construction with target completion by December 2027: a new Rs3,035 cr 276-km long greenfield line connecting Bhopal in the southeast to Kota in northwest via Ramganj Mandi-Aklera-Rajgarh-Biaora. In March 2026, 50% of the 276 km track was complete (Ramganj Mandi-Rajgarh section in the north) and the remaining Rajgarh-Bhopal section in the south was under-construction.

== Passenger services ==
=== Facilities ===
The station has 6 platforms in addition to enough waiting halls, refreshment centre, passenger ticket counter and ticket vending machines, vehicle parking, communication facility, sanitary facility and dedicated Government Railway Police force to ensure security.

=== Train services ===
Bhopal Junction railway station is located on the main Delhi–Chennai route which halts more than 200 daily trains, with a total of more than 380 trains within a week. To the north of the Bhopal Junction lies Bina Junction, to the south lies Itarsi Junction. There is one track which connects Bhopal to the west with Ujjain Junction, Sehore, Shujalpur, Ratlam Junction and Ahmedabad Junction. Also to some portion of Indore Junction, Sehore, Shujalpur and Dewas Junction.

== Other railway stations within Bhopal city ==
Other railway stations serving Bhopal metropolitan area

- Rani Kamalapati railway station
- Misrod railway station
- Nishatpura railway station
- Sant Hirdaram Nagar railway station

== Gallery ==
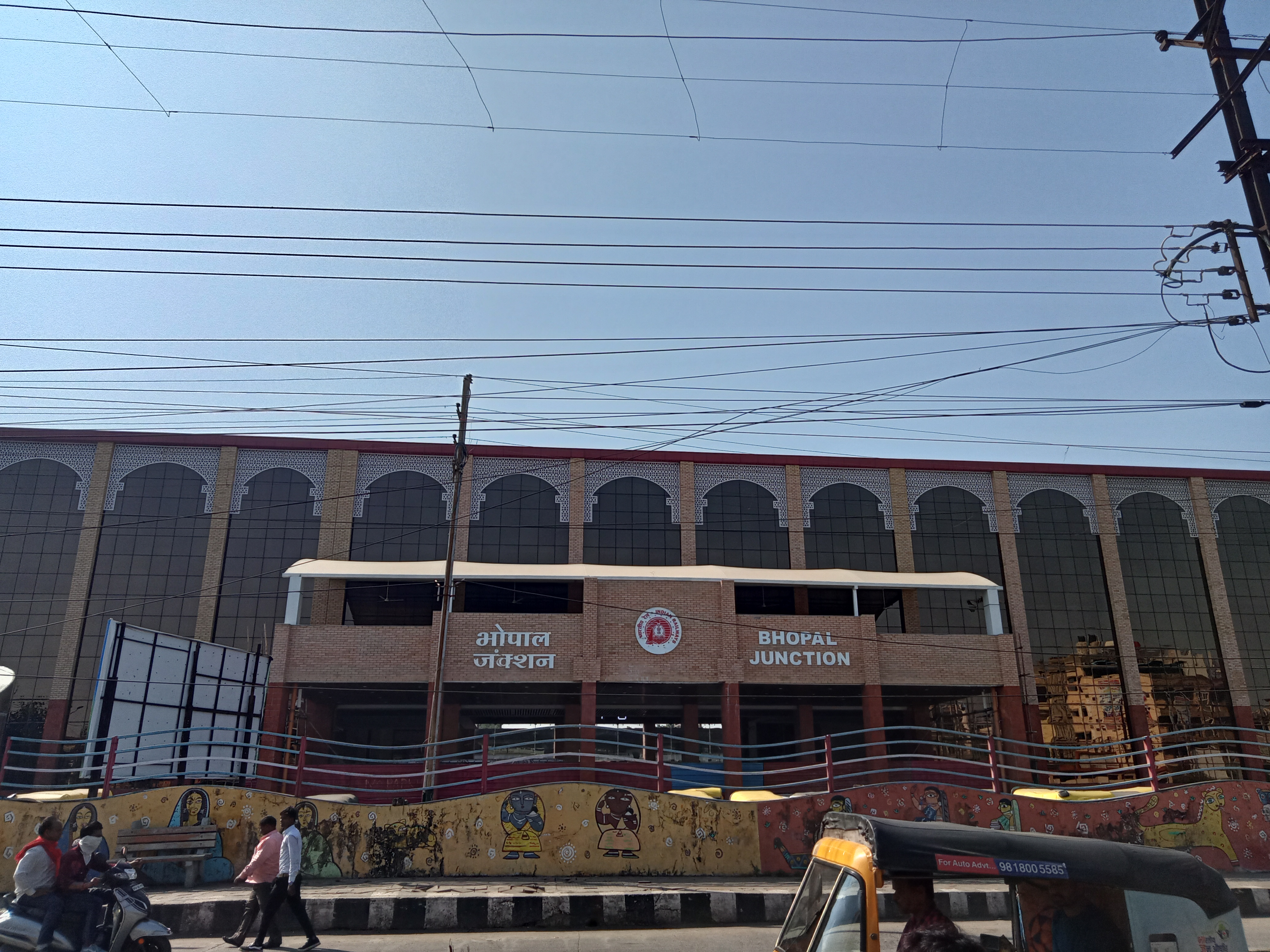
Main building, 2022

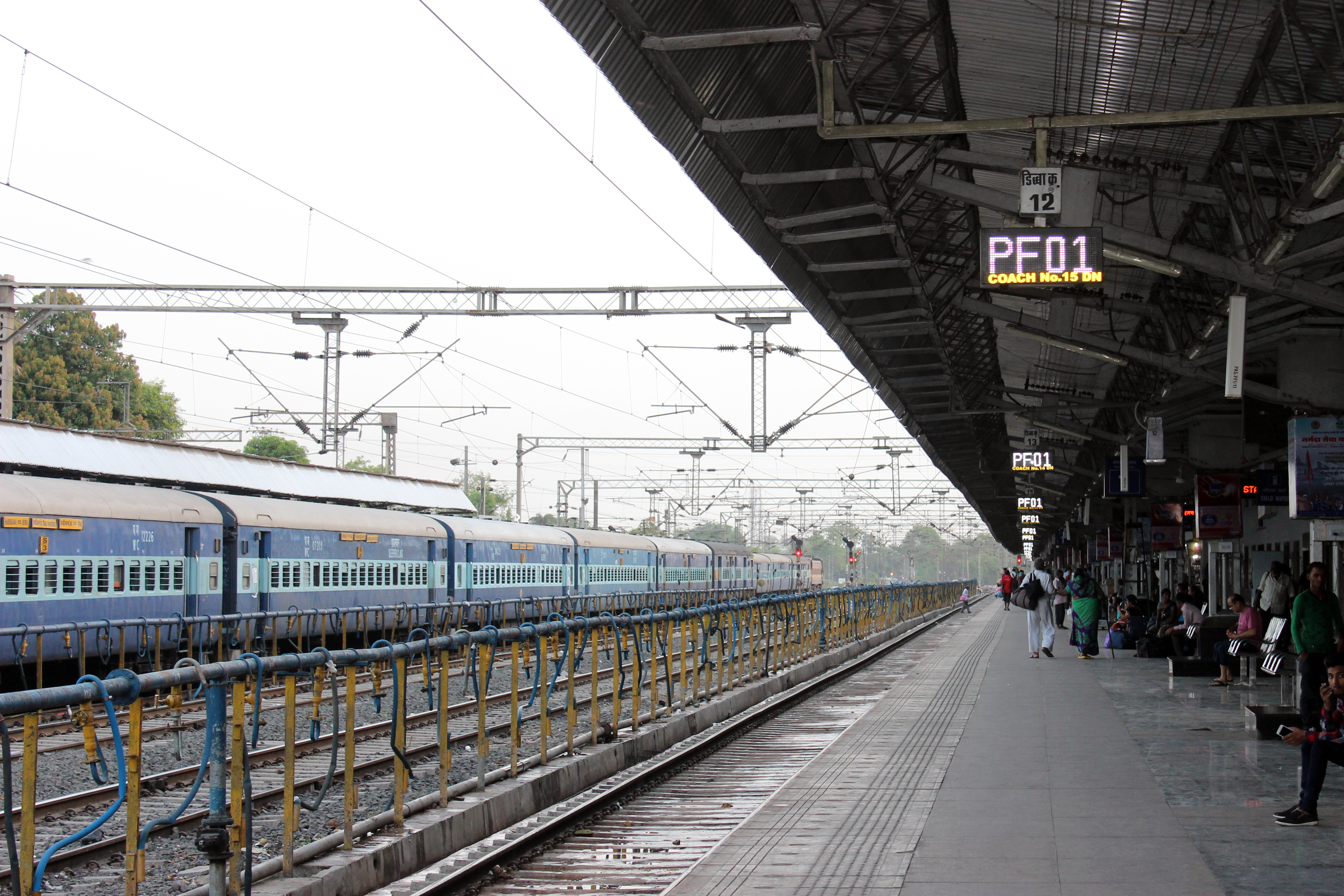
Platform No. 1 Bhopal Railway Station, April 2017

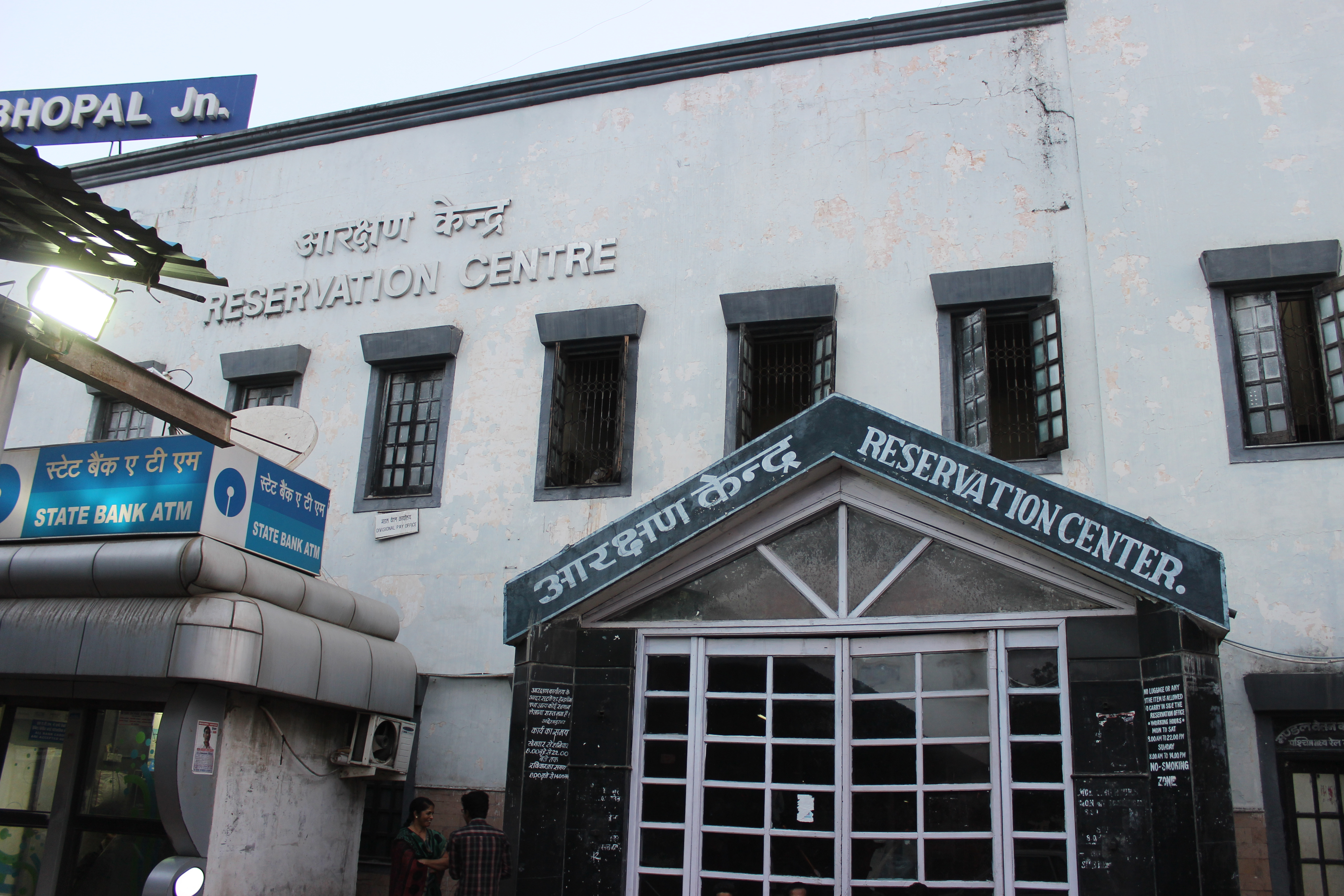
Railway Reservation Center Bhopal, 2017

== See also ==
- Bhoj Metro, Bhopal metro trains
- Future of rail transport in India
- Rail transport in Madhya Pradesh
