= Pune–Beed Express =

Train in India

Pune - Beed Express

Overview
- Service type: Express
- Status: Active
- Locale: Maharashtra
- First service: 22 September 2026; 2 days ago
- Current operator: Central Railway (CR)

Route
- Termini: Pune Junction (PUNE); Beed (BEED)
- Stops: 9
- Distance travelled: 321 km (199 mi)
- Average journey time: 7h 15m
- Service frequency: Daily
- Train number: 11433 / 11434

On-board services
- Classes: General Unreserved, Sleeper Class, AC 3rd Class, AC 2nd Class
- Seating arrangements: Yes
- Sleeping arrangements: Yes
- Catering facilities: On-board Catering; E-Catering
- Observation facilities: Large windows
- Baggage facilities: No
- Other facilities: Below the seats

Technical
- Rolling stock: LHB coach
- Track gauge: 1,676 mm (5 ft 6 in)
- Electrification: 25 kV 50 Hz AC overhead line
- Operating speed: 44 km/h (27 mph) average including halts
- Track owner: Indian Railways

The 11433 / 11434 Pune–Beed Express is an express train belonging to Central Railway zone that runs between the city Pune Junction and Beed of Maharashtra in India.

It operates as train number 11433 from Pune Junction to Beed and as train number 11434 in the reverse direction, serving the state of Maharashtra.

== Services ==
- 11433 / Pune–Beed Express has an average speed of 44 km/h and covers 321 km in 7h 15m.
- 11434 / Beed–Pune Express has an average speed of 41 km/h and covers 321 km in 7h 50m.

== Schedule ==
- 11433 – 10:45 PM (Daily) [Pune Junction]
- 11434 – 9:30 PM (Daily) [Beed]

== Routes and halts ==
The important halts of the train are :

- Pune Junction
- Uruli
- Daund Chord Line
- Shrigonda
- Ahilyanagar Junction
- Narayandoho
- New Ashti
- Amalner
- Beed

== Coach composition ==
The train has 13 coaches are :

1. General Unreserved - 4
2. Sleeper Class - 6
3. AC 3rd Class - 2
4. AC 2nd Class - 1

== Traction ==
As the entire route is electrified, it is hauled by a Bhusawal Loco Shed-based WAP-7 electric locomotive from Pune Junction to Beed and vice versa.

== Rake reversal or rake share ==
The train will reverse 1 time :

1. Ahilyanagar Junction

== See also ==
Trains from Pune Junction :

1. Pune–Howrah Duronto Express
2. Pune–Rani Kamalapati Humsafar Express
3. Jhelum Express
4. Kanyakumari–Pune Express
5. Pune–Nagpur Express

No trains from Beed :

== Notes ==
a. Runs daily in a week in both directions.
