= Campion School, Bhopal =

Private school in Madhya Pradesh, India

Campion School

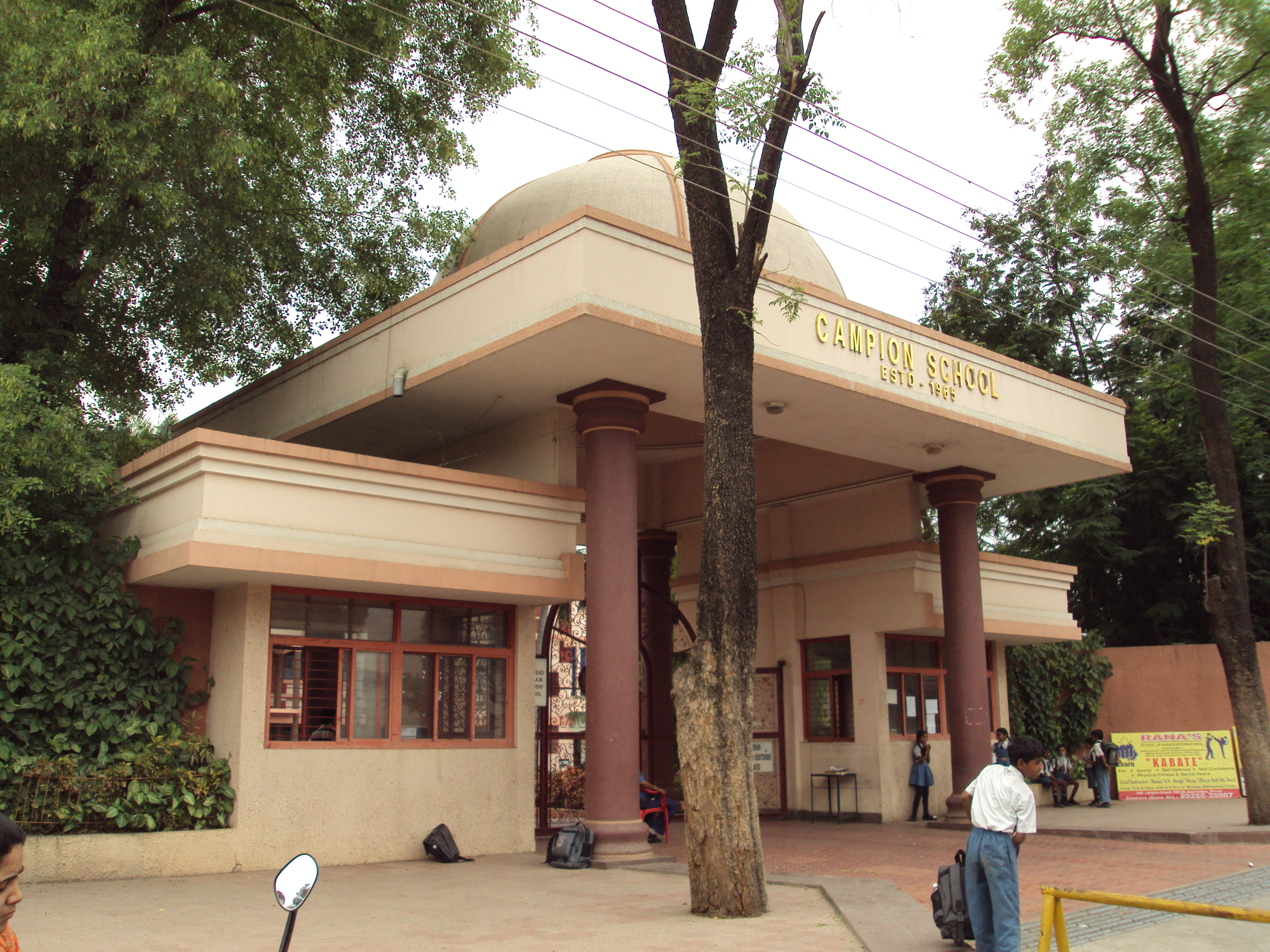
- Entrance to the school

Location
- Bhopal, Madhya Pradesh; India; 23°12′16″N 77°25′47″E

Information
- Type: Private primary and secondary school
- Motto: Latin: Gaudium in Veritate (Joy in the Truth)
- Religious affiliation: Catholicism
- Denomination: Jesuits
- Patron saint: Edmund Campion
- Established: 1965; 61 years ago
- Founder: Rev. Fr. Emmanuel Ferdinand More, S.J
- Principal: Athnas Lakra
- Grades: K-12
- Gender: Boys
- Student to teacher ratio: 56:1
- Campus size: 49 acres (20 ha)
- Campus type: Urban
- Houses: Gandhi; Ashoka; Tagore; Nehru
- Publication: The Campionite
- Affiliation: Central Board of Secondary Education
- Website: campionbhopal.com

Campion School, Bhopal is a private Catholic primary and secondary school for boys located in Bhopal, in the state of Madhya Pradesh, India. The school was founded by the Jesuits in July 1965 and is one of the oldest schools in Bhopal. Campion School is affiliated with the Central Board of Secondary Education (CBSE), and is among the best schools in the city, ranked as the best Boys Day School in Madhya Pradesh in a 2019 ranking by Education World India. Its campus is spread over 49 acres (20 ha) in the locality of Arera Colony.

== History ==
In July 1965, at the invitation of the Archbishop of Bhopal Eugene D'Souza, Fr. Emmanuel Ferdinand More, a Spanish Jesuit belonging to the Province of Mumbai, established a school which he named Campion School, in honor of St. Edmund Campion, a sixteenth-century English Jesuit, also the patron saint of the school.

The school moved from place to place to find a location with a proper school setting. It held classes first at Seva Sadan, which had no room for expansion for the increasing number of students. Therefore, Fr. More, the first principal, negotiated with the government for leasing a larger piece of land, about a 10-acre (4.0 ha) patch, near No.10 bus stop. He built the school in a "barracks" fashion and extended the classes from Std IV to Std XI. It opened 17 July 1967. These buildings, "Old Campion", were returned to the government in 1974.

On 21 February 1969 Fr. More acquired 48.54 acres (19.64 ha) in Shahapura, the present site of Campion School, in the name of Bombay Xaverian Corporation. "The Campion School Society" was registered on 1 April 1972 and construction of the building began.

Campion School was moved into an incomplete building on the present site in July 1974. In the same year classes from KGI to Std. III were added. St. Mary's School, run by the Poor Sisters of Our Lady (PSOL), Mumbai, merged with Campion and its students both boys and girls were admitted to this school. Sr. Eleanor, PSOL, was the headmistress of the primary section. The girls studied at Campion for a year or two before they were admitted into St. Joseph’s, Idgah Hills, or Carmel Convent School, BHEL.

In 1979, the Bombay Jesuit Province handed over the administration of Campion School Society to the Ranchi Province. When Madhya Pradesh became an independent Province, Ranchi handed over Campion to the Madhya Pradesh Jesuits. When the Poor Sisters of Our Lady (PSOL), who had been co-workers with the Jesuits from the year 1974, decided to have their own independent school, St Mary’s' School at Seva Sadan, the M.P. Jesuits invited the Sisters of the Mercy of the Holy Cross to work with them in the primary school, which they have done since 1982.

In 1994 the school changed from the M.P. Board of Secondary Education to the Central Board of Secondary Education (CBSE). In 2017 Campion was listed among the top ten CBSE schools in Bhopal.

Fr. Alphonse Tirkey, S.J., as principal started a Hindi-medium section of the school in July 1993, for those who find instruction difficult through English.

== Facilities ==
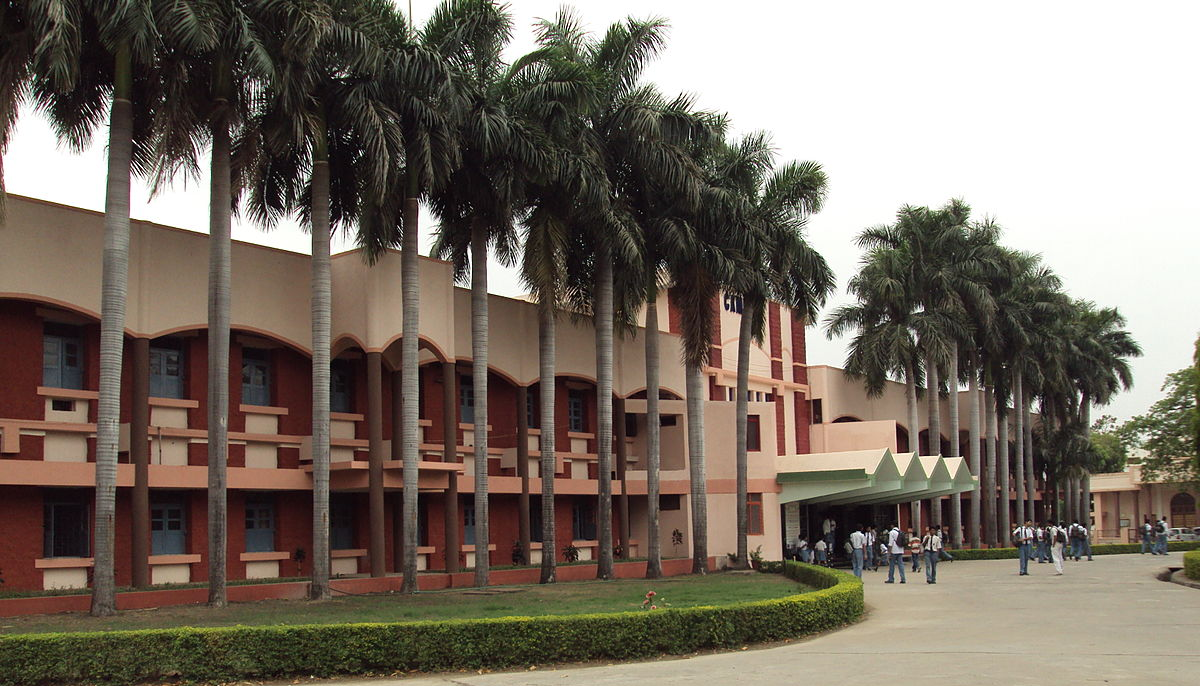
Front view of secondary section.

The school is housed in two separate buildings. The primary or elementary section runs from Pre-K (KG-1) to grade V. The secondary or high school section runs from grade VI to XII. Upgrades and renovations were done in the primary section in 1994 to accommodate more classes and facilities.

The campus is interspersed with lawns and tree-lined playgrounds, and many trees and shrubs are planted throughout the campus.

The school has an auditorium located in the primary section (which is one of the biggest in the state) and a canteen in the secondary section. Sports facilities include a games room housing sports and other equipment, four basketball courts, one soccer field. Students are also coached in roller skating and have won gold medals in the sport. The school organizes an Annual Sports Meet, in which all 4 houses compete.

In addition to computer labs in both sections, there are labs for physics, chemistry, biology, in the secondary section. There are libraries only in the secondary sections of the school

Annual Function, festival celebrations, and various inter-house and class-level competitions are regularly held. The school annually elects its student leaders. Anyone in 11th or 12th grade meeting the criteria to hold the respective posts can run for office. Campion also publishes its annual school magazine, The Campionite.

== Academics ==
Since 1994, Campion School has been affiliated to the Central Board of Secondary Education (CBSE). Besides the compulsory study of English (till 12th grade), Hindi (till 10th grade), General Science (10th), Mathematics (10th), Social Sciences (10th), and a number of other graded subjects like moral education and computers, students from grades 6 to 8 have to choose between Sanskrit and Urdu as a third language. All subjects are compulsory until the 10th grade, after which students have the choice between Mathematics, Biology, Commerce, or Humanities Stream.

The primary section consists of classes KG I to V and the secondary sections consists classes from VI to XII.

== Houses ==
To keep the competitive spirit alive in the students, there are four houses:

- Gandhi, color red, motto - Unity is strength
- Ashoka, color blue, motto - Never give in
- Tagore, color white/green, motto - Now or never
- Nehru, color yellow, motto - Service before self

== First marching band in Bhopal ==
At the instigation of Father More, Campion was the first school of Bhopal to have a marching band. Following More's death in 1988, the school band gradually ceased performing. It was revived and at the school's golden jubilee celebration in 2015 the 44-member band enchanted the guests. Fr. More also established the Boy Scouts and Girl Guides in the school.

== Notable alumni ==
Campion School has yielded many famous personalities like Lieutenant General Vinod G. Khandare, Military Advisor to the National Security Council Secretariat of India, Lieutenant General Bobby Mathews, Member of the Armed Forces Tribunal, Congress Leader and MP Assembly Leader of Opposition Ajay Singh, Senior Vice-President at Google Prabhakar Raghavan, Vineet Buch (All India Joint Entrance Exam (IIT-JEE)-1987 AIR -1; A venture capitalist based in San Francisco, Dr. JS Pandey, Shayaan Raza Khan, Jyotiraditya Kushwah (Advocate, Supreme court of India) - Batch 2018, Abhinav Sathe (Batch 2008) - Current Indian Men's Hockey Team Physiotherapist and several other famous personalities.

== See also ==
- List of Jesuit schools
- List of schools in Madhya Pradesh
