= Coimbatore–Jabalpur Weekly Superfast Express =

Train in India

Coimbatore - Jabalpur Weekly Superfast Express

Overview
- Service type: Superfast
- Status: Active
- Locale: Tamil Nadu, Kerala, Karnataka, Goa, Maharashtra & Madhya Pradesh
- First service: 26 October 2026; 43 days' time
- Current operator: West Central Railway (WCR)

Route
- Termini: Coimbatore Junction (CBE); Jabalpur Junction (JBP)
- Stops: 33
- Distance travelled: 2,054 km (1,276 mi)
- Average journey time: 39h 40m
- Service frequency: Weekly
- Train number: 20159 / 20160

On-board services
- Classes: General Unreserved, Sleeper Class, AC 3rd Class, AC 2nd Class, AC 1st Class
- Seating arrangements: Yes
- Sleeping arrangements: Yes
- Catering facilities: Pantry Car; On-board Catering; E-catering
- Observation facilities: Large windows
- Baggage facilities: No
- Other facilities: Below the seats

Technical
- Rolling stock: ICF coach
- Track gauge: 1,676 mm (5 ft 6 in)
- Operating speed: 56 km/h (35 mph) average including halts.

The 20159 / 20160 Coimbatore–Jabalpur Weekly Superfast Express is an Superfast Express train belonging to West Central Railway zone that runs between Coimbatore Junction and Jabalpur Junction in India.

== Schedule ==
- 20159 – 5:05 PM (Monday) [Coimbatore Junction]
- 20160 – 11:50 PM (Friday) [Jabalpur Junction]

== Routes and halts ==
The Important Halts of the train are :

- Coimbatore Junction
- Palakkad Junction
- Shoranur Junction
- Tirur
- Kozhikode
- Vadakara
- Kannur
- Kasaragod
- Mangaluru Junction
- Mulki
- Udupi
- Kundapura
- Mookambika Road Byndoor
- Kumta
- Karwar
- Madgaon Junction
- Thivim
- Kudal
- Kankavali
- Ratnagiri
- Chiplun
- Khed
- Roha
- Panvel Junction
- Nasik Road
- Bhusaval Junction
- Khandwa Junction
- Harda
- Itarsi Junction
- Pipariya
- Gadarwara
- Narsinghpur
- Jabalpur Junction

== Traction ==
As the entire route is fully electrified, it is hauled by a Itarsi Loco Shed-based WAP-7 electric locomotive from Coimbatore Junction to Jabalpur Junction and vice versa.

== Rake reversal or rake share ==
No rake reversal or rake share.

== See also ==
Trains from Coimbatore Junction :

1. Coimbatore–Bengaluru Cantonment Vande Bharat Express
2. Chennai Central–Coimbatore Shatabdi Express
3. Coimbatore–Jaipur Superfast Express
4. Kovai Express
5. Coimbatore–Nagercoil Express

Trains from Jabalpur Junction :

1. Jabalpur–Hazrat Nizamuddin Express
2. Jabalpur–Mumbai CSMT Garib Rath Express
3. Yesvantpur–Jabalpur Superfast Express
4. Jabalpur–Santragachi Humsafar Express
5. Mahakoshal Express

== Notes ==
a. Runs a day in a week with both directions.
