= Bhopal Bus Rapid Transit System =

Bhopal BRTS

Overview
- Locale: Bhopal, MP, India
- Transit type: Bus rapid transit
- Number of lines: 10
- Number of stations: 230
- Daily ridership: 1.25 lakh
- Website: MyBus Bhopal

Operation
- Operator: Bhopal Municipal Corporation
- Number of vehicles: 155

Technical
- System length: 186 kilometres (116 mi)

Bhopal BRTS was a bus rapid transit system in Bhopal, located in the state of Madhya Pradesh, India. The construction was funded by the Central Government under its flagship JnNURM. Unlike most of BRT projects in India which are designed to cater the transportation needs of suburban parts of the city, Bhopal BRTS is designed mainly to serve the Central business districts (CBDs). It was launched with a fleet of just 30 buses in 2006, after receiving JnNURM sanction, and has grown to 155 buses comprising AC and non-AC low-floor buses.

On 26 December 2023, following a meeting at the state secretariat, the Government of Madhya Pradesh led by Chief Minister Mohan Yadav made the decision to discontinue the BRTS project. The reason cited for the decision was the traffic problems arising due to the corridor. In its place, a central road divider was planned to be erected to separate the traffic between the two lanes. The process of dismantling the corridor began on 20 January 2024.

== Routes ==
=== Route Classification ===
The routes under this project have been classified into the following four categories:

- Trunk Routes:

Connect major activity centers by Bus Rapid Transit System. Farthest Activity center should be accessible within 45 minutes of journey time.

- Standard Routes:

Connect major origin & destination pairs of the city. These are replacement of Mini bus routes.

- Complimentary Routes:

These are complementary to Trunk and standard routes. Routes covering less dense Public transit demand corridors.

- Intermediate Para Transit (IPT) Routes:

These are feeder service to all above mentioned routes, mainly catering intra-zonal trips.

=== Route List ===
Type (No.)	Route	Bus Stops
Trunk route 1	Chirayu Hospital/ Bairagarh to Aakriti Eco City	50
Trunk route 2	Old Bus Stand to HEG Mandideep	34
Trunk route 3	Nehru Nagar to Patel Nagar	-
Trunk route 4	Bairagarh/ Sehore Naka to HEG Mandideep or Bangrasiya	47
Standard route 1	Bairagarh/ Sehore Naka to Bairagarh Chichli	35
Standard route 2	Nehru Nagar to Katara Hills	45
Standard route 3	Gandhi Nagar to Salaiyya/ Aakriti Eco City	58
Standard route 4	Karound Chauraha to Bairagarh Chichli	50
Standard route 5	Chirayu Hospital/ Bairagarh to Awadhpuri Khajuri Kalan	50
Standard route 6	City Depot Square to Ayodhya Nagar	48
Standard route 7	Gandhi Nagar to Patel Nagar Bypass	46
Standard route 8	Coach Factory to Bairagarh Chichli	53

=== Bus Stops ===
80 Bus Stops are being built along the 24 km long corridor. Ramp-building for most of the Stops is underway and Bhopal Municipal Corporation is likely to complete the work by June, 2013. Also, one part of corridor, which runs through Misrod to RRL may start working by 31 March 2013. A trial run was conducted earlier and minor difficulties have been sorted out. These Bus-Stops will have Display-Boards with the information of incoming Buses and siting arrangements will be made for the passengers. A 2-door system will help safe ride for the passengers, where one door will open only when the Bus arrives and another door will open only if the person carries a valid ticket. The stops are being built on PPP, where the contractor will be responsible for maintenance of the Stops and in-turn will have to right to put up advertisements and earn revenue.

== "Chalo" Android App ==
There is full featured Android App available in Play Store for the information related to Bhopal Brts by the name Chalo. Developer of the app already worked on the Windows version of the app and this is available for Windows Phone and Windows 10 devices .

== Problems ==
- The construction of the corridors is creating traffic woes at various locations.
- Commuters are found riding on the already built 'bus-only' lanes, and police fear that this situation will continue even after the project is completed.
