= Vikram Higher Secondary School =

School in Madhya Pradesh, India

Coordinates: 23.2390319°N 77.4736091°E

Vikram Higher Secondary School is a school in the Piplani suburb of Bhopal, Madhya Pradesh, India. The BHEL Vikram Higher Secondary School was established in 1967 and is managed by BHEL Shiksha Mandal, which is patronized by BHEL Bhopal. It is centrally located in Piplani in BHEL Township, Bhopal. The school functions as a primary, middle, secondary, and senior secondary school. It is spread over an area of 36481 m^{2} (9.15 acres) with built up area of 4413 m^{2}. The school has a double storied building with science laboratories, a language laboratory, and two libraries, among others. It is affiliated by India's Central Board of Secondary Education.
