= Santragachi–Rani Kamalapati Humsafar Express =

Fast express train of the Indian Railways

Santragachi - Rani Kamalapati (Habibganj) Humsafar Express

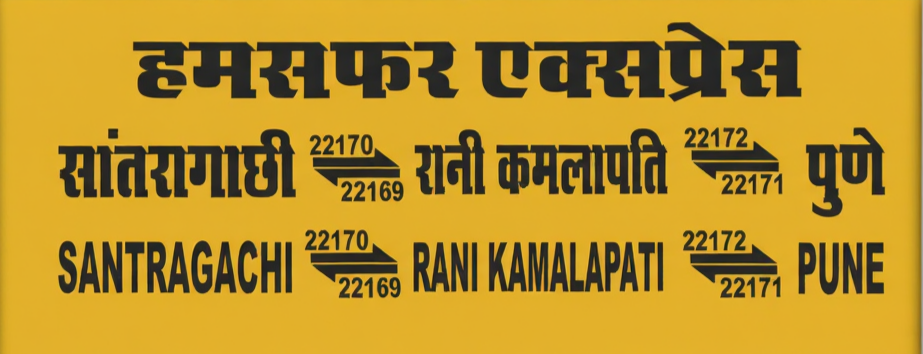
- Train board of Humsafar Express.

Overview
- Service type: Humsafar Express
- First service: 10 October 2018; 7 years ago
- Current operator: West Central Railways

Route
- Termini: Santragachi (SRC); Rani Kamalapati (RKMP)
- Stops: 13
- Distance travelled: 1,435 km (892 mi)
- Average journey time: 25 hours 15 mins
- Service frequency: Weekly (Note: Runs one days in a week for every direction.)
- Train number: 22169 / 22170

On-board services
- Classes: AC 3 tier and Non AC Sleeper
- Seating arrangements: Yes
- Sleeping arrangements: Yes
- Catering facilities: Available
- Observation facilities: Large windows

Technical
- Rolling stock: LHB Humsafar
- Track gauge: 1,676 mm (5 ft 6 in)
- Operating speed: 56 km/h (35 mph) Avg. Speed

The 22169 / 22170 Santragachi - Rani Kamalapati Humsafar Express is a superfast express train of the Indian Railways connecting Santragachi in West Bengal and Rani Kamalapati in Madhya Pradesh . It is currently being operated with 22169/22170 train numbers on a weekly basis.

== Coach composition ==
Due to non availability of sufficient AC 3-tier passenger from Santragachi station Railway recently introduce sleeper coaches along with AC 3-tier in this train. The train running with new LHB coach with new features like LED screen display to show information about stations, train speed etc. and will have announcement system as well, Vending machines for tea, coffee and milk, Bio toilets in compartments as well as CCTV cameras.

== Service ==
The 22169/Rani Kamalapati - Santragachi Humsafar Express has an average speed of 55 km/h (34 mph) and covers 1,435 km (892 mi) in 26h 05m.

The 22170/Santragachi - Rani Kamalapati Humsafar Express has an average speed of 58 km/h (36 mph) and covers 1,435 km (892 mi) in 24h 35m.

== Route and halts ==
1. Santragachi
2. Kharagpur Junction
3. Tatanagar Junction
4. Chakradharpur
5. Rourkela Junction
6. Jharsuguda Junction
7. Raigarh
8. Bilaspur Junction
9. Shahdol
10. Katni Murwara
11. Damoh
12. Saugor
13. Bina Junction
14. Vidisha
15. Rani Kamalapati

== Traction ==
This route is fully electrified and runs from end to end with Itarsi based WAP-7 locomotive.

== Rake sharing ==
The train shares its rake with 22171/22172 Pune-Rani Kamalapati Humsafar Express.

== See also ==
- Humsafar Express
- Santragachi Junction railway station
- Rani Kamalapati railway station
