= Adhartal railway station =

Railway station in Madhya Pradesh, India

Adhartal

General information
- Location: Adhartal, Jabalpur district, Madhya Pradesh; India
- Coordinates: 23°13′40″N 79°58′22″E
- Elevation: 391 metres (1,283 ft)
- System: Indian Railways station
- Owner: Indian Railways
- Operator: West Central Railway
- Line: Allahabad–Jabalpur section
- Platforms: 2
- Tracks: 4

Construction
- Structure type: Standard (on ground)
- Parking: Yes

Other information
- Status: Functioning
- Station code: ADTL
- Zone(s): West Central Railway
- Division(s): Jabalpur
Location
- Location within India Location within Madhya Pradesh

Adhartal railway station is a railway station in Jabalpur city of Madhya Pradesh. Its code is ADTL. It serves Adhartal town. The station consists of two platforms. Passenger, Express and Superfast trains halt here.

== Major trains ==
- Adhartal–Habibganj Intercity Express
- Narmada Express
