= Adesh Khamra =

Indian serial killer and robber (born c. 1970)

- Born: Adesh Khamra c. 1970; Mandideep, Raisen district, Madhya Pradesh, India
- Other names: Tailor Killer, Darzi of Death
- Occupation: Tailor
- Spouse: Sharda Khamra
- Status: Incarcerated at Bhopal Central Jail
- Convictions: Murder, robbery, criminal conspiracy
- Penalty: Life imprisonment

Details
- Victims: 34 confessed
- Span of crimes: 2007–2018
- Date apprehended: September 2018

Adesh Khamra (born c. 1970) is an Indian serial killer, highway robber, and former tailor from Mandideep, Madhya Pradesh. Following his arrest by Madhya Pradesh Police in September 2018, Khamra confessed to murdering at least 34 truck drivers and helpers during highway hijackings between 2007 and 2018. Operating predominantly along National Highway 44 and connected trunk routes, he maintained a front business as a neighborhood tailor while orchestrating armed robberies across central India.

== Early life and background ==
Adesh Khamra was born and raised in the industrial settlement of Mandideep in Raisen district, Madhya Pradesh. His father, Gulab Khamra, was a former Naib Subedar in the Indian Army. Khamra later cited severe childhood beatings and corporal punishment by his father as reasons for his psychological detachment and violent tendencies.

After leaving school upon completing class 10, Khamra moved to his maternal uncle's residence to train as a tailor. He later opened tailoring shops in Bhandara and Nagpur, though neither venture succeeded financially. He married Sharda Khamra, and the couple had five children.

== Criminal career ==
=== First murders (2007) ===
In November 2007, Khamra was recruited into highway robbery by his distant relative Sandesh Khamra, a long-distance truck driver. During their first operation, Khamra befriended a truck crew at a highway dhaba who were transporting marble from Jabalpur to Bareilly. He spiked their food with sedatives by offering sweets. Once the crew lost consciousness, Khamra strangled both the driver and the cleaner with a cotton scarf (gamcha) to avoid leaving witnesses. The victims' bodies were dumped in Chhattisgarh, while the hijacked vehicle was abandoned in Madhya Pradesh.

=== Modus operandi and escalation ===
Following the first robbery, Khamra allied with interstate networks based in Jhansi, Uttar Pradesh, eventually collaborating with up to 12 distinct gangs across Madhya Pradesh, Maharashtra, Uttar Pradesh, Bihar, and Chhattisgarh.

His standard modus operandi involved:

- Befriending drivers and cleaners at dhabas, truck stops, and toll plazas along National Highway 44.
- Lacing meals, tea, or alcoholic drinks with heavy doses of sedatives.
- Strangling the unconscious victims with cloth or ropes to eliminate evidence and avoid noise or bloodstains.
- Stripping bodies of identifying possessions and throwing them into remote ravines, rivers, or dense forests across state borders to complicate inter-state police investigations.
- Selling stolen cargo to black-market fences and reselling or repainting the hijacked trucks.

To evade telecommunication tracking, Khamra regularly disposed of hardware and numbers, using over 50 SIM cards and 43 distinct IMEI handsets over eleven years.

=== Cover shop and temporary hiatus ===
To mask his illegal income, Khamra operated a tailoring outlet named "Z-Dex Tailors" in Mandideep, portraying himself to neighbors as an unassuming family man.

In 2014, Khamra was arrested in Amravati for a non-fatal truck heist and served a short prison term. Following his release, he attempted to abandon crime and arranged the marriage of his eldest daughter. However, in March 2016, his eldest son suffered severe injuries in a traffic accident. Facing medical debts, Khamra accepted a contract killing in Hoshangabad for ₹25,000 before fully resuming highway robbery operations.

== Investigation and arrest ==
In August 2018, a truck loaded with ₹1.5 million worth of iron rods disappeared between Mandideep and Bhopal. The driver's body was later discovered near Bilkheria, while the unloaded vehicle was abandoned elsewhere.

The investigation was spearheaded by Bhopal City Superintendent of Police (CSP) Bittu Sharma under the supervision of Superintendent of Police Rahul Kumar Lodha. A Special Investigation Team (SIT) analyzed toll plaza CCTV footage and traced purchasers of the stolen steel, leading to the arrest of seven suspects.

One accomplice, Jaykaran Prajapati, broke down during psychological interrogation and identified Khamra as the syndicate ringleader. Investigators tracked another hijacked truck carrying sugar that contained an undisclosed GPS tracker. Following a 36-hour pursuit across state lines, police tracked Khamra to the forests of Sultanpur and arrested him at gunpoint in September 2018.

== Confession and legal proceedings ==
During interrogation, Khamra admitted to orchestrating 89 truck robberies, murdering 33 truck drivers and helpers, and carrying out one contract killing, bringing his confession total to 34 victims. When asked about his motive, he asserted that he gave overworked truck crews "mukti" (salvation) from their harsh livelihoods.

In April 2023, a Bhopal sessions court convicted Khamra and three associates, sentencing them to rigorous life imprisonment for a 2018 murder and robbery. During his incarceration in Bhopal Central Jail, prison authorities noted that Khamra turned to reading spiritual literature. His case has also attracted interest from filmmakers exploring screen adaptations.
