= Indus town =

Indus Town is a neighbourhood of Bhopal, India. It lies on Narmadapuram Road, 14 km from Rani Kamalapati railway station, near Ratanpur village.
