= BHEL Township, Bhopal =

BHEL township
- neighbourhood
- Location in Bhopal
- Coordinates: 23.240064°N 77.464461°E
- Country: India
- State: Madhya Pradesh
- District: Bhopal
- Metro: Bhopal

Languages
  - Official: Hindi
- Time zone: UTC+5:30 (IST)
- PIN: 462022
- Lok Sabha constituency: Bhopal
- Vidhan Sabha constituency: Piplani
- Website: www.bhelbhopal.com

BHEL TOWN, Bhopal is a suburb of Bhopal, Madhya Pradesh. This has developed like other BHEL townships after Indian public sector engineering company BHEL started its operations here. It is spread over an area of around 20 km^{2} and provides facilities like, parks, community halls, library, shopping centers, banks, post offices etc. Besides, free health services is extended to all the employees through 350 bedded (inclusive of 50 floating beds) Kasturba Hospital and chain of dispensaries.

== Transport ==
Nearest train station to BHEL township at a distance of 5 km is Habibganj, though the central Bhopal railway station is just 2 km ahead.

== Educational institutions ==
BHEL Township has many good schools and colleges such as Jawaharlal Nehru School, St. Xavier's School, Raman School, Vikram School, Radhakrishnan School, Carmel Convent School, many of them being run by the plant funded BHEL Shiksha Mandal.
