= Blue Line (Bhoj Metro) =

Mass transit system in Madhya Pradesh, India

Overview
- Other name: Bhopal Metro
- Status: Approved
- Owner: Government of India Government of Madhya Pradesh
- Locale: Bhopal, Madhya Pradesh, India
- Termini: Bhadbhada Chouraha; Ratnagiri Chouraha
- Stations: 13 (Approved)
- Color on map: Blue

Service
- Type: Rapid transit
- System: Bhoj Metro
- Operator: Madhya Pradesh Metro Rail Corporation Limited
- Rolling stock: Alstom

Technical
- Line length: 13 km (8.1 mi) (Approved)
- Track length: 13 (Approved)
- Number of tracks: 2
- Character: Elevated
- Track gauge: 1,435 mm (4 ft 8 1/2 in) standard gauge
- Electrification: 750 V DC third rail
- Operating speed: 84 km/h (52 mph) (Top); 32 km/h (20 mph) (average)

The Blue Line (Hindi: ब्लू लाइन) is an under-construction metro rail line of the Bhoj Metro, a rapid transit system in Bhopal, Madhya Pradesh, India. This line consists of 13 metro stations from Bhadbhada Chauraha to Ratnagiri Tiraha with a total distance of 12.915 km. Bhopal's Blue Line was earlier designated as the Red Line. Its Bogda Pul Station (interchange with Orange Line) will be built as part of Package BH-03.

== Stations ==
Following is a list of stations on this route:

Blue Line
#	Station Name		Opening	Connections	Layout
#	English	Hindi	Opening	Connections	Layout
1	Bhadbhada Chauraha	भदभदा चौराहा	Approved	None	Elevated
2	Depot Chauraha	डिपो चौराहा	Approved	None	Elevated
3	Jawahar Chowk	जवाहर चौक	Approved	None	Elevated
4	Roshanpura Chauraha	रोशनपुरा चौराहा	Approved	None	Elevated
5	Minto Hall	मिंटो हॉल	Approved	None	Elevated
6	Lilly Talkies	लिल्ली टॉकीज़	Approved	None	Elevated
7	Pul Bogda	पुल बोग्दा	Approved	Orange Line (under-condtruction)	Elevated
8	Prabhat Chauraha	प्रभात चौराहा	Approved	None	Elevated
9	Govindpura	गोविंदपुरा	Approved	None	Elevated
10	JK Road	जेके रोड	Approved	None	Elevated
11	Indrapuri	इंद्रपुरी	Approved	None	Elevated
12	Piplani (BHEL Township)	पिपलानी (भेल टाउनशिप)	Approved	None	Elevated
13	Ratnagiri Chouraha	रत्नागिरी चौराहा	Approved	None	Elevated
