= Gadarwara railway station =

Railway station in Madhya Pradesh, India

Gadarwara

General information
- Location: Gadarwara, Narsinghpur district, Madhya Pradesh; India
- Coordinates: 22°54′01″N 78°47′34″E
- Elevation: 353 metres (1,158 ft)
- System: Indian Railways station
- Owner: Indian Railways
- Operator: West Central Railway
- Line: Jabalpur–Bhusaval section
- Platforms: 2
- Tracks: 4

Construction
- Structure type: Standard (on ground)
- Parking: Yes
- Cycle facilities: No

Other information
- Status: Functioning
- Station code: GAR
- Zone(s): West Central Railway
- Division(s): Jabalpur

History
- Opened: 1871
Location
- Location within India Location within Madhya Pradesh

Gadarwara railway station is a 'B' Category railway station under West Central Railways serving Gadarwara town, in Narsinghpur district of Madhya Pradesh state of India. It is under Jabalpur railway division of West Central Railway Zone of Indian Railways.

Gadarwara is connected by Indian Railways, with the facility of daily running trains for New Delhi, Mumbai, Kolkata, Bhopal, Indore, Ratlam, Jabalpur, Itarsi, Gwalior, Allahabad, Varanasi, Patna, Goa, Coimbatore, Agartala, Chennai Atari, Amritsar, Kevadia, Saharsa, Gaya Junction, Erode, Jogbani and several other places in India. The nearest junction is Itarsi (117 km), and another nearby junction is Jabalpur (129 km).

The Jabalpur Airport is located at a distance of 140 km (87 mi).

== Major trains ==
- Rani Kamalapati–Agartala Weekly Express
- Coimbatore–Jabalpur Weekly Superfast Express
- Rani Kamalapati–Jabalpur Jan Shatabdi Express
- Vindhyachal Express
- Narmada Express
- Erode–Jogbani Amrit Bharat Express
- Jabalpur–H.Nizamuddin Express
- Jabalpur-Mumbai CSMT Garib Rath Express
- Mumbai CSMT–Rewa Weekly Superfast Express
- Jabalpur–Indore Overnight Express
- Amarkantak Express
- Somnath–Jabalpur Express (via Itarsi)
- Ekta Nagar–Rewa Mahamana Express
- Amravati–Jabalpur Superfast Express
- Kolkata Mail 12321/22
- Adhartal–Rani Kamalapati Intercity Express
- Kashi Express 15017/18
- Patna Jn.–Lokmanya Tilak Terminus Janta Express

== Development ==
Gadarwara Railway Station will be developed under Amrit Bharat Scheme, with improved passenger facilities like a 153 sqm waiting hall and upgraded toilet blocks and also platform upgrades.
