= Misrod =

- suburb
- Location in the area surrounding the Bhopal city
- Coordinates: 23°9′39″N 77°28′6″E
- Country: India
- State: Madhya Pradesh
- District: Bhopal
- Time zone: UTC+5:30 (IST)
- Pincode: 461116
- Telephone: +91755
- Vehicle registration: MP-04

Misrod is a suburb of south-eastern region of Bhopal, Madhya Pradesh, India. It is located in Narmadapuram Road at NH-46 from Bhopal to Nagpur. Misrod has many residential areas like Aakriti Eco City near Arera Colony, Chinar Fortune City, Golden City, Bhairopur and 11 Mile Apartment near Mandideep.

== Origination ==
Misrod name have been originated from the name of Nawab Misr-Un-Uddin Shah. The area had been known as 'Qutubyana' but after the defeat of Nawab of West Bhopal by Misr-Un-Uddin the area was conquered and renamed as 'Misrunuddinyana', which was renamed again after the war of independence as 'Misrod'

== Places of interest ==
1. Misruddin Mehal
2. Raj Kothi
3. Bhopal Palace
4. Bhoj Lake
5. Misrod International Avenue
6. Yasoda Parisar
7. Capital Mall
8. Aashima Mall

== Transport ==
=== Railways ===
As Bhopal Misrod is well developed area of South Bhopal. It is connected with railways, roadways and airways.

=== Roadways ===
The direct buses from Itarsi, Narmadapuram for Bhopal Central City connects Misrod with Bhopal Cities several regions such as Bairagarh, VIP Road, Barkheda, Indrapuri, T.T. Nagar, M.P. Nagar, Bawadiya Kalan, Arera Colony, Kolar Road, Inayatpur, Kerwa Dam, Bhadbhada, Kaliyasot Dam, DB City Mall, Shyamla Hills, Hamidiya Road, Arera Hills, Rani Kamalapati, Saket Nagar, AIIMS, Govindpura, Ayodhya Bypass and Berasia Road.

=== Airways ===
Nearest airport is Bhopal Raja Bhoj Airport, which is located near Bairagarh and Ayodhya Bypass

== See also ==
- Bhopal Express
- Bhopal Shatabadi
- Rani Kamalapati
- Mandideep
- Arera Colony
- DB City Mall
