= Rani Kamalapati–Jabalpur Jan Shatabdi Express =

Jan Shatabdi Express train in India

Rani Kamalapati – Jabalpur Jan Shatabdi Express
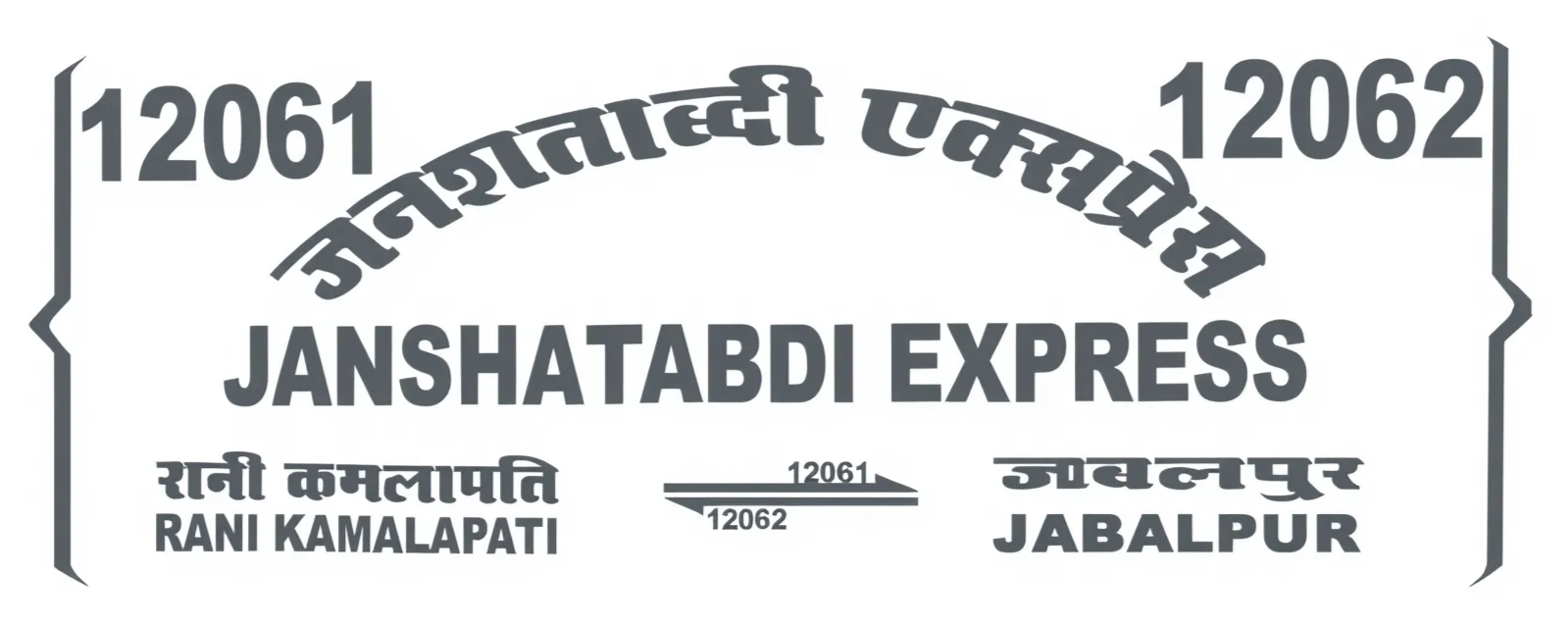

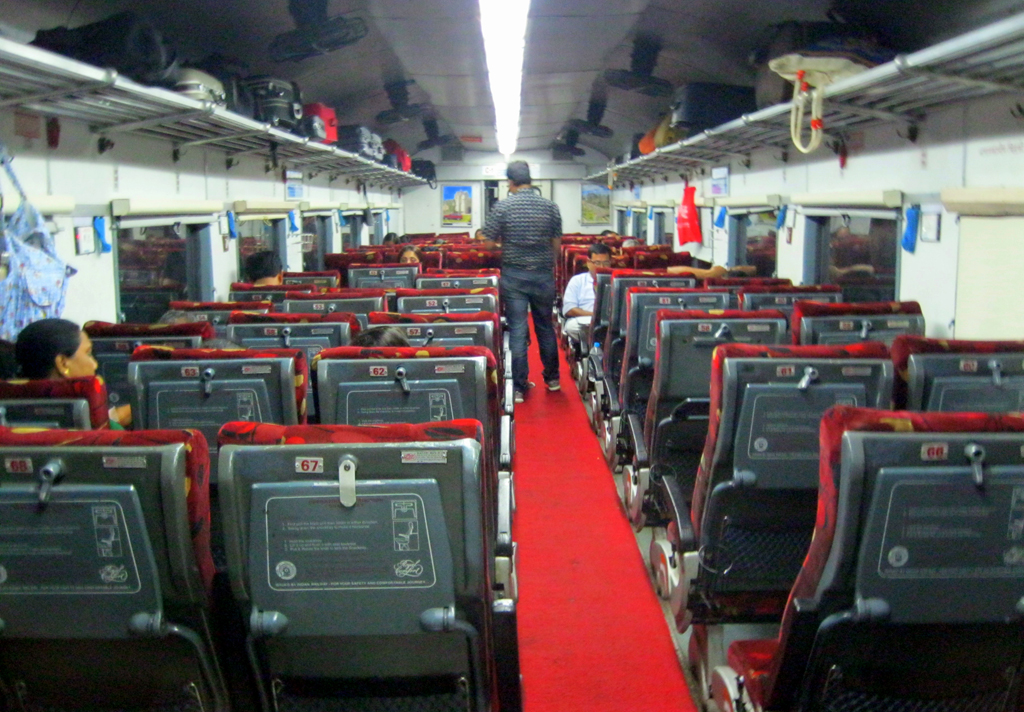
- Inside Rani Kamalapati - Jabalpur Jan Shatabdi Express

Overview
- Service type: Jan Shatabdi Express
- Locale: Madhya Pradesh
- First service: 14 December 2002; 23 years ago
- Current operator: West Central Railways (WCR)

Route
- Termini: Rani Kamalapati (RKMP); Jabalpur Junction (JBP)
- Stops: 8
- Distance travelled: 331 km (206 mi)
- Average journey time: 5 hrs 15 mins approx
- Service frequency: Daily service
- Train number: 12061/12062

On-board services
- Classes: AC Chair Car, Non AC 2nd Sitting
- Seating arrangements: Yes
- Sleeping arrangements: No
- Auto-rack arrangements: No
- Catering facilities: Yes
- Baggage facilities: Yes

Technical
- Rolling stock: LHB coach
- Track gauge: 1,676 mm (5 ft 6 in) broad gauge
- Operating speed: 63 km/h (39 mph) average with halts
Route map
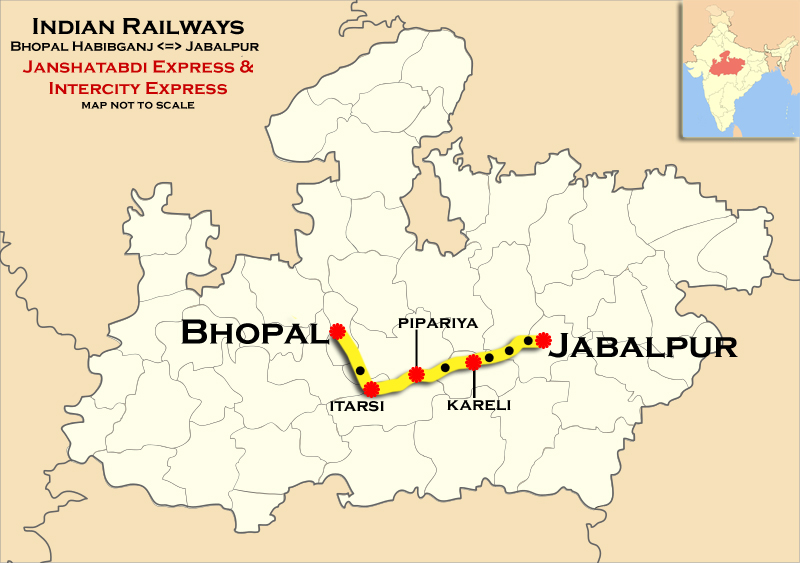
↓ 12061 • 12062 ↑

The 12061 / 12062 Rani Kamalapati–Jabalpur Jan Shatabdi Express is a type of Jan Shatabdi Express train service offered by West Central Railway.

== Service ==
The train runs between Rani Kamalapati, the suburban railway station in Bhopal, the capital city of Madhya Pradesh and Jabalpur Junction of Jabalpur, one of the major city of Madhya Pradesh.

== Route & halts ==
- Rani Kamalapati
- Narmadapuram
- Itarsi Junction
- Pipariya
- Gadarwara
- Kareli
- Narsinghpur
- Shridham
- Madan Mahal
- Jabalpur Junction

== Locomotive ==
The train is hauled by Itarsi-based WAP-7 or by Ghaziabad-based WAP-5 locomotive from Rani Kamalapati to Itarsi Junction handing over to a Itarsi-based WAP-7 locomotive to Jabalpur Junction after rake-reversal.

== Coach composition ==
The train consists of 21 coaches viz., 4 AC Chair Car, 14 Second Sitting Chair Car, 1 EOG (power car), 1 SLR and 1 EV (Vistadome).

== E-catering ==
- E-catering available at:- Rani Kamalapati (RKMP), Itarsi (ET), Jabalpur Junction (JBP).
