= Orange Line (Bhoj Metro) =

Mass transit system in Madhya Pradesh, India

Overview
- Status: Partially Operational
- Locale: Bhopal, Madhya Pradesh, India
- Termini: Shubhash Nagar (further extended to Karond Chauraha); AIIMS
- Stations: 16; 8 (Operational)

Service
- Type: Rapid transit
- System: Bhoj Metro
- Operator: Madhya Pradesh Metro Rail Corporation Limited
- Rolling stock: Alstom

History
- Opened: 21 December 2025; 6 months ago

Technical
- Line length: 14.99 km (9.31 mi) (Planned); 6.22 km (3.86 mi) (Operational); 8.77 km (5.45 mi) (Approved)
- Character: Elevated & Underground
- Track gauge: 1,435 mm (4 ft 8 1/2 in) standard gauge
- Electrification: 750 V DC third rail
- Operating speed: 90 km/h (56 mph) (Top); 32 km/h (20 mph) (average)

The Orange Line is a partially operational metro rail line of the Bhoj Metro, a rapid transit system in Bhopal, Madhya Pradesh, India. This line consists of 16 metro stations from Karond Chauraha to AIIMS with a total distance of 14.99 km (9.31 mi). The priority section from Subhash Nagar to AIIMS was under-construction with a distance of 6.22 km (3.86 mi) and was expected to be operational of 21 December 2025, but is delayed at the moment.

== List of stations ==
Following is a list of stations on this route:

Orange Line
#	Station Name		Opening	Connections	Layout
#	English	Hindi	Opening	Connections	Layout
1	Karond Chauraha	करोंद चौराहा	TBC	None	Elevated
2	Krishi Upaj Mandi	कृषि उपज मंडी	TBC	None	Elevated
3	DIG Bungalow	डी आइ जी बंगला	TBC	None	Elevated
4	Sindhi Colony	सिंधी कॉलोनी	TBC	None	Elevated
5	Nadra Bus Stand	नादरा बस स्टैंड	TBC	Nadra ISBT	Underground
6	Bhopal Railway Station	भोपाल रेलवे स्टेशन	TBC	Bhopal Junction	Underground
7	Aishbagh	ऐशबाग	TBC	None	Elevated
8	Pul Bogda	पुल बोगदा	TBC	Blue Line (Planned)	Elevated
9	Subhash Nagar	सुभाष नगर	21 December 2025	None	Elevated
10	Kendriya Vidyalaya	केन्द्रीय विद्यालय	21 December 2025	None	Elevated
11	Board Office Chauraha	बोर्ड ऑफिस चौराहा	21 December 2025	None	Elevated
12	MP Nagar	एमपी नगर	21 December 2025	None	Elevated
13	Rani Kamalapati Railway Station	रानी कमलापति रेलवे स्टेशन	21 December 2025	Rani Kamalapati	Elevated
14	DRM Office	डीआरएम ऑफिस	21 December 2025	None	Elevated
15	Alkapuri	अलकापुरी	21 December 2025	None	Elevated
16	AIIMS	एम्स	21 December 2025	None	Elevated

== See also ==
- Bhopal
- List of rapid transit systems in India
- List of metro systems
