= Adhartal–Rani Kamalapati Intercity Express =

Train in India

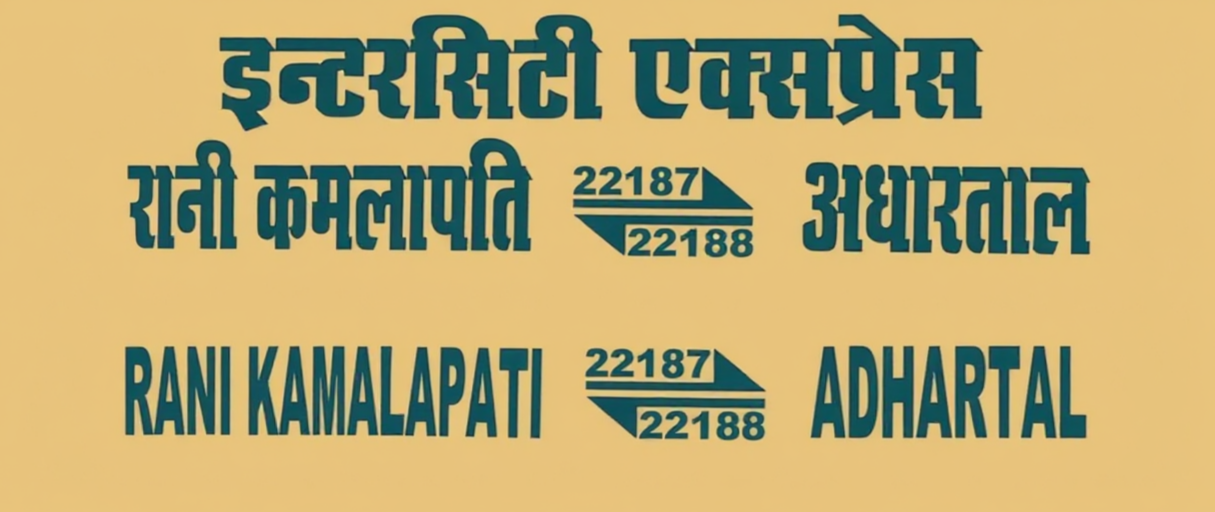

Overview
- Service type: Express
- Current operator: West Central Railway

Route
- Termini: Adhartal (ADTL); Rani Kamalapati (RKMP)
- Stops: 10
- Distance travelled: 339 km (211 mi)
- Average journey time: 5h 45m
- Service frequency: Daily (Note: Runs seven days in a week for every direction.)
- Train number: 22187/22188

On-board services
- Classes: CC, 3A, 2S, UR/GEN
- Seating arrangements: Yes
- Sleeping arrangements: Yes
- Catering facilities: E-Catering
- Entertainment facilities: No
- Baggage facilities: No

Technical
- Rolling stock: LHB coach
- Track gauge: 1,676 mm (5 ft 6 in)
- Operating speed: 130 km/h (81 mph), including halts
Route map
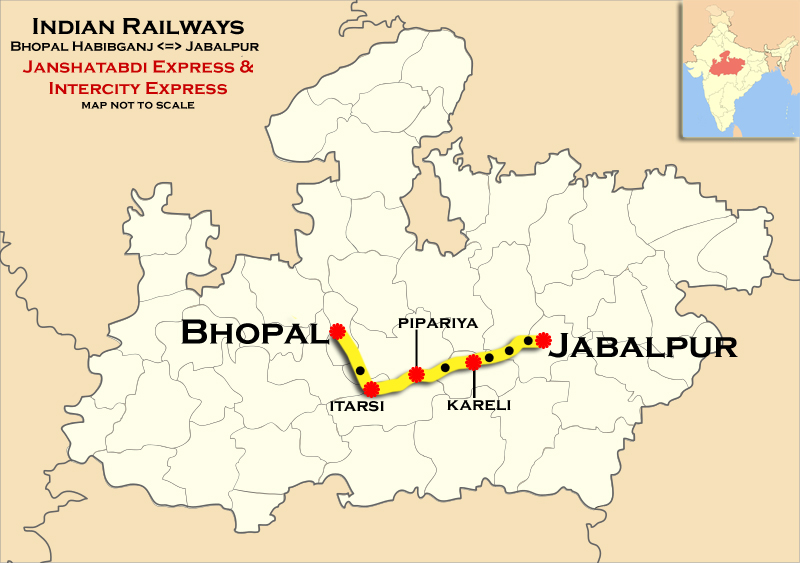

Adhartal - Rani Kamalapati Intercity Express is a daily Express Train of the Indian Railways, which runs between Adhartal railway station of Jabalpur, one of the important city & military cantonment hubs of Central Indian state of Madhya Pradesh and Rani Kamalapati the railway station in Bhopal, the capital city of Madhya Pradesh.

== Number and nomenclature ==
The number allowted for the train is :

- 22187 - From Bhopal to Jabalpur
- 22188 - From Jabalpur to Bhopal

Till Nov 2019, It was run as Jabalpur Habibganj Intercity Express with numbered (15259/15260) and after that, it was extended to Adhartal and renamed as Adhartal Habibganj (now Rani Kamalapati) Intercity Express.

== Arrival and departure ==
Train no. 22187 departs from Rani Kamalapati daily at 05:15 Hrs, reaching Adhartal, by forenoon at 11:00. Train no. 22188 departs from Adhartal daily at 16:15 Hrs reaching Rani Kamalapati, the same evening by 22:23.

== Routes and halts ==
The train goes via Itarsi Junction. The important halt of the train are :

- Rani Kamalapati
- Narmadapuram
- Itarsi Junction
- Pipariya
- Gadarwara
- Kareli
- Narsinghpur
- Sri Dham
- Jabalpur Madan Mahal
- Jabalpur Junction

== Locomotive ==
The train is hauled by a WAG-9 or a WAP-7 electric locomotive of the Itarsi Shed.

== Coach composition ==
The train consists of 21 coaches as follows:

- 2 AC CHAIR CAR
- 2 AC THREE TIER SLEEPER
- 9 SECOND SITTING CHAIR CAR
- 6 UNRESERVED GENERAL SECOND CLASS
- 1 SLR
- 1 EOG POWER CAR

== Rake sharing ==
The train was made to run with LHB coaches from 16 February 2026 and shared its rake with the 22163/22164 Bhopal-Khajuraho Mahamana Express.
