= BHEL township =

BHEL Townships being located at various locations may refer to:

- BHEL Township, Bhopal
- BHEL Township, Hyderabad
- BHEL Jhansi, BHEL township
- Ramachandrapuram (BHEL Township)
- BHEL, Ranipur (Ranipur, Uttarakhand)
