= Misrod railway station =

Railway station in Madhya Pradesh

Misrod

General information
- Location: Misrod, Bhopal district, Madhya Pradesh; India
- Coordinates: 23.168297°N 77.458448°E
- Elevation: 468 metres (1,535 ft)
- System: Indian Railways station
- Owner: Indian Railways
- Operator: West Central Railways
- Line: Bhopal–Nagpur section
- Platforms: 3
- Tracks: 4
- Connections: Auto stand

Construction
- Structure type: Standard (on-ground station)
- Parking: Yes
- Accessible: Available

Other information
- Status: Functioning
- Station code: MSO
- Zone(s): West Central Railway zone
- Division(s): Bhopal
Location
- Location within Bhopal Location within Madhya Pradesh Location within India

Misrod railway station (station code:- MSO) is a suburban railway station of Bhopal, Madhya Pradesh. Its code is MSO. It serves Misrod area of the Bhopal city. The station consists of 3 platforms. The platform is well sheltered. It has many facilities including water and sanitation.

== Major trains ==
- Panchvalley Fast Passenger
- Itarsi–Jhansi Passenger
