= BHEL Township, Hyderabad =

BHEL Township, Ramachandrapuram, Hyderabad BHEL Lingampally
- Planned Township
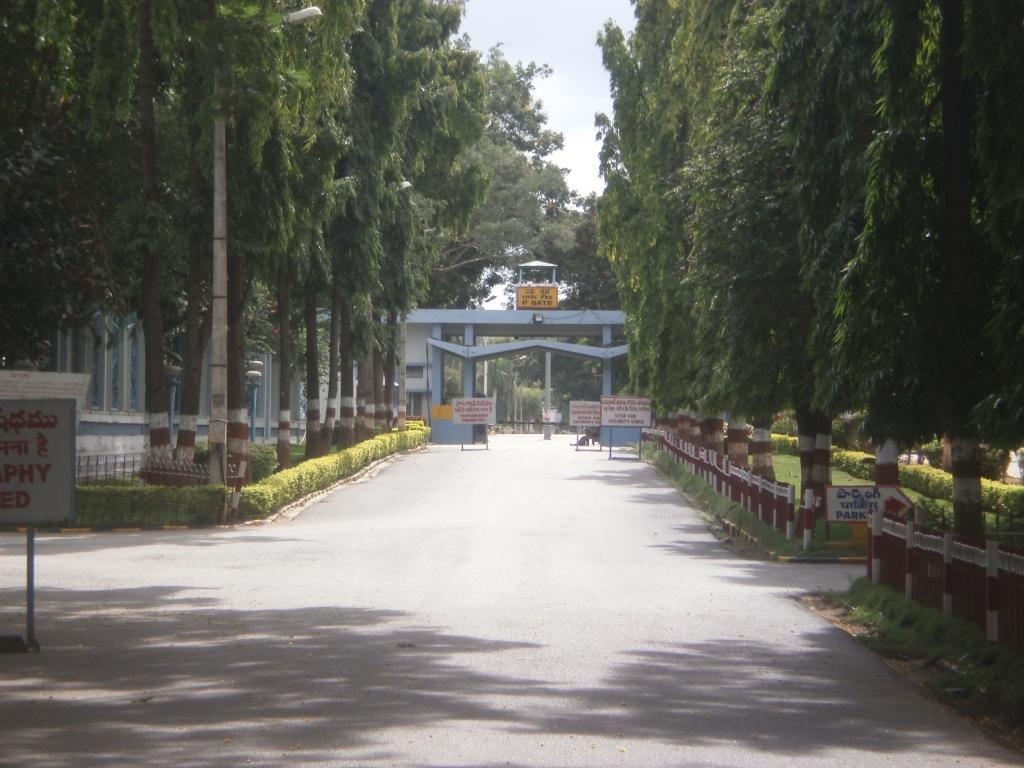
- BHEL Hyderabad Factory

- BHEL Township, Hyderabad BHEL Township, Ramachandrapuram, Hyderabad (Telangana) BHEL Township, Ramachandrapuram, Hyderabad (India)
- Coordinates: 17.495438°N 78.296017°E
- Country: India
- State: Telangana
- District: Sangareddy
- Metro: Hyderabad

Government
  - Body: GHMC

Languages
  - Official: Telugu
- Time zone: UTC+5:30 (IST)
- PIN: 502 032
- Lok Sabha constituency: Medak Lok Sabha constituency
- Vidhan Sabha constituency: Serilingampally Assembly constituency
- Planning agency: GHMC

BHEL Township in Ramchandrapuram is a suburb of Hyderabad, Telangana. Like other BHEL townships, it was originally developed to house employees and families of the Indian public sector engineering company BHEL. The township is now well known for its greenery, wide roads, and peaceful atmosphere.

Hostels for ET's, Assistant Engineers and artisans are available here. It is spread over an area of around 16 km^{2} and provides facilities like, parks, community halls, sports complex, grounds, library, shopping centers, banks, and post offices. Free health services are extended to all the employees and their dependents through BHEL run hospital.

== Commercial area ==
A small market complex known as Kirthimahal comprising small groceries, a pharmacy and small eateries, provides for basic necessities of BHEL employees. Beside this, a weekly market for vegetables and fresh fruits [Wednesday market] is organised by the company in its township. State Bank of Hyderabad (now State Bank of India) is operating a branch and APGV Bank has a branch inside the township. There are ATMs of other banks like AXIS and HDFC nearby the BHEL township but not inside. Brindavan Gas Agency supplies Indane LPG.

== Amenities ==
There are many parks, sports complex and grounds in this area which are accessible to employees and a large number of outsiders. Also there is a community center, gym, swimming pool, stadium, tennis, badminton, basketball and volleyball courts and the most prominent BHEL General Hospital for BHEL employees and their families. Most of the sport facilities are available. Overall it provides many facilities to its resident employees and their families.

== Transport ==
BHEL Hyderabad Township is connected through road, railways and air to the rest of India.

Nearest local train station to BHEL township is Lingampally, which is 3 km away from the township. Two main railway stations Hyderabad Deccan railway station and Secunderabad Junction railway station are nearly 26 km away which connects it from rest of India. Also new MMTS railway station is coming up in BHEL with the name "BHEL Halt" that will server passengers MMTS trains.

Nearest Airport is Rajiv Gandhi International Airport, which is about 40 km away from the main gate of the township.

National Highway 9 (old numbering) passes around township boundary. The state-owned Telangana State Road Transport Corporation runs the city bus service, connecting to all the major centres of the city. The nearest bus stand to reach main BHEL check post is Lingampally. The nearest Hyderabad Metro Rail station is also at Miyapur, which is 7 km away from main gate of township

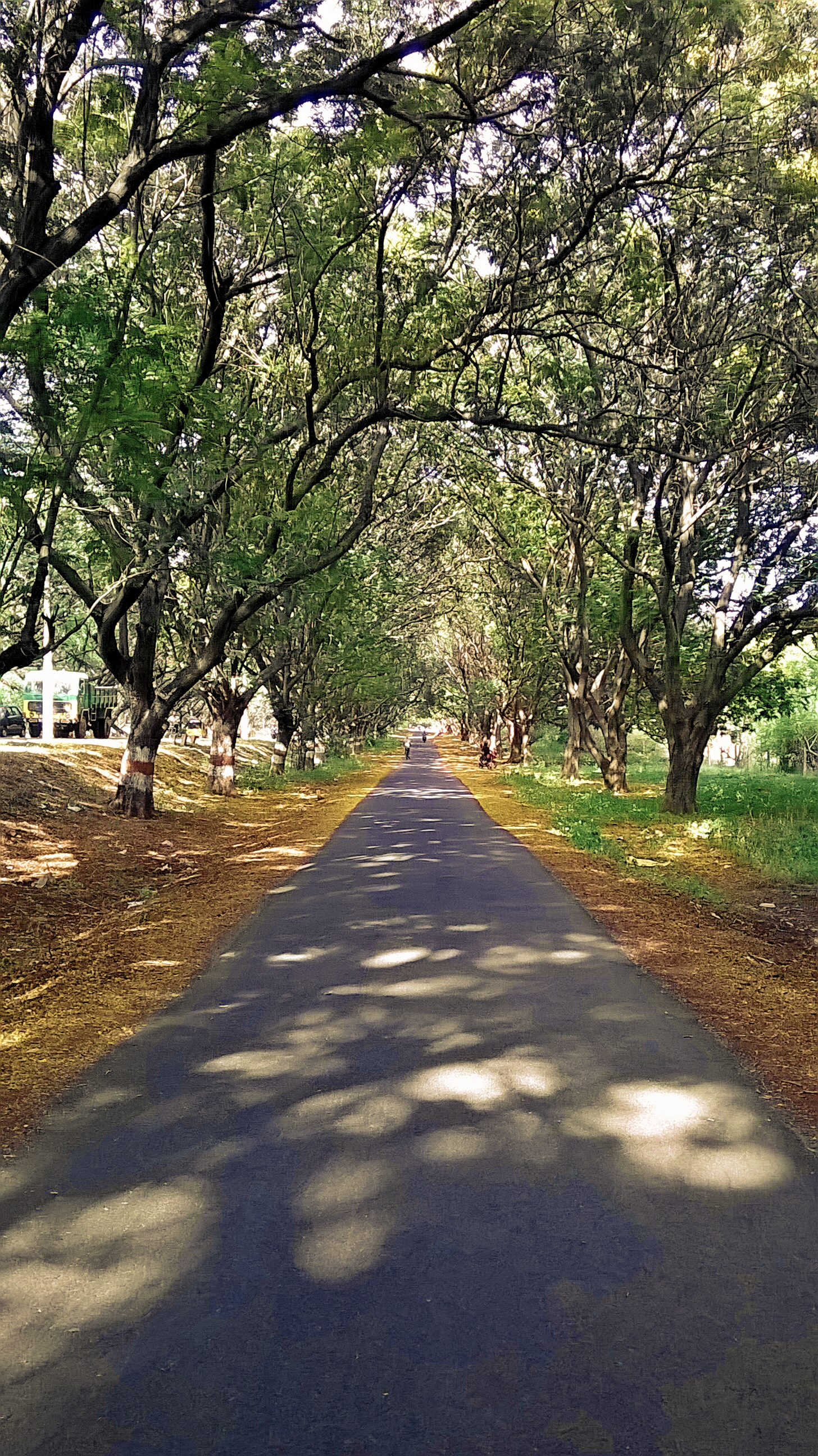
BHEL Side Road in Autumn

For inside township transportation, auto-rickshaws are available from 5am to 9pm.

== Educational institutions ==
BHEL Township has many schools such as St Ann's, Bharatiya Vidya Bhavan Public School, Jyothi Vidyalaya, Vidya Bharati High School, Geetanjali School. The BVB Public School has CBSE affiliation. Science library is also available in BHEL Township which has over 10,000 books and magazines for various professional and competitive exams.
