= Bhoj Metro =

Rapid transit system serving Bhopal, India

Bhopal Metro
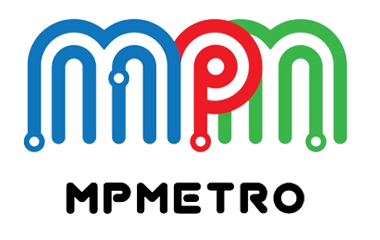
- MPMRCL Logo

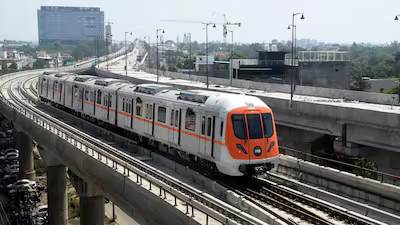

Overview
- Owner: Madhya Pradesh Metro Rail Corporation Limited
- Locale: Bhopal, Madhya Pradesh, India
- Transit type: Rapid Transit
- Number of lines: 2
- Line number: Partially Operational: Orange Line; Under construction : Blue Line
- Number of stations: 8 (Operational); 29 (Planned); 21 (Under construction)
- Website: MPMRCL

Operation
- Began operation: December 21, 2025; 10 months ago
- Character: Elevated & Underground
- Train length: 3 coaches

Technical
- System length: 6.22 km (3.86 mi) (Operational); 87.90 km (54.62 mi) (Planned); 21.68 km (13.47 mi) (Under construction)
- Track gauge: 1,435 mm (4 ft 8 1/2 in) standard gauge
- Electrification: 750 V DC third rail
- Average speed: 44 km/h
- Top speed: 90 km/h
System map
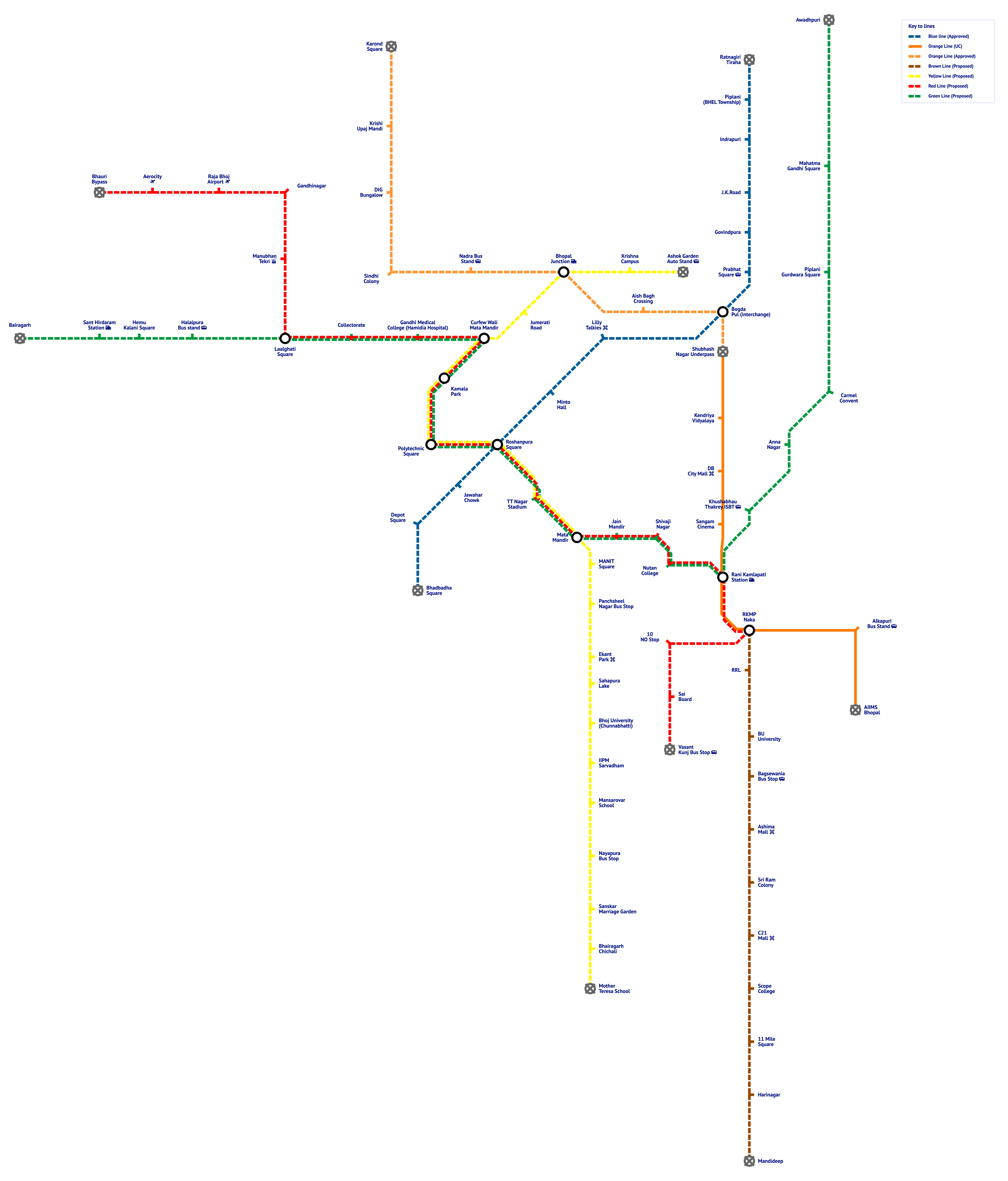
Entire map of Bhoj Metro System (Bhopal) includes 107KM : under construction lines | Approved lines | Proposed lines

The Bhoj Metro (also known as the Bhopal Metro) is a rapid transit system that serves the city of Bhopal, India, the capital of the Indian state of Madhya Pradesh. The total system consists of 6 corridors covering a distance of 104.87 kilometres (65.16 mi). The first phase of the Bhopal Metro project consists of 28 km (17.40 mi) of Line 2 & 5 being under construction. This project will cost ₹80 billion (US$850 million) approximately. There will be three types of run – at-grade, elevated, and underground in some sections. The priority corridor between AIIMS to Subhash Nagar was inaugurated on 21 December 2025.

== Background ==
The planned Metro in Bhopal is a metro rail system. This system consists of a Network of 105 km (65.24 mi) and with lines overlapping and branching. In May 2013. Ar. Rohit Gupta (Rohit Associates Cities & Rails Pvt.Ltd) consultants were appointed to prepare a detailed project report for the MRTS including the selection of the system for the city. Based on the multicriteria analysis and recommendations of consultants, the Government of Madhya Pradesh approved the inception report prepared by the consultant on 30 June 2014. As of 2 December 2014 Geotechnical surveys and formation of the company is being carried on for the implementation of the project.[citation needed]. DPR was approved by State Cabinet in December 2016.[9]

On 1 May 2019, the Asian Development Bank (ADB) gave in-principle approval to fund the Bhopal Metro project. The Union Government will stand as guarantor for the loan.[10]

The planned Metro in Bhopal is a metro rail system system. This system consists of a Network of 105 km (65.24 mi) / 123.63 km (including overlapping length) and with lines overlapping and branching. In May 2013, Rohit Associates Cities and Rails Private Ltd erstwhile Rohit Associates Architects and Engineers private limited headed by Architect Rohit Gupta were appointed to prepare a detailed project report for the MRTS including the selection of the system for the city. Based on the multi criteria analysis and recommendations of consultants, the Government of Madhya Pradesh approved the inception report prepared by the consultants on 30 June 2014.The Final DPR was submitted on 1st March 2016 for operational network of 123.63km network of 3rd rail power supply and CBTC based Metro Rail to be implemented in 3 phases having 86 stations. The first phase is being implemented and is partially under operation.

On 1 May 2019, the Asian Development Bank (ADB) gave in-principle approval to fund the Bhopal Metro project. The Union Government will stand as guarantor for the loan.

The metro system is named for Raja Bhoj, an 11th century king of Malwa.

== Construction Phases ==
=== Phase 1 ===
Construction of Phase 1 began in January 2019. Chief Minister Kamal Nath laid the project's foundation stone on 26 September 2019.

==== Orange Line ====
Construction of the Orange Line initially focused on the priority section between Subhash Nagar and AIIMS. In October 2018, Dilip Buildcon was awarded a ₹247.06 crore contract for the design and construction of the 6.225-kilometre elevated viaduct, excluding stations and including the depot entry and exit structures. Construction began in January 2019, while Chief Minister Kamal Nath laid the project's foundation stone on 26 September 2019.

Construction was interrupted by the COVID-19 lockdown in 2020. Segment casting resumed in June after a suspension of more than two months. On 25 September 2020, Dilip Buildcon erected the first precast viaduct segment between piers 144 and 145 near the proposed Kendriya Vidyalaya station.

In November 2021, URC Construction was selected for the ₹426.67 crore contract to construct eight elevated stations on the priority section. The scope included the viaduct portions within the stations and the transition spans on either side.

The first Alstom-built trainset for Bhopal was delivered in August 2023, followed by a second in September. Chief Minister Shivraj Singh Chouhan flagged off a trial run from Subhash Nagar on 3 October 2023.

Construction contracts for the remaining Subhash Nagar–Karond section were awarded separately. In December 2023, URC Construction secured Package BH-03, covering approximately 5.34 kilometres of elevated viaducts and six elevated stations. The package comprised two sections on either side of the planned underground alignment.

On 5 March 2024, Chief Minister Mohan Yadav performed the foundation-stone ceremony for the 8.77-kilometre Subhash Nagar–Karond section. The section was planned with eight stations, including two underground stations along a 3.39-kilometre underground stretch, at an estimated cost of ₹1,540 crore.

In March 2024, Madhya Pradesh Metro Rail Corporation Limited awarded the approximately ₹769 crore underground construction contract, Package BH-04, to a joint venture of Kalpataru Projects International and Gulermak. The package included twin tunnels and underground stations at Bhopal Junction and Nadra Bus Stand.

The priority section between Subhash Nagar and AIIMS was inaugurated on 20 December 2025 by Union Minister Manohar Lal Khattar and Chief Minister Mohan Yadav. It comprised eight elevated stations: Subhash Nagar, Kendriya Vidyalaya, Board Office Chauraha, MP Nagar, Rani Kamlapati, DRM Office, Alkapuri and AIIMS. The inauguration marked the opening of the first operational section of the Orange Line.

==== Blue Line ====
The Blue Line's main civil works were tendered under Package BH-05, covering the elevated corridor between Bhadbhada Chauraha and Ratnagiri Tiraha. Madhya Pradesh Metro Rail Corporation Limited (MPMRCL) invited bids in June 2023. Technical bids were opened in October 2023, with seven firms participating. Following the opening of financial bids in October 2024, Afcons Infrastructure emerged as the lowest bidder among four technically qualified firms.

In December 2024, Afcons Infrastructure received the letter of acceptance for the ₹1,006.74 crore contract. The scope included part design and construction of the elevated viaduct, 13 elevated stations and access to the depot, excluding the passenger interchange station. The engineering, procurement and construction contract specified a three-year construction period. The Bogda Pul interchange station, connecting the Blue and Orange lines, was assigned to URC Construction under the Orange Line's Package BH-03. The Blue Line's depot access was planned to connect with the Subhash Nagar depot shared with the Orange Line.

Preliminary construction began in early 2025. Activities included soil investigations and the relocation of underground utilities along the alignment. By July 2025, water pipelines, sewerage networks and telecommunications infrastructure were being shifted at key intersections to prepare sites for construction, while foundation work was progressing.

By late July 2025, Afcons had begun casting precast viaduct segments at the Anna Nagar casting yard for Package BH-05.

In July 2026, Afcons announced that it had completed the first viaduct segment erection using a launching girder at Piplani Chouraha, marking a milestone in construction of the elevated corridor.

Phase 1 network
No.	Line	Stations	Length (km)	Terminals		Status	Opening date
1	Orange Line	8	8.77	Karond Chauraha	Subhash Nagar	Under Construction	
1	Orange Line	8	6.22	Subhash Nagar	AIIMS	Completed	20 December 2025
2	Blue Line	13	13	Bhadbhada Chauraha	Ratnagiri Tiraha	Under Construction	
Total		29	26.99				

== Lines ==
=== Orange Line ===
The Orange Line is planned to connect Karond Square with AIIMS. Its initial section, between Subhash Nagar and AIIMS, was inaugurated on 20 December 2025. This section comprises eight elevated stations: Subhash Nagar, Kendriya Vidyalaya, Board Office Chauraha, MP Nagar, Rani Kamlapati, DRM Office, Alkapuri and AIIMS.

=== Blue Line ===
The Blue Line is planned to connect Bhadbhada Square with Ratnagiri Tiraha. Construction was underway as of August 2026.

== Network ==
Bhopal Metro
No.	Line Name	Terminal		Stations	Length	First Operational	Last Extension
1	Orange Line	Subhash Nagar	AIIMS	16	6.22 km (3.86 mi)	20 December 2025	
Total				16	6.22 km (3.86 mi)		

== Status updates ==
- October 2018: DPR is approved by central government.
- November 2018: Tendering may start in December.
- December 2018: Detailed Geotechnical investigation study (soil testing) begins.
- January 2019: Dilip Buildcon begins construction of elevated viaduct between Shubash Nagar And AIIMS starts.
- April 2019: Dilip Buildcon begins pile testing.
- August 2019: Construction work ongoing. MPMRCL announced metro will start operations in 2023.
- September 2019: Project renamed to Bhoj Metro by Madhya Pradesh Chief Minister Kamal Nath while laying the foundation stone.
- Jun 2020: Metro construction ongoing near Subhash Nagar, AIIMS. Casting yard for girders work ongoing at Kanhasaiyan.
- Aug 2020: 80 pillars already constructed. Aim is to inaugurate the metro services before August 2023.
- Aug 2021: Bhopal Metro receives bids from 4 firms for the construction of 8 Elevated stations. More than 190 pillars constructed and 50+ girders launched. The expected operation for the priority corridor from AIIMS to Subhash Nagar (8 km) is by August 2023. However, the possibility of completion of phase-I work (Total 28 km) by 2023, seems bleak due to administrative laxity and less coordination between on-ground officials. 70% of the work of the priority corridor completed.
- September 2021: Bhopal Metro's construction work continues at very slow pace. Project outlay is expected to increase from initial estimates of Rs. 6941 crore to Rs. 9000 crore. Expected operation of metro in 2023 is very unlikely.
- October 2021: Metro construction work regains some pace. Bhopal metro construction nearing its 100th girder launching. More than 95 girders launched on Line 2 stretch between AIIMS and Subhash Nagar (6.3 Km). However, no work has started on the remaining stretch of Line 2 (Subhash Nagar to Karond) and Line 5 (Depot Square to Ratnagiri) which are proposed to be completed in Phase-I by 2023. Construction agency for Metro Depot near Jinsi is likely to be finalized in second week of November.
- November 2021: MPMRCL has invited global tenders for supply of rail and electrical system for the Bhopal Metro Project. Foundation stone for construction of eight metro stations between AIIMS and Subhash Nagar laid. Chennai based URC Construction starts on-field work for metro station. Metro in Bhopal is slated to be launched by the end of 2023. Tender also launched for supply of 81 Metro cars for Bhopal Metro. Girder launching continues between DB City and Rani Kamalapati Railway Station, the only section left for girder launching in the priority corridor between AIIMS and Subhash Nagar (6.3 km).
- March 2022: KEC International-SAM India JV has won the contract for the construction of Subhash Nagar Metro Depot. The firm is likely to commence groundwork in April 2022, the construction work of Depot involving an estimated cost of Rs. 323 crores. Segment launching near Rani Kamlapati Railway station is continuing at a very slow pace. No concrete work is yet visible for the construction of 8 metro stations in the priority corridor.
- May 2023: MPMRCL receives in-principle approval by Indian Railways to construct a railway overbridge, connecting RKMP Metro station to the Orange Line stations towards AIIMS.
- September 2023: Rolling stock for Bhopal Metro's Orange Line has been delivered by Alstom and unloaded at the Subhash Nagar Depot. The trial runs are expected to start soon, and will be carried out between the Subhash Nagar and Rani Kamlapati Railway Station metro stations.
- October 2023: 7 firms submit bids for civil contract of package BH-05 - construction of 13 stations and elevated viaduct for the Blue line.
- December 2023: L&T completes track laying on the priority corridor. Civil Contract for package BH-03 - construction of 6 elevated stations on Orange Line including an interchange station at Pul Bogda and elevated viaduct has been awarded to URCC.
- February 2024: A KPIL and Gulemark Joint Venture has been awarded the civil contract for the underground package BH-04 - twin tunnels to connect two ramps via stations at Nadra Bus Stand and Bhopal Junction.
- April 2024: Survey conducted for third line.
- December 2025: The Orange Line of the Bhopal Metro was inaugurated on 20 December 2025, launching its priority corridor. Stretching nearly 7 km, the corridor features eight elevated stations: AIIMS, Alkapuri, DRM Office, Rani Kamlapati Station, MP Nagar, Board Office Square, Kendriya Vidyalaya, and Subhash Nagar.

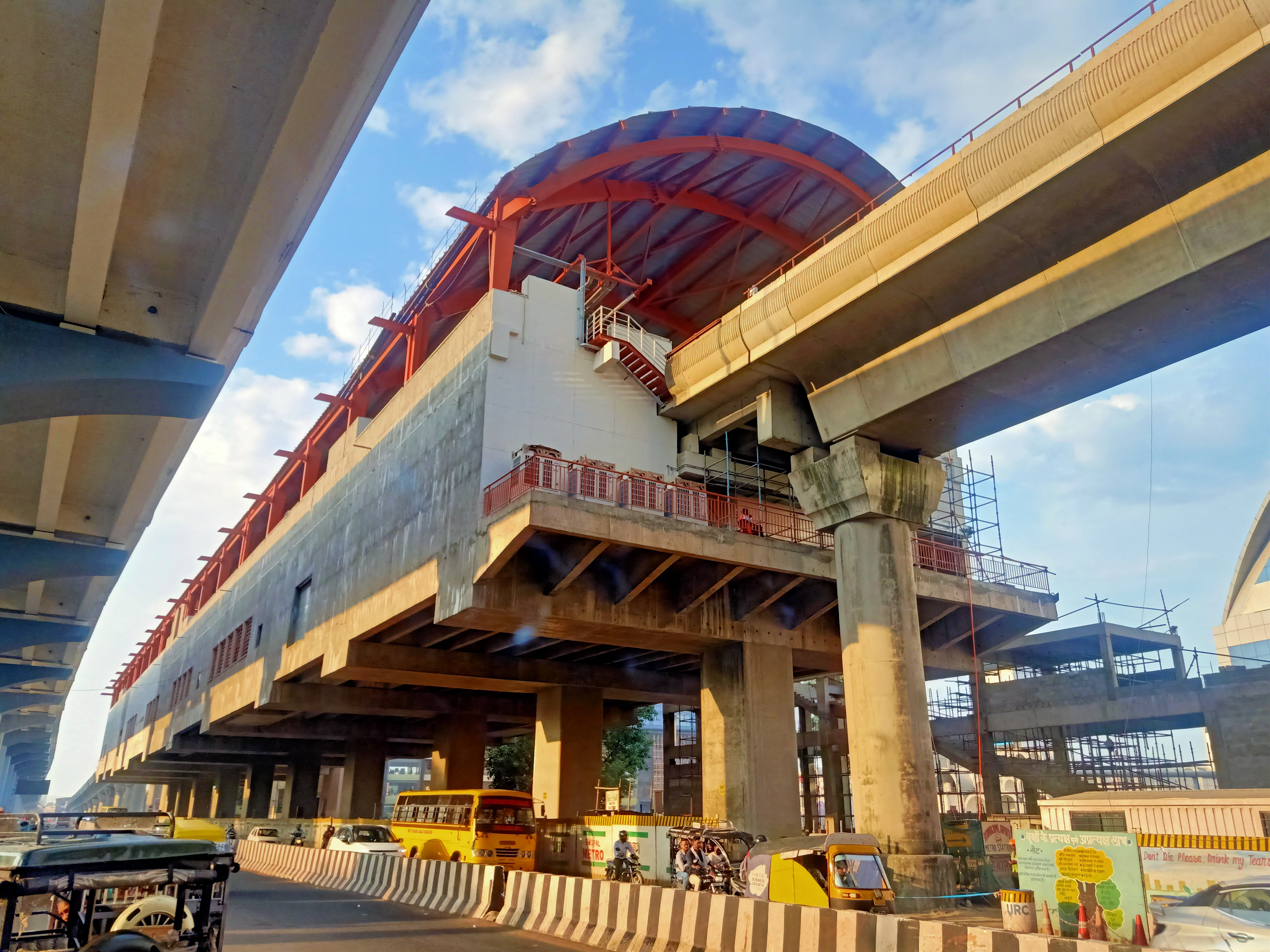
Rani Kamalapati Metro Station under construction

== See also ==
- Urban rail transit in India
  - Indore Metro
