= Jabalpur–Mumbai CSMT Garib Rath Express =

Train in India

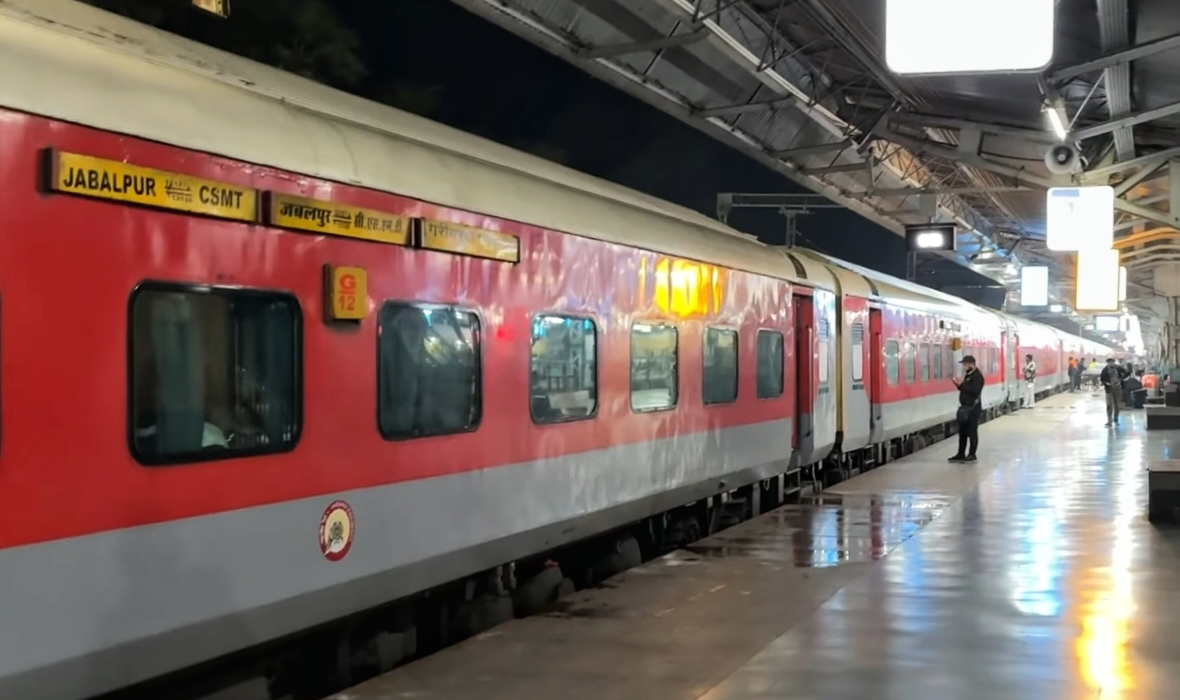
- Jabalpur–Mumbai CSMT Garib Rath Express At Itarsi Junction railway station

Overview
- Service type: Garib Rath Express
- Locale: Maharashtra & Madhya Pradesh
- First service: 20 February 2009; 17 years ago
- Current operator: West Central Railway

Route
- Termini: Jabalpur Junction (JBP); Mumbai CSMT (CSMT)
- Stops: 13
- Distance travelled: 994 km (618 mi)
- Average journey time: 16 hours 45 minutes
- Service frequency: Tri-weekly
- Train number: 12187 / 12188

On-board services
- Class: AC 3 Tier
- Seating arrangements: Yes
- Sleeping arrangements: Yes
- Catering facilities: On-board catering, E-catering
- Observation facilities: Large windows
- Baggage facilities: Available
- Other facilities: Below the seats

Technical
- Rolling stock: LHB coach
- Track gauge: Broad Gauge
- Operating speed: 59 km/h (37 mph) average including halts.
Route map
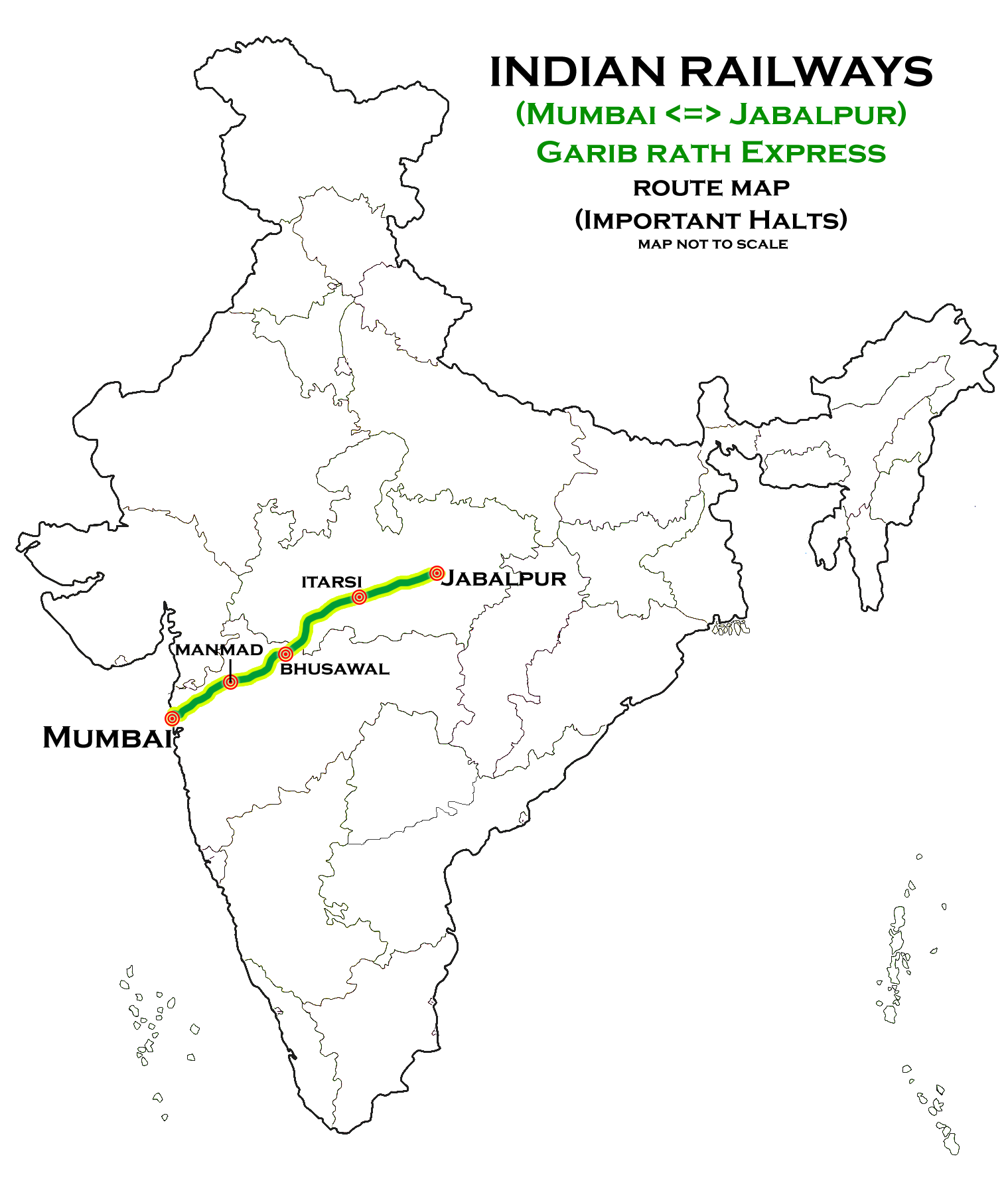

The 12187 / 12188 Jabalpur–Mumbai CSMT Garib Rath Express is a tri-weekly AC-Train service offered by West Central Railway, Which is running between Jabalpur in eastern Madhya Pradesh and Mumbai CSMT in Mumbai, Maharashtra.

== Number and nomenclature ==
The numbers provided for JABALPUR GARIB RATH EXPRESS are 12187 (Jabalpur–Mumbai) and 12188 (Mumbai– Jabalpur)

These train numbers were earlier referred for Rewanchal Express which was used to go via Itarsi Junction in Madhya Pradesh. Later on the train via Itarsi was cancelled and the number was allotted for JABALPUR GARIB RATH EXPRESS.

The name itself signifies the meaning – The Poor Chariot. The service was introduced and extension was proposed by Lalu Prasad Yadav (former railway minister) in year 2008 without its inauguration. Later it was inaugurated in year 2009 and again its extension until Allahabad was announced in Rail Budget 2010 but it is not yet implemented due to violent protest against the extension at Jabalpur.

== Traction ==
earlier was WCAM-3. now The train is hauled by a Itarsi Loco Shed-based WAP-7 electric locomotive from Jabalpur to Mumbai CSMT and vice versa.

== Coaches ==
earlier was ICF coach, since ICF Garib Rath rake are discontinued in 2024. The train now has 20 LHB coaches and most of them are of 18 AC 3 Tier & 2 EoG cum SLR.

== Route & halts ==
- Jabalpur Junction
- Narsinghpur
- Gadarwara
- Pipariya
- Itarsi Junction
- Harda
- Khandwa
- Bhusaval Junction
- Jalgaon Junction
- Manmad Junction
- Nasik Road
- Igatpuri
- Kalyan Junction
- Dadar
- Mumbai CSMT
