= Beed railway station =

Railway Station in Maharashtra, India

General information
- Location: Palwan, Maharashtra; India
- Coordinates: 18.972241°N 75.73437°E
- Elevation: 521 metres (1,709 ft)
- System: Indian Railways station
- Owner: Indian Railways
- Operator: Central Railway
- Line: Ahilyanagar–Parli Vaijnath railway line
- Platforms: 3
- Tracks: 6

Construction
- Structure type: Standard (on-ground station)
- Parking: Yes
- Cycle facilities: Yes

Other information
- Status: Active
- Station code: BEED
- Zone(s): Central Railway
- Division(s): Pune

History
- Opened: 17 September 2025
Location
- Location within India Location within Maharashtra

Beed railway station is an upcoming railway station in Beed district, Maharashtra. Its code is BEED. It will serve Beed city. The station consists of three platform. <Trains>{ 71442-71441 Beed-Ahilyanager Demu Express } The work on this rail line is expected to be finished year December 2025.

The first train from Ahilyanagar to Narayandoho ran on 19 March 2017. The second train ran on 26 Feb 2019 Ahilyanagar to Solapurwadi 37 km Third run fro. Solapurwadi to New Ashti on 29 Dec 2021,
