= Coimbatore–Nagercoil Express =

Train in India

Coimbatore – Nagercoil Superfast Express

Overview
- Service type: Superfast
- Status: Active
- Locale: Tamil Nadu
- First service: 1 February 2008; 18 years ago
- Current operator: Southern Railways

Route
- Termini: Coimbatore Junction (CBE); Nagercoil Junction (NCJ)
- Stops: 12
- Distance travelled: 533 km (331 mi)
- Average journey time: 9 hours 10 minutes
- Service frequency: Daily
- Train number: 22667/22668

On-board services
- Classes: Sleeper, A/C Sleeper
- Seating arrangements: Yes
- Sleeping arrangements: Yes
- Catering facilities: No

Technical
- Rolling stock: ICF coach
- Track gauge: 1,676 mm (5 ft 6 in)
- Operating speed: 56 km/h (35 mph) average with 14 halts

The 22668 / 22667 Coimbatore–Nagercoil Express is a Superfast Express train belonging to Southern Railway zone that runs between Coimbatore Junction and Nagercoil Junction of Tamil Nadu in India.

== Service and schedule ==
The train runs daily covering the total distance of 533 kilometres (331 mi) in approximately 9'1/2 hours.

== Route and stations ==
This train passes through 14 intermediate stations including Valiyur, Tirunelveli, Vanchi Maniyachi, Kovilpatti, Satur, Virudunagar Jn, Madurai Jn, Dindigul Jn, Karur, Pugalur, Erode Jn & Tiruppur

== Coach and rake ==
The Coimbatore–Nagercoil express has rake sharing arrangement with Nagercoil- Thiruvananthapuram passenger, which departs from NCJ daily at 06:30 hrs. The train is pulled by Arakkonam/Erode WAP4. The train has 10 sleeper, 2 unreserved coaches and 2 luggage break-cum van. and it was hauled by WAP-4
