= Vinod G. Khandare =

Indian army officer

Lieutenant General Vinod G. Khandare PVSM AVSM SM
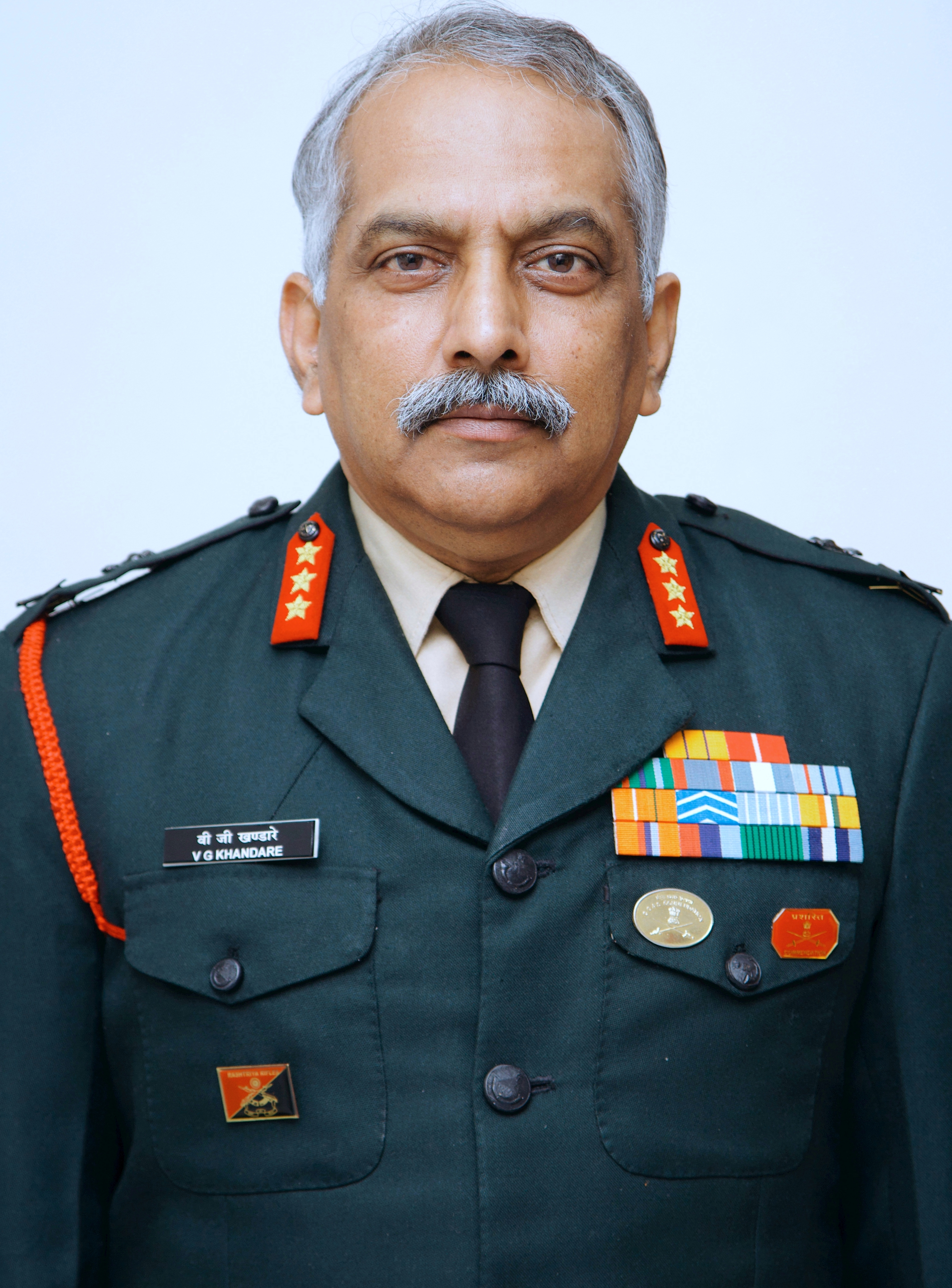
- Alma mater: Officers Training Academy, Chennai
- Military career
- Allegiance: India
- Branch: Indian Army
- Service years: September 1979 – January 2018
- Rank: Lieutenant General
- Service number: IC-37555Y
- Unit: Garhwal Rifles
- Commands: 14th Battalion Garhwal Rifles; 100 Mountain Brigade; 19th Infantry Division; Defence Intelligence Agency
- Awards: Param Vishisht Seva Medal; Ati Vishisht Seva Medal; Sena Medal (Gallantry); UN Medal
- Other work: Military Advisor to the National Security Council Secretariat of India

Lieutenant General Vinod G. Khandare, PVSM, AVSM, SM is a former officer of the Indian Army and was Principal Adviser in the Ministry of Defence. 2022 - 2025 He retired from active military service on 31 January 2018 and was the Military Advisor to the National Security Council Secretariat of India at the Secretary level from 2018 to 2021. In his final active military appointment, he served as both the Director General of the Defence Intelligence Agency and the Deputy Chief of Integrated Defence Staff for Intelligence from November 2015 to January 2018.

== Military career ==
Khandare was commissioned into 14 Garhwal Rifles of the Indian Army as a part of the SS-28 course of the Officers Training Academy, Chennai in September 1979. As an officer of the Infantry, he was involved in operational tasks in various sectors of Siachen, Jammu & Kashmir, Sikkim as well as the North East region. Khandare commanded a Brigade with an operational role on the North-Eastern Border of India. He served in Kashmir Valley in 2010–11 as Deputy GOC of Counter Insurgency Force in North Kashmir. He has served as instructor on weapons at Infantry School Mhow and as Directing Staff at Defence Services Staff College, Wellington. His final appointment was as Director General Defence Intelligence Agency (DIA), India from 2015 to 2018.

== Post-Military career ==
Khandare was appointed as the Military Advisor to the National Security Council Secretariat of India in October 2018. He succeeded Lt. General Prakash Menon, who was the Military Advisor from 2011 to 2014. The position remained vacant since then till Khandare was appointed in 2018, making him the second Military Advisor in the history of the NSCS. The Military Wing of the NSCS was revived as a part of his appointment. In September 2021, Khandare led an Indian Defence Delegation to Nigeria with the aim of enhancing defence cooperation avenues with Nigerian Defence Establishments. The delegation included members of the NSCS, Ministry of Defence, Ministry of External Affairs, the three Armed Forces as well as defence industry representatives.

== Honours and decorations ==
- UN Medal - ONUSAL - 1993
- Sena Medal (Gallantry) - Republic Day - 2002
- Chief of Army Staff Commendation Card - Army Day - 2012
- Ati Vishisht Seva Medal - Republic Day - 2015
- Param Vishisht Seva Medal - Republic Day - 2017
