= Adhartal =

- Town
- Location within India
- Coordinates: 23°12′N 79°57′E
- Country: India
- State: Madhya Pradesh
- District: Jabalpur
- Time zone: UTC+5:30 (IST)

Adhartal is a small town in Jabalpur district, Madhya Pradesh, India. The town is named after King Adhar Singh.
