= Habibganj =

Suburb of Bhopal, Madhya Pradesh, India

Coordinates: 23.221°N 77.439°E

Habibganj is a suburb in Bhopal, in the state of Madhya Pradesh in India. It is notable for BHEL township and the Habibganj railway station (renamed "Rani Kamalapati railway station" in November 2021), which is the country's first private as well as first world class railway station.

== Etymology ==
In Hindustani, "Habibganj" means "Lovely village/city". It was earlier a village outside Bhopal and was named so by the then begum of the Nawab of Bhopal because the greenery and lakes here used to enhance its beauty. As Bhopal city expanded, it gradually became a suburb of Bhopal.

== Transport ==
=== By road ===
Habibganj is located on NH 46, earlier known as Hoshangabad road, six kms from the old city of Bhopal. It is served by Bhopal city bus services. The outgoing inter-city buses also stop here.

=== By rail ===
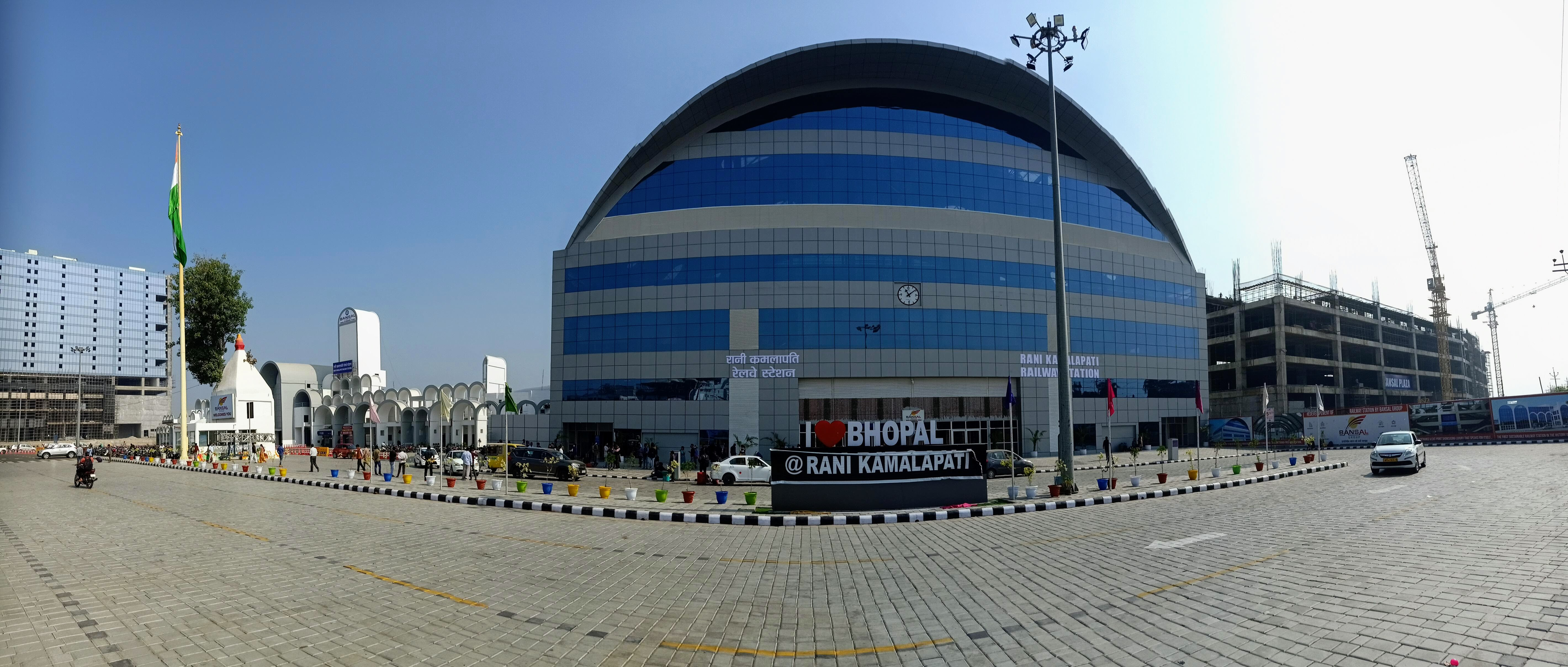
Old (left) and new (centre) main entrance buildings of the railway station

Habibganj is served by Habibganj railway station which was renamed as "Rani Kamalapati railway station" in 2021. The station is located 7 kilometres (4.3 mi) away from Bhopal Junction. It lies on the New Delhi–Chennai main line of the Indian Railways. It serves as a secondary station to Bhopal Junction railway station. 16 passenger trains originate from or terminate at this station in a week. 107 passenger trains halt at this station in a week.

The railway station was redeveloped on the lines of Germany’s Heidelberg railway station and is promoted as India’s first world-class station. The station now has various facilities like a large covered parking area, 24X7 power backup, drinking water, an air-conditioned lobby, offices, shops, high speed escalator, a lift, anchor stores, automobile showrooms, a convention centre, a hotel and a super speciality hospital.

The redeveloped railway station has received a GEM 5 star rating in GEM Sustainability Certification by ASSOCHAM for Green, sustainable design and eco-friendly project. The station has planned an extensive reuse of water with Zero discharge technology being utilised for sewage treatment systems. A provision for rainwater harvesting is also present at the station. To ensure clean energy, solar energy generation is implemented in the station. Around 6800 and 7300 square metres are identified for soft and hard landscaping respectively.

== BHEL township ==
Habibganj has a township of Bharat Heavy Electricals Limited (BHEL). It is an Indian central public sector undertaking and the largest government-owned power generation equipment manufacturer.
