= Pune–Rani Kamalapati Humsafar Express =

Train in India

Pune-Rani Kamalapati Humsafar Express
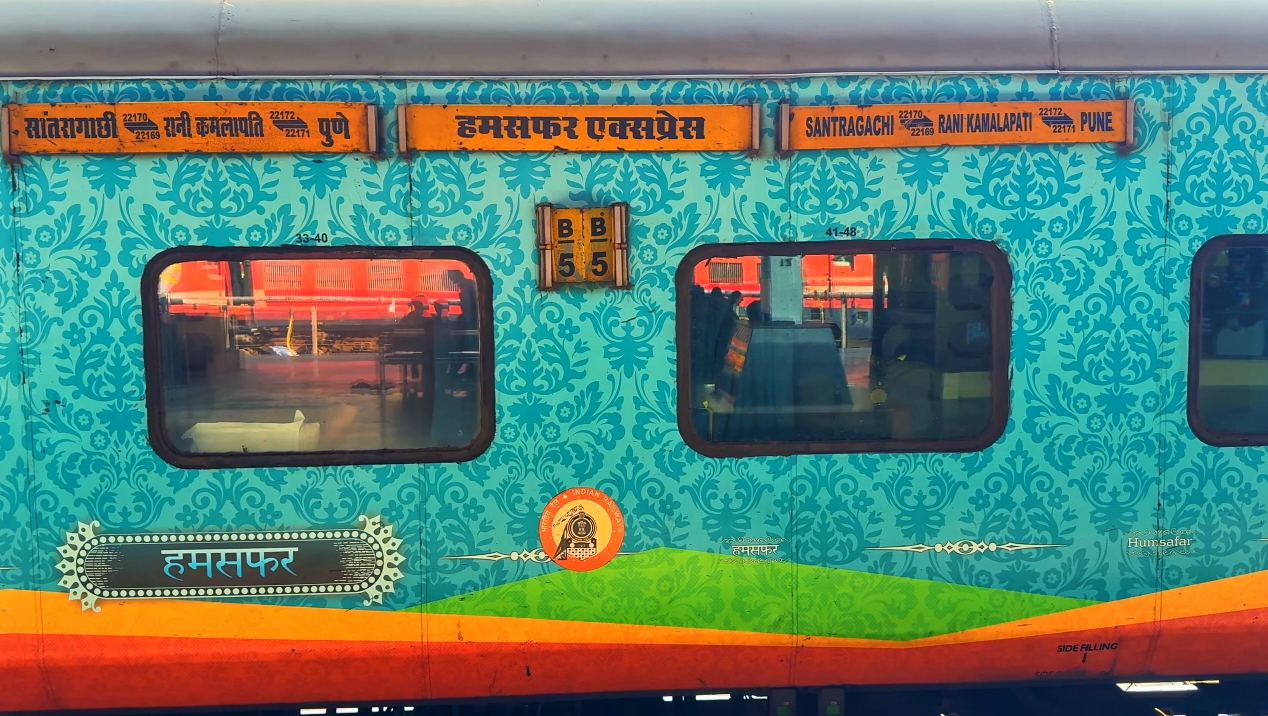
- Pune Humsafar Express At Itarsi Junction

Overview
- Service type: Humsafar Express
- First service: October 6, 2018; 7 years ago
- Current operator: West Central Railways

Route
- Termini: Pune (PUNE); Rani Kamalapati (RKMP)
- Stops: 7
- Distance travelled: 890 km (553 mi)
- Average journey time: 13h 30m
- Service frequency: Weekly
- Train number: 22171 / 22172

On-board services
- Class: AC 3 tier
- Seating arrangements: No
- Sleeping arrangements: Yes
- Catering facilities: Available
- Observation facilities: Large windows
- Baggage facilities: Yes

Technical
- Rolling stock: LHB Humsafar
- Track gauge: 1,676 mm (5 ft 6 in)
- Operating speed: 66 km/h (41 mph) Avg. Speed

The 22171/22172 Pune–Rani Kamalapati Humsafar Express is a Superfast Express train of the Indian Railways which belongs to West Central Railway zone that runs between Pune Junction of Maharashtra and Rani Kamalapati (Bhopal) of Madhya Pradesh in India. It is currently being operated with 22171/22172 train numbers on a weekly basis.

== Coach composition ==
The train is completely 3-tier AC sleeper designed by Indian Railways with features of LED screen display to show information about stations, train speed etc. and will have announcement system as well, Vending machines for tea, coffee and milk, Bio toilets in compartments as well as CCTV cameras.

== Service ==
It averages 66 km/h (41 mph) as 22171/Pune - Rani Kamalapati Humsafar Express starts on Sunday from Pune Junction covering 890 km (553 mi) in 13 hrs 30 mins & 56 km/h (35 mph) as 22172/Rani Kamalapati- Pune Humsafar Express starts on Saturday from Rani Kamalapati covering 890 km (553 mi) in 15 hrs 55 min.

== Traction ==
Both trains are hauled by an Electric Loco Shed Itarsi based WAP 7 locomotives from Pune to Rani Kamalapati and vice versa.

== Route and halts ==
- Pune Junction
- Daund Junction
- Ahilyanagar
- Kopargaon
- Manmad
- Bhusaval Junction
- Itarsi Junction
- Narmadapuram
- Rani Kamalapati

== Rake sharing ==
The train shares its rake with 22169/22170 Santragachi-Rani Kamalapati Humsafar Express.

== Direction reversal ==
Train reverses its direction one time:

- Daund Junction

== See also ==
- Santragachi-Rani Kamalapati Humsafar Express
- Humsafar Express
