= Piplani =

- locality
- Location of Piplani in Bhopal
- Coordinates: 23°14′49″N 77°28′7″E
- Country: India
- State: Madhya Pradesh
- District: Bhopal
- City: Bhopal

Government
  - Body: Bhopal Municipal Corporation
- Time zone: UTC+5:30 (IST)
- Pincode: 462022
- Telephone: +91755
- Vehicle registration: MP-04-

Piplani (Hindi: पिपलानी) is a town in Bhopal, India, in the BHEL township in the city of Bhopal.

== Etymology ==
Piplani is a derivative of Bhopal which is an adjacent village. Piplani houses the BHEL factory and offices. Nearby attractions include the NCC Grounds and the BHEL Cultural Hall.
