= Mandideep =

- Town
- Nickname: M.deep
- Location in Madhya Pradesh
- Coordinates: 23°5′40″N 77°31′5″E
- Country: India
- State: Madhya Pradesh
- Established: 1970's

Government
  - Type: Nagar Palika
- Elevation: 449 m (1,473 ft)

Population (2021;As per Aadhar)
  - Total: 202,789

Languages
  - Official: Hindi
- Time zone: UTC+5:30 (IST)
- PIN: 462046
- Telephone code: 07480
- Vehicle registration: MP-38
- Sex ratio: 1.29 ♂/♀
- Website: {{URL|example.com|optional display text}}

Mandideep is a town with municipality in Goharganj sub-district of Raisen district in the Indian state of Madhya Pradesh. Mandideep is 23 km from Bhopal and is basically an Industrial township which came into existence in late 1970s. The Mandideep Municipality has population of 59,654 of which 32,390 are males while 27,264 are females as per report released by 2011 Census of India. Literacy rate of Mandideep city is 83.76 % higher than state average of 69.32 %. In Mandideep, Male literacy is around 89.33 % while female literacy rate is 77.04. Mandideep's annual productions are worth some Rs. 20,000 crore, making it one of the most productive economic centers in India.

== History ==
Mandideep is closely connected to Bhimbetka, which is well known across the world for its rock paintings and also nearby Shiva Temple at Bhojpur (15 km) is a big attraction among the Hindu community. Looking back through history, Mandideep situated in close proximity to Bhojpur's Shiva temple was surrounded by a big lake since the 10th century. In the 15th century, Sultan Hussein Shah of Malwa demolished the Bhojpur dam, which kept releasing water for 3 years. Mandideep village came into existence when the land dried up. Initially, the pace of development was slow due to lack of infrastructure. In 1983, Mandideep housed 49 industrial units.

== Economy ==
It has an industrial area, just south of Bhopal capitalising on the proximity to Bhopal City. The major industries here are Hindustan Electro Graphite (HEG), Procter & Gamble, Eicher tractors Ltd, Lupin laboratories, and many more national and international level company have their manufacturing units at Mandideep.

In the 1980s, several changes helped industrial development. The Madhya Pradesh State Industrial Development Corporation completely aided by the state government was formed with the objective of promoting development of industries in this region.

About 660 plots were developed for various purposes. Besides, 45 km of pucca roads and a 42 km-long water supply system were developed.

Once a sleepy village in Bhopal district, Mandideep, which started on an area of 560 acres (2.3 km^{2}), is now sprawled across 2,000 acres (8.1 km^{2}). Mandideep has three sub-stations of 250 MW each at present along with other facilities.

Mandideep houses more than 650 industrial units belonging to reputed companies including that of Procter and Gamble, HEG, Lupin Laboratories, Tafe Tractors, Godrej Foods, Bhaskar Industries Private Limited (a unit of Dainik Bhaskar Print Media) Insulator and Electrical etc. It boasts of a total investment of more than Rs 10,000 crore.

== Demographics ==
As of the 2001 census, Mandideep had a population of 39,859 in 9,006 households. Males constitute 56% of the population and females 44%. Mandideep has an average literacy rate of 65%, higher than the national average of 59.5%: male literacy is 73%, and female literacy is 56%. 18% of the population here is under 6 years of age.

== Transport ==
The nearest airport is Bhopal. Mandideep is well connected to Railways, Roadways and Airways as it is a region of State Capital Bhopal.

Mandideep Railway Station has stoppages for trains like- Narmada Express 18233/18234, Penchvalley Fast Passenger 59385/59386, Jhansi Itarsi Nagpur Passenger 51827/51828, Mumbai CST Amritsar Express 11057/11058, Kushinagar Express 11015/11016.

Raja Bhoj International Airport is just 35 km from the area which serves daily flights for Ahmedabad, Bengaluru, Delhi, Hyderabad, Indore, Mumbai, Pune, Raipur, Shirdi, Surat, Udaipur.

There are also two main stations Rani Kamalapati railway station & Bhopal Junction railway station at a distance of 17km and 24 km respectively connecting Mandideep to all other parts of the country.
