= Rani Kamalapati railway station =

Railway station in Madhya Pradesh, India

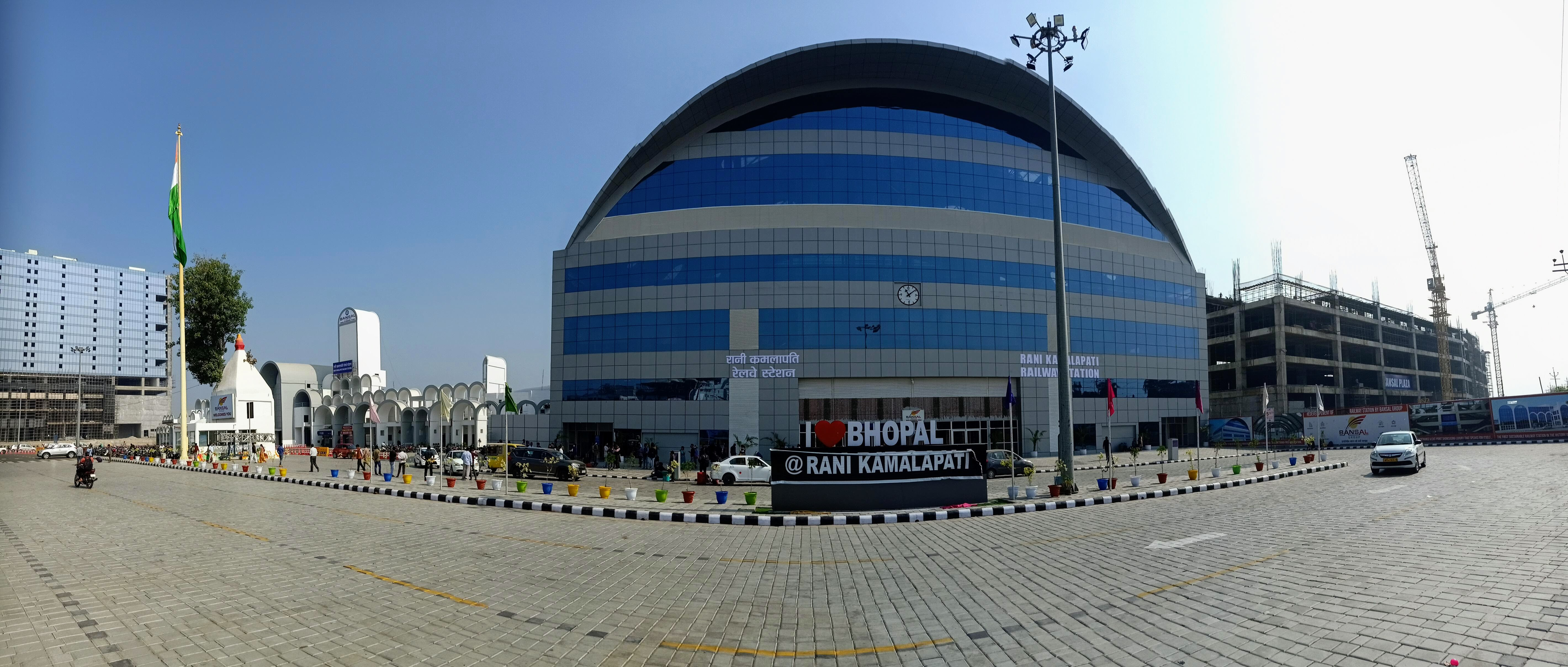
- Old (left) and new (centre) main entrance buildings of the railway station

General information
- Other names: Habibganj railway station
- Location: Maharana Pratap Nagar Zone 2, Habibganj Bhopal-462011, Madhya Pradesh, India
- Coordinates: 23.2216°N 77.4401°E
- Elevation: 495.760 metres (1,626.51 ft)
- System: Express and Passenger train station
- Owner: Indian Railway Stations Development Corporation
- Lines: Delhi–Chennai line Bhopal–Nagpur section
- Platforms: 5
- Tracks: 6
- Connections: Orange Line Rani Kamalapati Railway Station

Construction
- Structure type: At–ground
- Platform levels: 1
- Parking: Available
- Cycle facilities: Available

Other information
- Status: Active
- Station code: RKMP; HBJ (1920-2021)
- Fare zone: West Central Railway zone

History
- Opened: 1920; 106 years ago
- Rebuilt: 1969; 57 years ago 2021; 5 years ago
Location
- Location within Bhopal Location within Madhya Pradesh

Rani Kamalapati railway station, formerly Habibganj railway station (station code: RKMP), is a ISO certified railway station in Bhopal, in the Indian state of Madhya Pradesh. It lies on the New Delhi–Chennai main line of the Indian Railways. It comes under West Central Railway zone (WCR) of the Indian Railways and serves as headquarters of Bhopal railway division of WCR. It serves as a secondary station to Bhopal Junction railway station (the main station in Bhopal). It is India's first private railway station.

== History ==
The Bhopal–Itarsi section of the New Delhi–Chennai main line was opened in 1884, improving rail connectivity between central and southern India.

Habibganj railway station was established during the 1920s on this section to serve the then village of Habibganj, which lay outside the municipal limits of Bhopal. In 1969, the Government of Madhya Pradesh redeveloped the station as the city's second major railway station to reduce congestion at Bhopal Junction. The family of Prince Habibullah Khan donated land and ₹15 lakh for the station's development, after which it became known as Habibganj in his honour.

As part of the Indian Railways Station Redevelopment Programme, Indian Railway Stations Development Corporation (IRSDC) signed a concession agreement in 2016 for the station's redevelopment through a public–private partnership (PPP) with Bansal Pathways Habibganj Private Limited. The project became the first railway station redevelopment initiative in India to be implemented under the PPP model.

The redeveloped station was inaugurated on 15 November 2021. Designed as a modern multimodal transport hub, it incorporates airport-style passenger amenities, improved accessibility, energy-efficient infrastructure and commercial facilities. The project was developed under the PPP model and was described by the Government of India as the first world-class railway station in Madhya Pradesh.

Before the inauguration of the redeveloped station, the Government of Madhya Pradesh proposed renaming Habibganj railway station after the Gond queen Rani Kamalapati. Following approval by the Union Government, the station was officially renamed Rani Kamalapati railway station in November 2021, and its station code was changed from HBJ to RKMP.

== Major trains ==
The train which originates from Rani Kamalapati are :

● Rani Kamalapati–New Delhi Shatabdi Express (12001/12002)

● Rani Kamalapati–Jabalpur Jan Shatabdi Express (12061/12062)

● Lokmanya Tilak Terminus–Rani Kamalapati Superfast Express (12153/12154)

● Shaan-e-Bhopal Express (12155/12156)

● Rewanchal Express (12185/12186)

● Rani Kamalapati (Habibganj)–Hazrat Nizamuddin Vande Bharat Express (20171/20172)

● Rani Kamalapati (Habibganj)–Rewa Vande Bharat Express (20173/20174)

● Santragachi–Rani Kamalapati Humsafar Express (22169/22170)

● Pune–Rani Kamalapati Humsafar Express (22171/22172)

● Adhartal–Rani Kamalapati Intercity Express (22187/22188)

== Infrastructure ==
The station has 5 platforms with 6 tracks. The railway station was redeveloped on the lines of Germany’s Heidelberg railway station and is promoted as India’s first world-class station. The station now has various facilities like large covered parking area, 24X7 power backup, drinking water, air-conditioned lobby, offices, shops, high speed escalator, lift, anchor stores, automobile showrooms, a convention centre, a hotel and a super speciality hospital.

The redeveloped railway station has received GEM 5 star rating in GEM Sustainability Certification by ASSOCHAM for Green, sustainable design and eco-friendly project. The station has planned an extensive reuse of water with Zero discharge technology being utilised for sewage treatment systems. A provision of rainwater harvesting is also present at the station. To ensure clean energy, solar energy generation is implemented in the station. Around 6800 and 7300 square metres are identified for soft and hard landscaping respectively.

== Services ==
The station is located 7 kilometres (4.3 mi) away from Bhopal Junction. It lies on the New Delhi–Chennai main line of the Indian Railways. It serves as a secondary station to Bhopal Junction railway station.

== See also ==
Other railway stations serving Bhopal metropolitan area

- Bhopal Junction railway station
- Mandideep railway station
- Misrod railway station
- Nishatpura railway station
- Sant Hirdaram Nagar railway station

| Preceding station | Indian Railways | Following station |
|---|---|---|
| Bhopal Junction towards ? | Central Railway zone Delhi–Chennai line | Misrod towards ? |
