= Arera Colony =

- locality and residential area
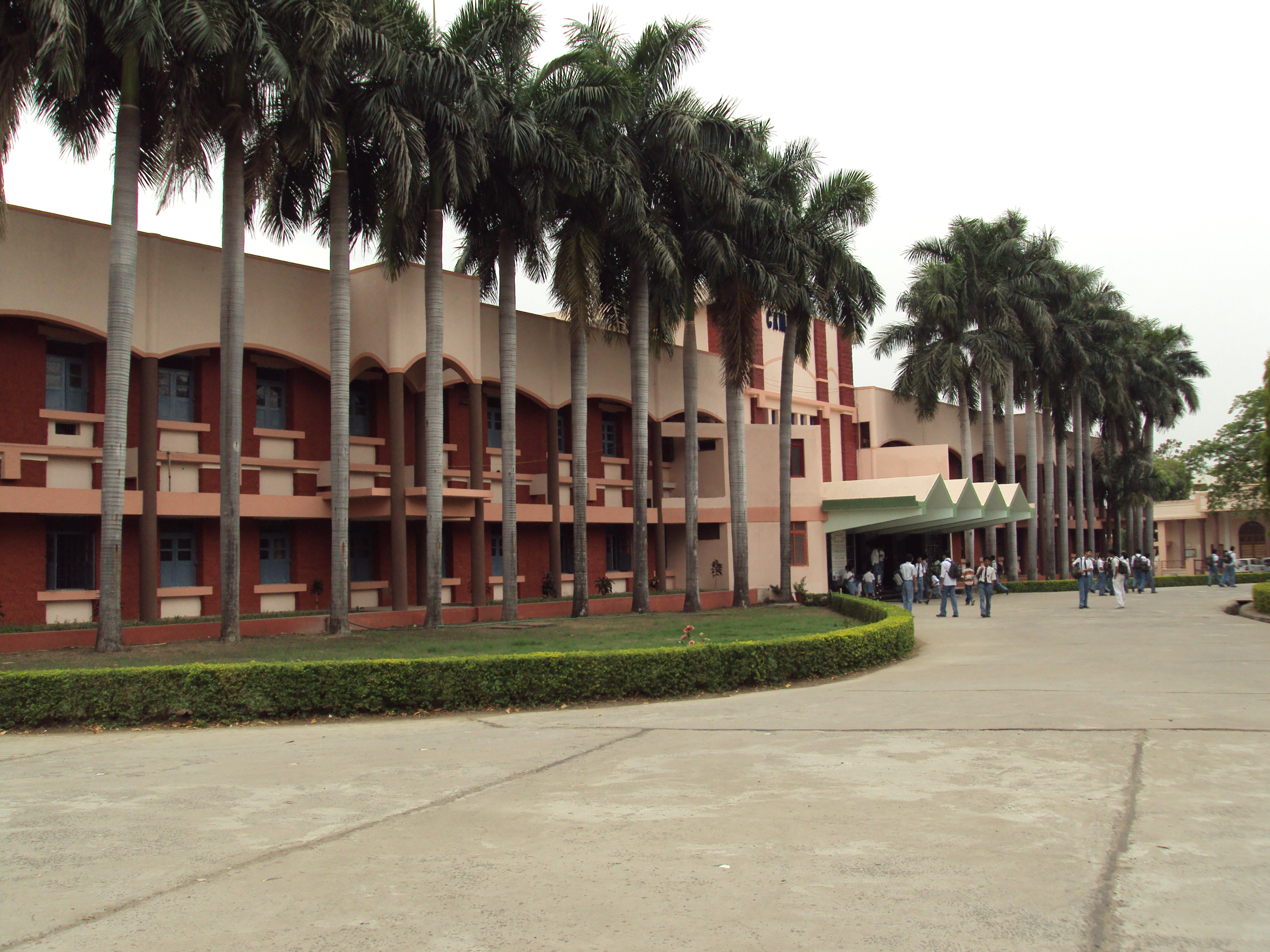
- Campion School in Arera Colony

- Location of Arera Colony in Bhopal
- Coordinates: 23.21118°N 77.432905°E
- Country: India
- State: Madhya Pradesh
- District: Bhopal
- City: Bhopal

Government
  - Body: Bhopal Municipal Corporation
- Time zone: UTC+5:30 (IST)
- Pincode: 462010
- Telephone: +91755
- Vehicle registration: MP-04-

Arera Colony is one of the largest residential areas in Bhopal, Madhya Pradesh, India. Characterised by plantations, trees and gardens, it is considered one of the more affluent localities in the city and occupies a large portion of central and southern Bhopal. The locality is divided into five Sectors, E-1 through E-5. Subsequently developed housing board areas designated as MIG and HIG are known as sectors E-6 & E-7, while an adjacent private colony is referred to as E-8.

== Gates and commercialization ==
Although all streets in Arera Colony are public thoroughfares, residents of sectors E-1 to E-6 have installed gates, a practice described as illegal. This trend of creating gated residential areas expanded further in 2025. In recent years, commercial establishments have also been constructed in contravention of zoning laws that permit only residential development. Residents have stated that the installation of gates was intended to prevent such commercialisation.

== Sports ==
The Arjun Fitness Club, located at Bittan Market, offers facilities for swimming, squash, gym workouts, and other sports. In addition, Arera Colony contains a large number of playgrounds. The Arera Cricket Club is based at the Old Campion Ground near the 10 No. Market. The ground annually hosts the Mayank Chaturvedi Smriti Cricket Tournament, which attracts teams from across the country.
