= Electric Loco Shed, Itarsi =

Loco shed in Madhya Pradesh, India

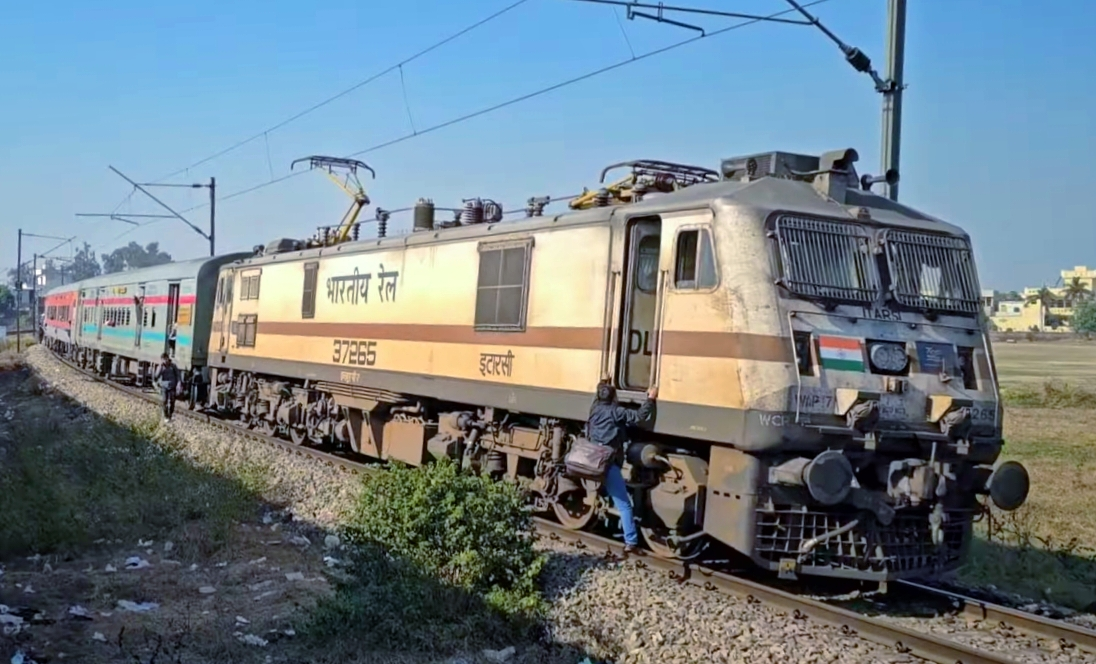
- Itarsi based WAP-7 hauling Swaraj Express at Jalandhar Cantt

- Location within Madhya Pradesh

Location
- Location: Itarsi, Madhya Pradesh
- Coordinates: 22°36′29″N 77°46′01″E

Characteristics
- Owner: Indian Railways
- Operator: West Central Railway zone
- Depot code: ET
- Type: Engine shed
- Rolling stock: WAP-7; WAG-9

History
- Opened: 1991; 35 years ago
- Former rolling stock: WAM-4; WAP-4; WAG-5; EF12K

Electric Loco Shed, Itarsi is a motive power depot performing locomotive maintenance and repair facility for electric locomotives of the Indian Railways, located at Itarsi of the West Central Railway zone in Madhya Pradesh, India. It is one of the major Electric loco shed in West Central Railway of the three sheds, others being at Electric Loco Shed, Tuglakabad (TKD) and New Katni Jn (NKJ). As of 1 April 2026 there are 298 locomotives in the shed.

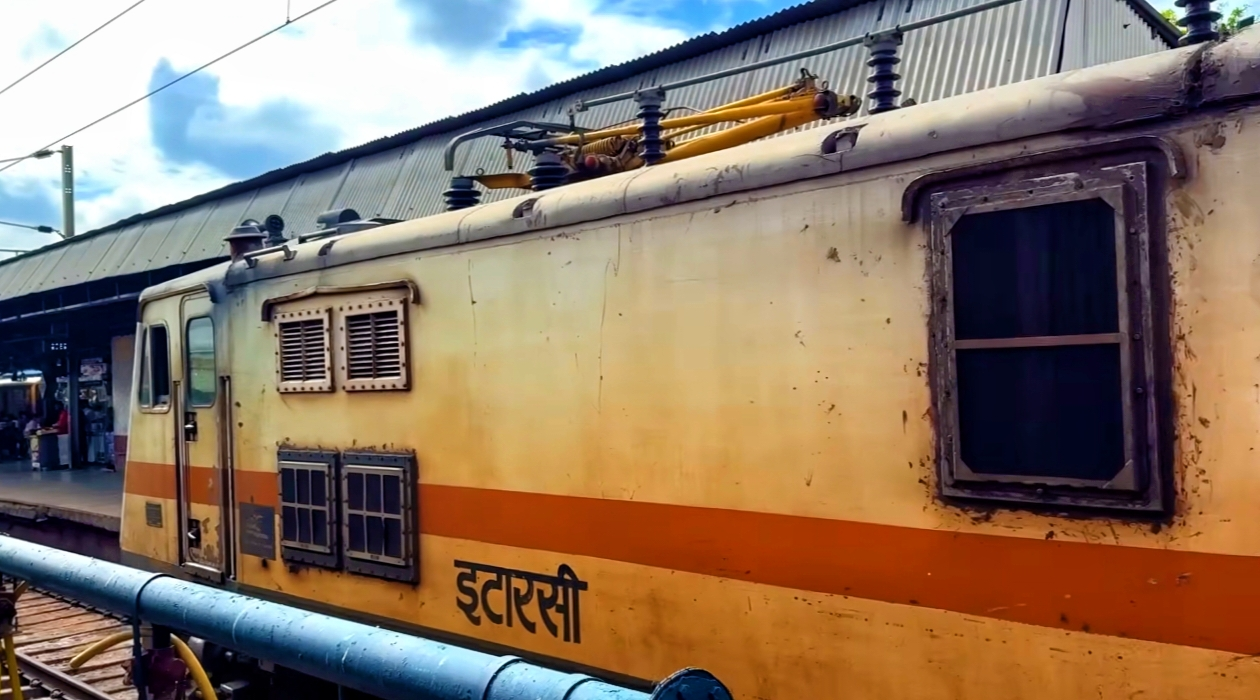
Itarsi WAP-7 At Prayagraj Junction railway station

== History ==
Steam locomotives used to exist at Itarsi until the late 1970s. After Central Railway (former, now under West Central Railways) set a deadline to eliminate all steam locomotive operations by 1990, a push was given towards establishing electric locomotion as the primary motive power, and the steam locomotive sheds were decommissioned. To meet the needs of exponentially increasing rail traffic on the new continuous broad-gauge lines from Central Madhya Pradesh to rest of India with the completion of gauge conversion, the Itarsi was selected by Indian Railways for a new electric locomotive shed.

With the completion of Bhopal-Khandwa Electrification in the year 1990–1991, new electric locomotive shed was inaugurated in July 1991 with 15 Indian locomotive class WAG-2 which stayed until late 2000, when they were withdrawn from service. It later got a large fleet of WAM-4 locos from Electric Loco Shed, Ajni and WAG-5 from other sheds but later some of these were then moved to other sheds and now all WAM-4 are withdrawn from service/scrapped. All WAG-5 locos are either transferred to New Katni ELS, Katni DLS, Itarsi DLS or scrapped. New WAP-7 locos were acquired in 2018. In November 2020, Itarsi ELS got its first WAG-9 locomotive.

== Operations ==
Being one of the three electric engine sheds in West Central Railway, various major and minor maintenance schedules of electric locomotives are carried out here. It has the sanctioned augmented capacity of 175 locomotives units. Beyond the sanctioned capacity, this shed houses a total of 171 engine units, including 19 WAP-4, 55 WAP-7 and 97 WAG-9 and the holding numbers are going to increase in the near future as new locos have been allotted by Railway board to ET shed. Like all locomotive sheds, ET does regular maintenance, overhaul and repair including painting and washing of locomotives. It handled prestigious trains like the Amarkantak Express, Rani Kamlapati-Jabalpur Janshatabdi Express, Humsafar Express and many more mail express and superfast trains. It formerly used to hold the largest fleet of WAP-4 locomotives all over the Indian Railways but now a major chunk of the WAP-4 locomotives has been transferred to other sheds. Itarsi based WAG-9 locomotives perform banking duties with fully loaded freight trains at Budni ghats.

== Livery and markings ==
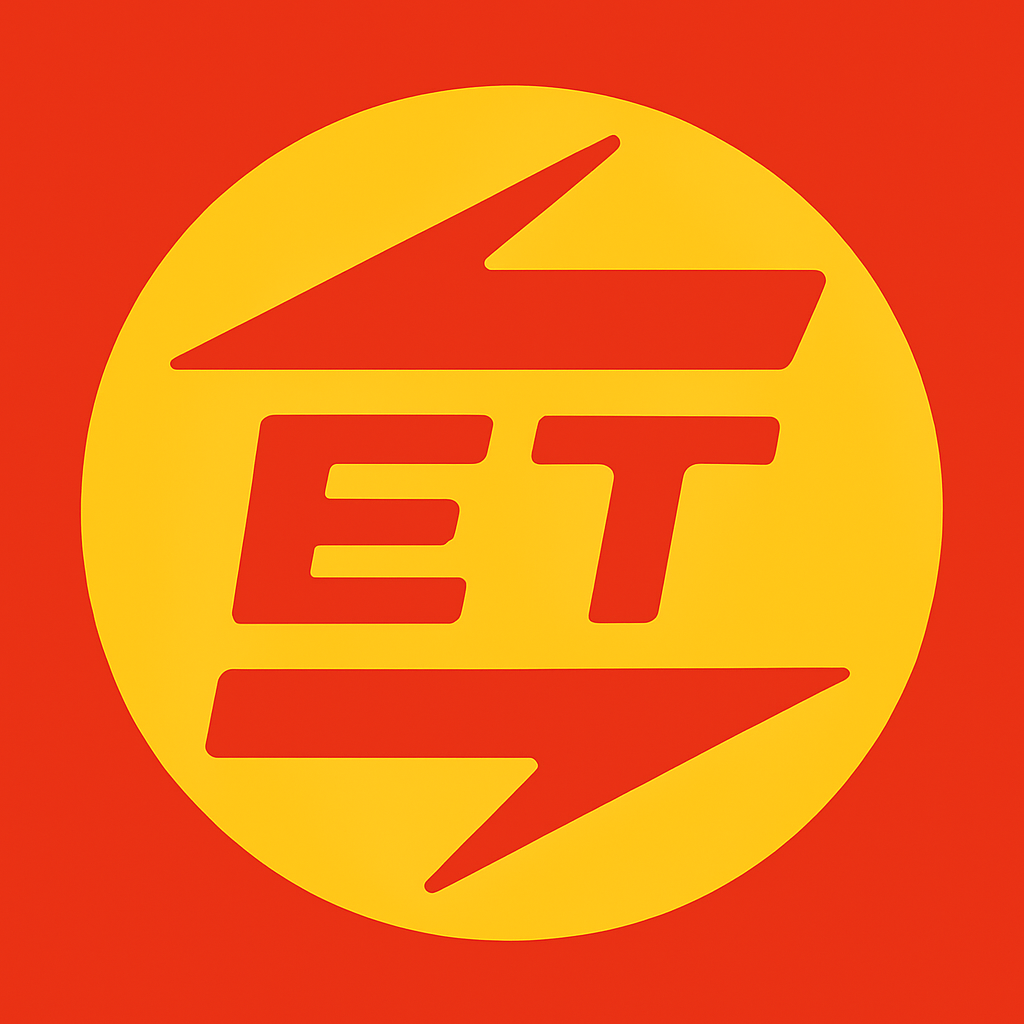
Logo Mark of Electric Loco Shed, Itarsi

Itarsi ELS has its own logo and stencils. It is written on loco's body side as well as front & back side.

== Locomotives ==
Serial No.	Locomotive Class	Horsepower	Quantity
1.	WAP-7	6350	97
2.	WAG-9	6120	203
Total locomotives active as of April 2026			298

=== Former locomotives ===
List of locomotives formerly at the Electric Loco Shed, Itarsi
SN	Type of Loco	HP	Comments
1.	WAG-5	3850	All locomotives transferred to DLS/ET
2.	WAM-4	3640	All locomotives scrapped
3.	WAP-4	5050	All locomotives transferred to other sheds
