= Maladevi Temple =

Jain Temple located in Gyaraspur, Vidisha, Madhya Pradesh, India

Maladevi temple
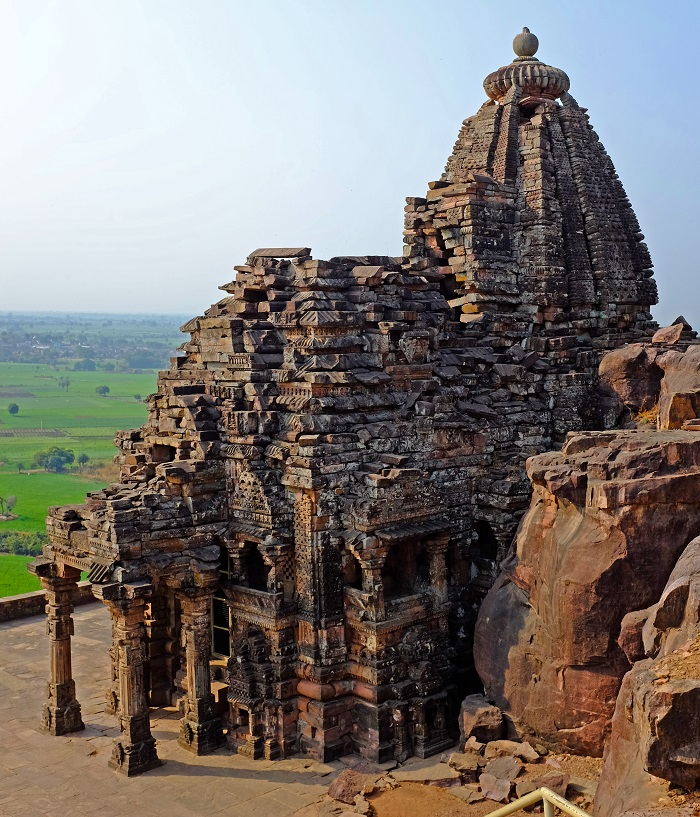
- Maladevi Temple

Religion
- Affiliation: Jainism
- Deity: Adinatha
- Festival: Mahavir Jayanti

Location
- Location: Gyaraspur, Vidisha, Madhya Pradesh
- Interactive map of Maladevi temple
- Coordinates: 23°39′32.1″N 78°06′49.1″E

Architecture
- Style: Māru-Gurjara
- Creator: Pratihara dynasty Kalachuris of Tripuri
- Established: 850-900 CE
- Temple: 1

Maladevi Temple is a Jain temple located in Gyaraspur town of Vidisha in state of Madhya Pradesh, India. It is a rock-cut temple built in Gurjara Pratihara style and dates back to the 850–900 CE worship site.

== History ==
Maladevi Temple dates back to the 850–900 CE worship site. Epigraphist Richard G. Salomon suggests that temple was originally built as Jaina-Brahmanical hybrid. An Kalachuri inscription dating back to 850-885 CE, records the foundation of the temple during the reign of Valleka is preserved in British Museum.

== Temple ==
Maladevi Temple is the largest and finest temple of Gyaraspur. It is famous for carvings and craftmanship, that are representative of post-Gupta architecture. It is a rock-cut temple built in Gurjara Pratihara style. The temple was a constructed around a sanctified natural cavern as the garbhagriha. The temple is rich with carvings of tirthankaras, yakshi, and yaksha. The temple consists of an entrance porch, mandapa garbhagriha and lofty shikhara bearing rich carvings. The temple houses a number of Jain idols, yet the figures of Goddesses on the outer door-frame and the name of the temple indicates that it was originally a Brahmical temple. The temple is dedicated to Adinatha.

The temple is considered one of the best examples of collections of varied Jain sculptures. The temple houses a carved idol of Shantinatha in lotus position with a symbol of deer and four armed yaksha and yakshi. There is image of Goddess Chakreshvari carved on the lalata-bimba. An idol of Parshvanatha dated 9th century is also enshrined inside the temple. The presence of images of 24 yaksha and yakshi inside the temple indicates the worship of each yaksha and yakshi during the 9th century.

The temple records various pilgrim sites such as Sobhasapranamati, Baswanapranamati, and Ambadevapranamati. It also houses an eigh-handed idol of Goddess with Tarapati engraved on leaves of lotus throne.

== Gallery ==
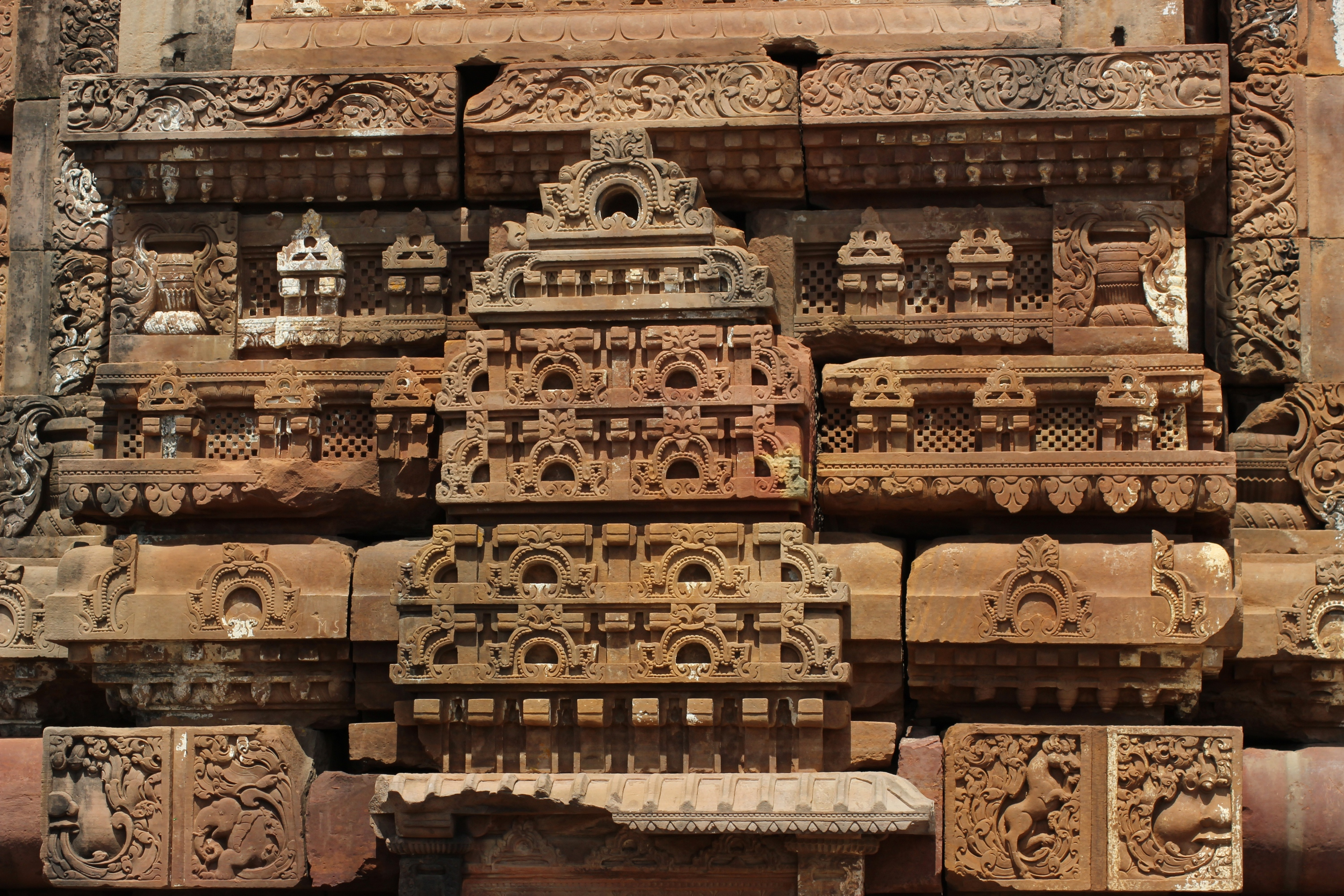
Entrance

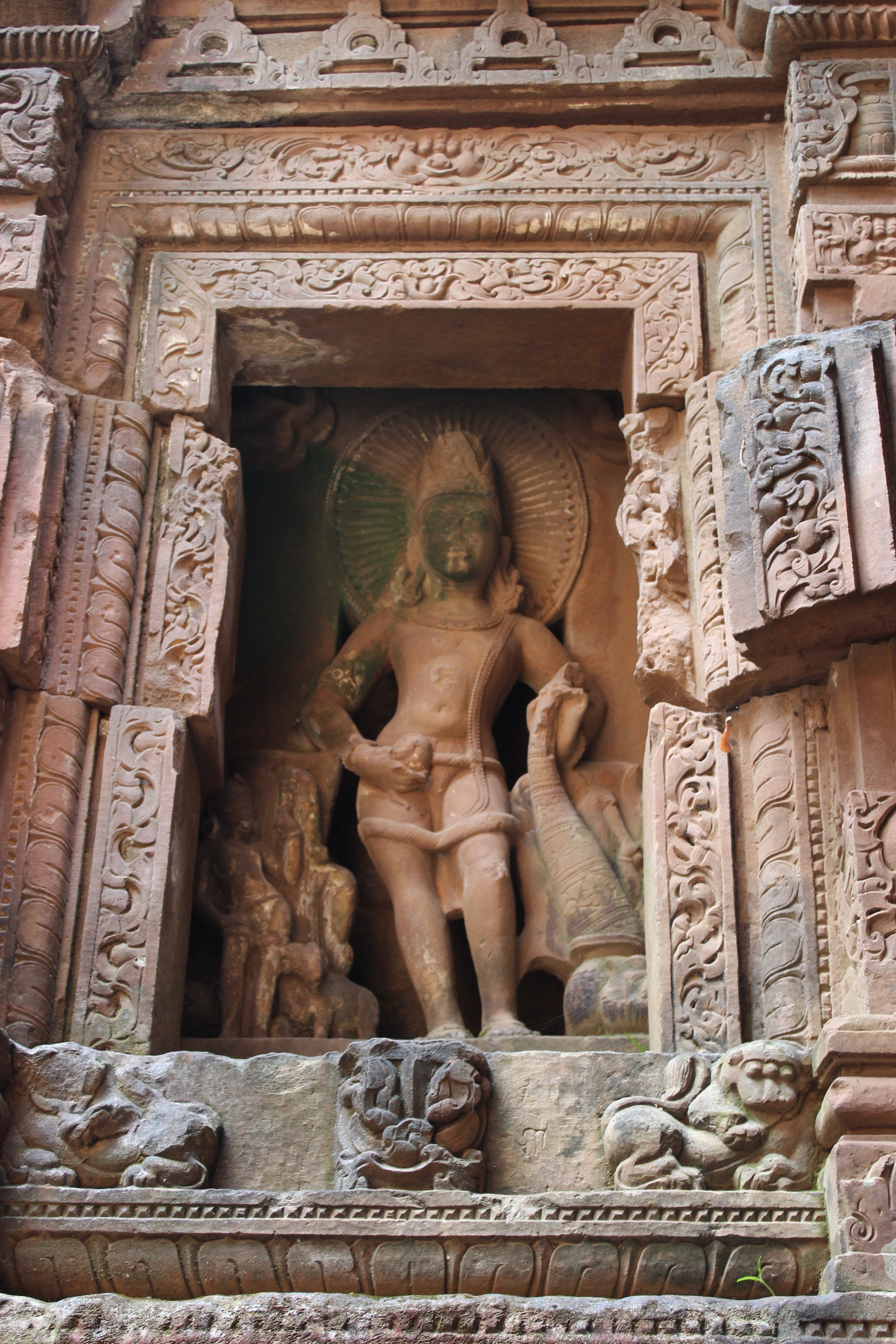
Carving of a yaksha

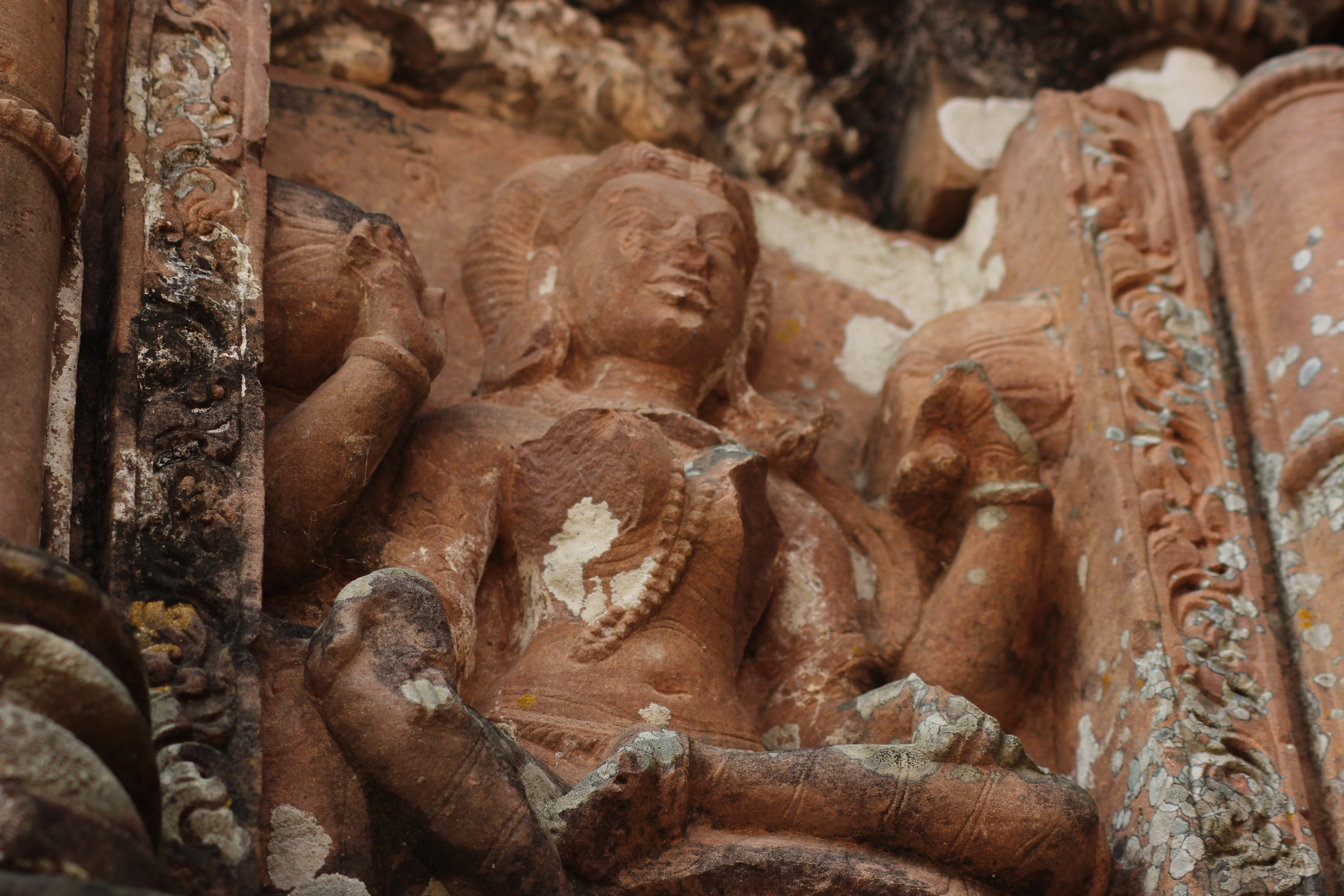
Carving of a yakshi

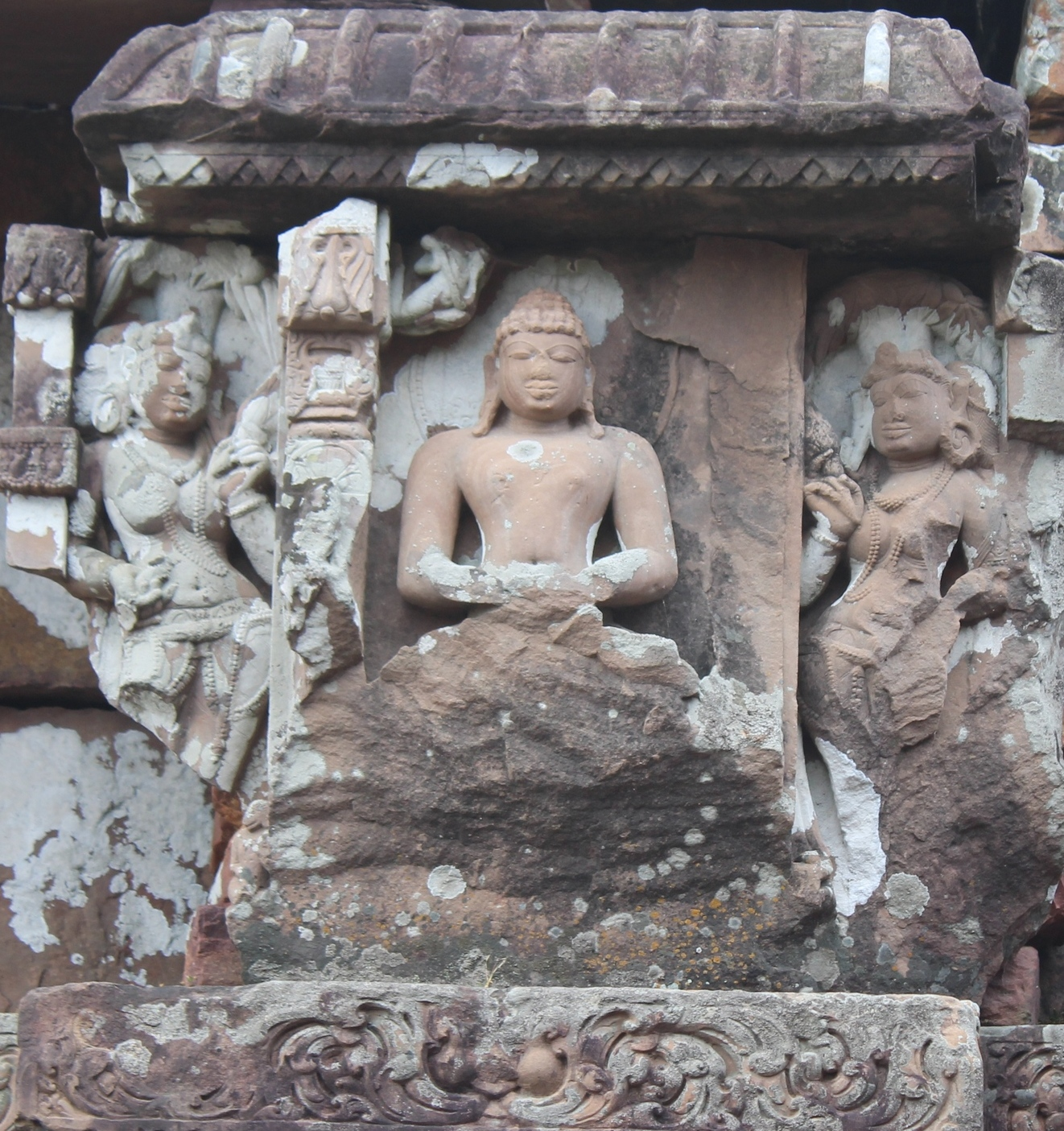
Tirthankar carved on shikhara

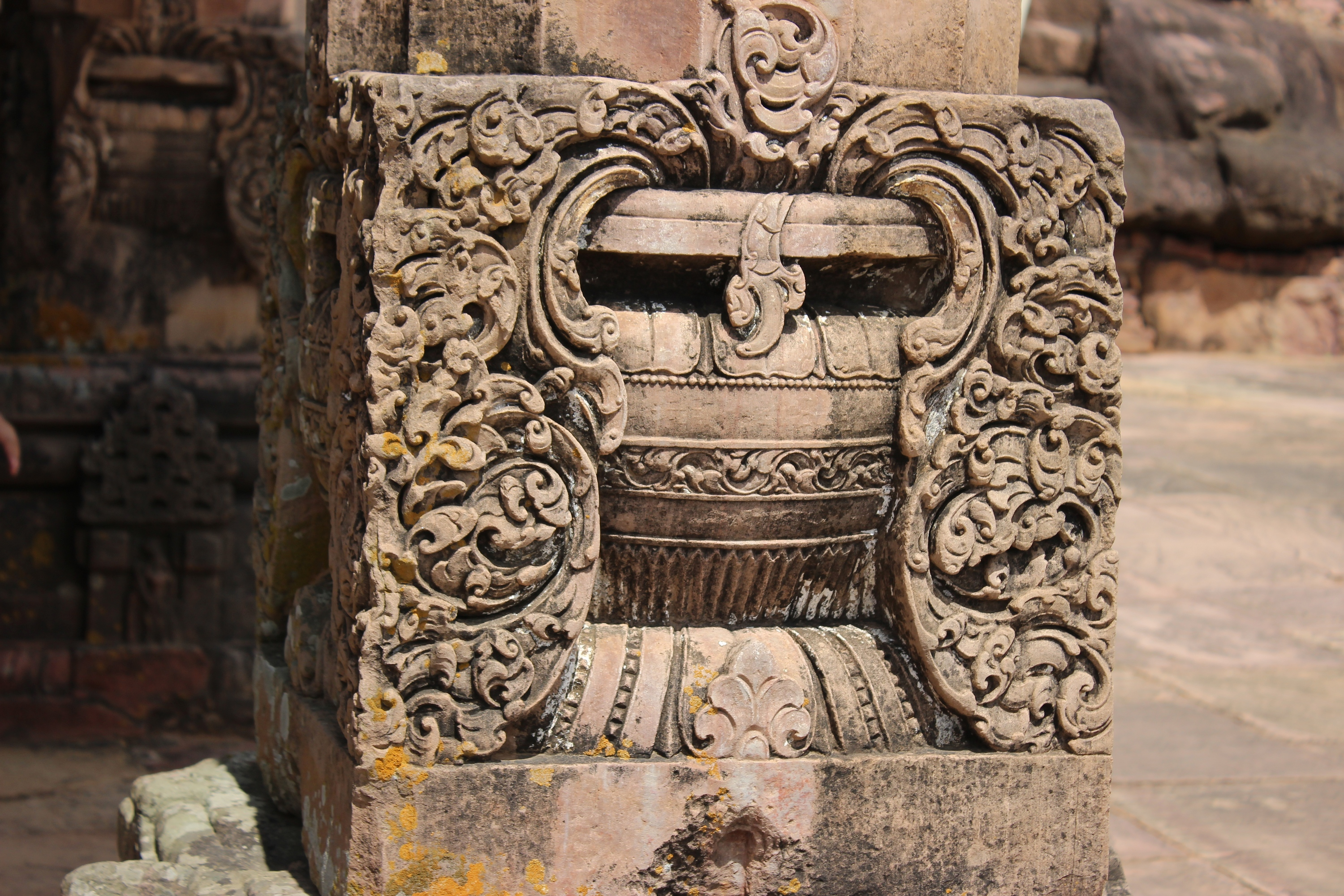
Carving of kalasha on pillars

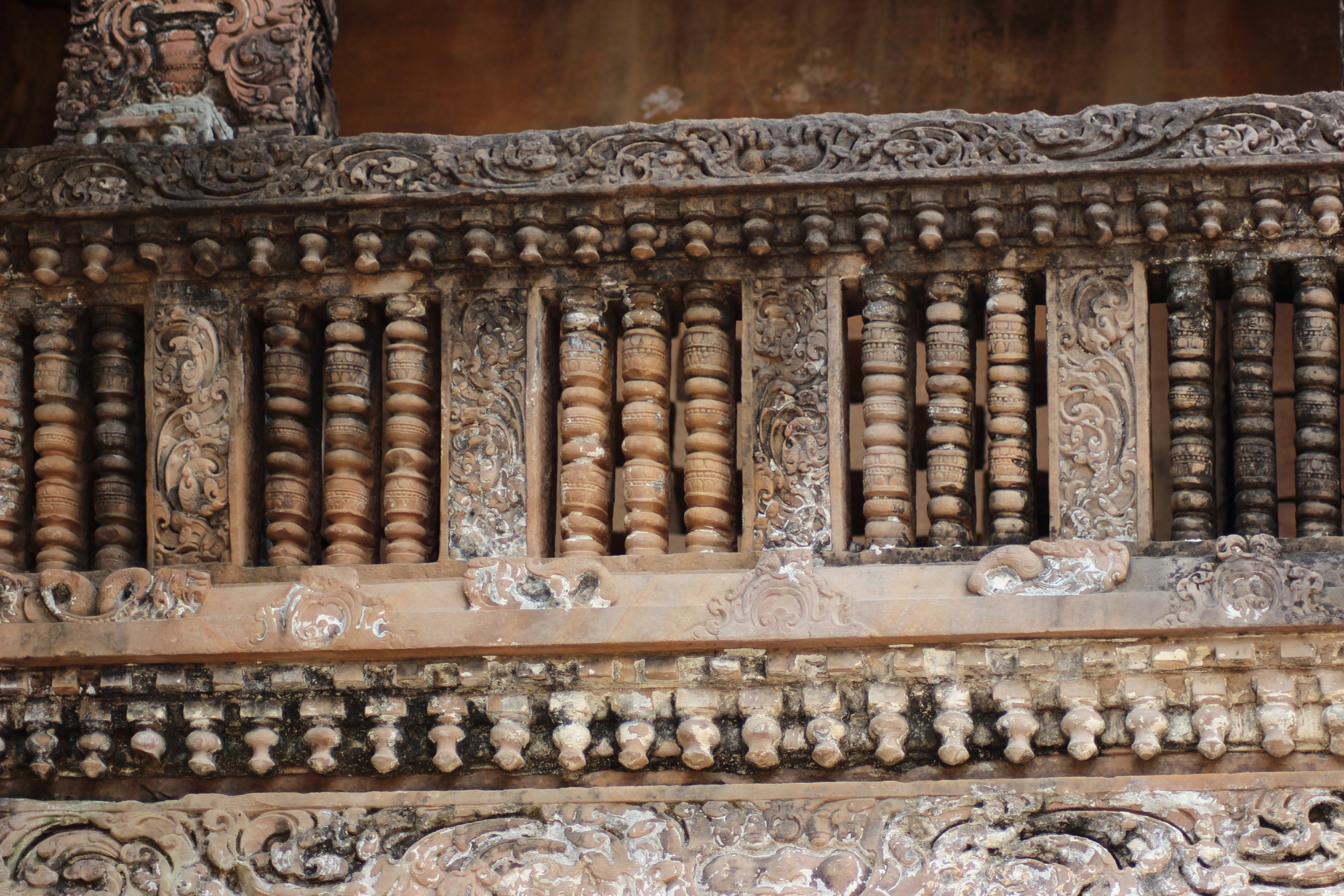
Richly carved courtyard

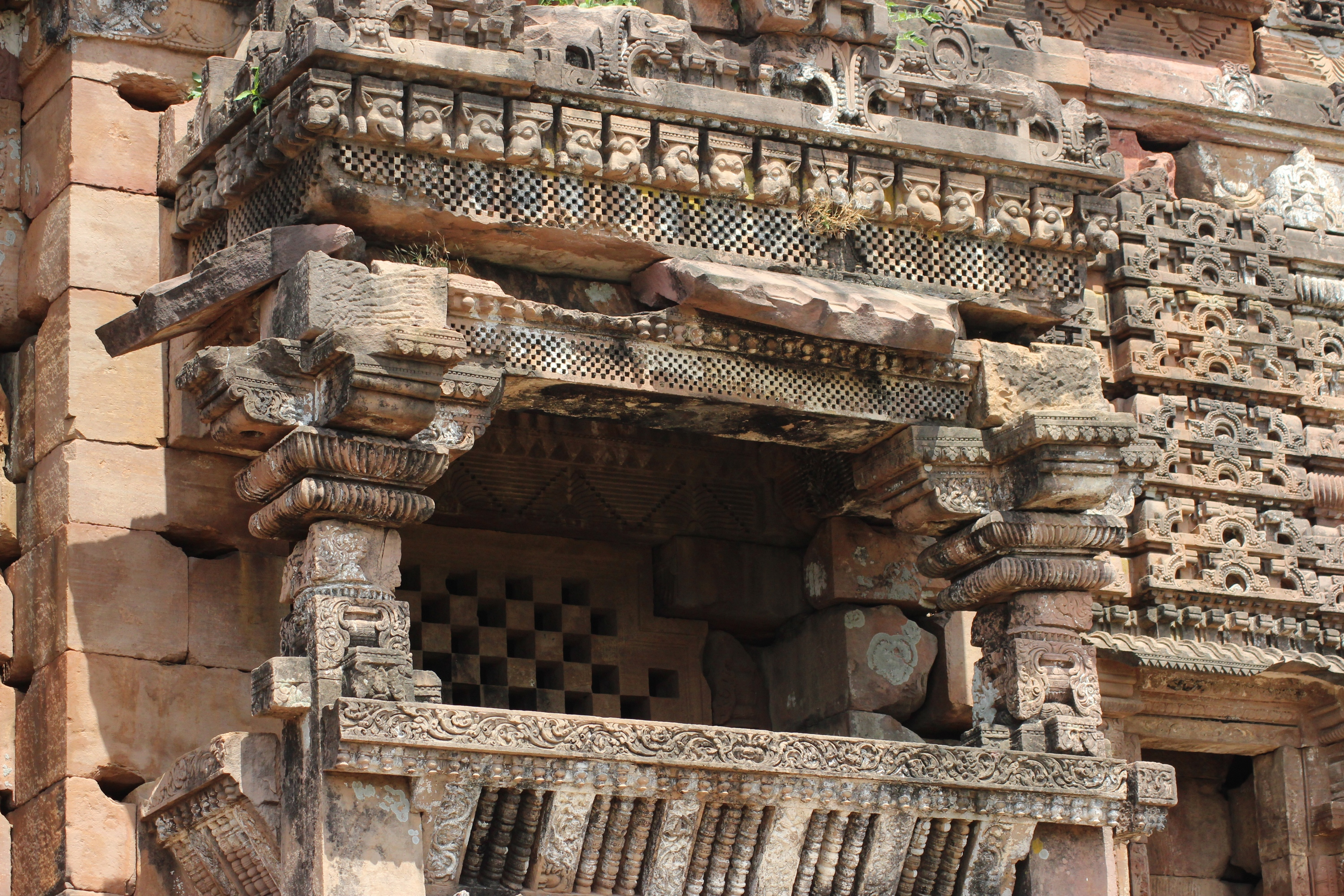
Richly carved window

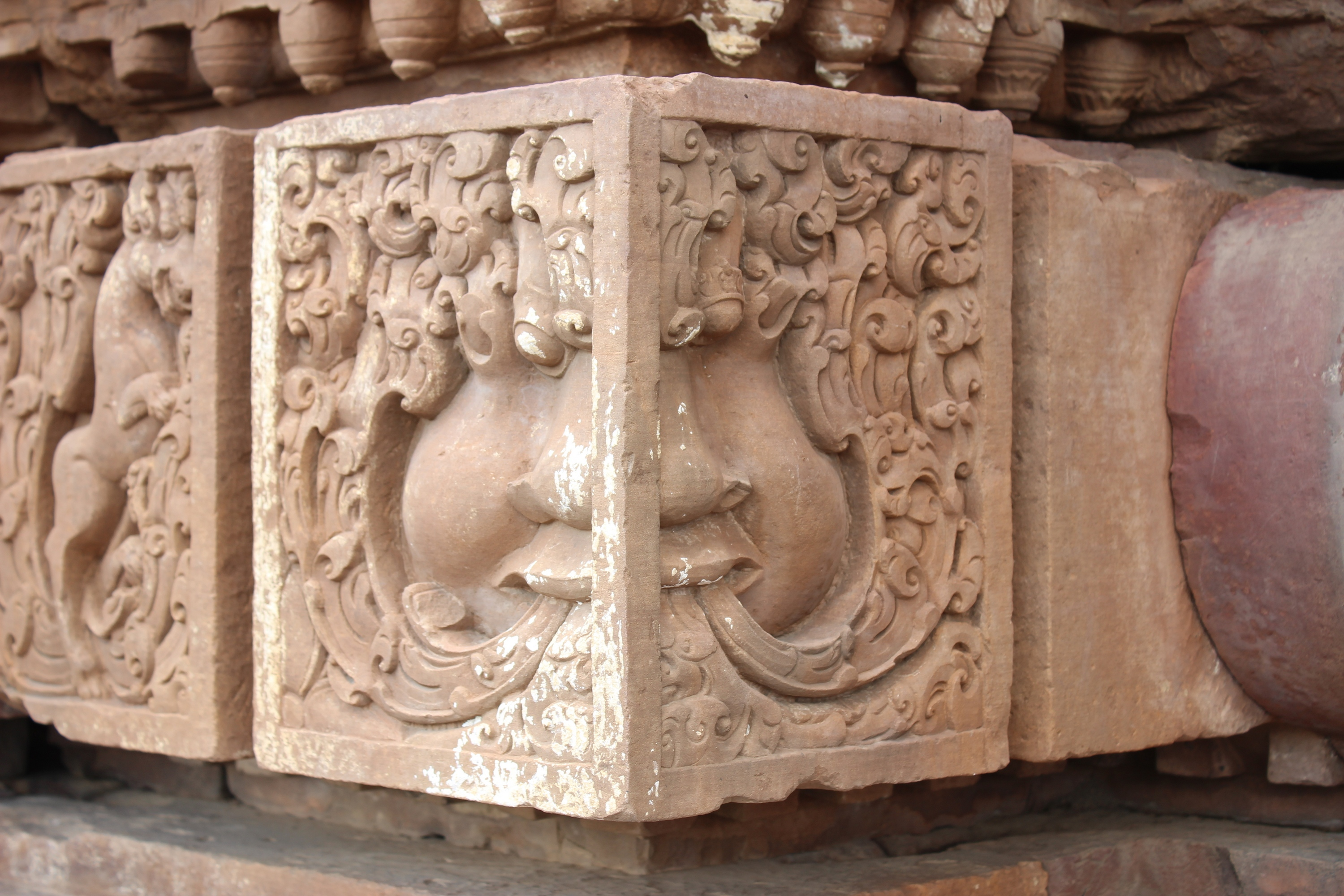

== Restoration ==
In 1930, Gwalior state stepped up to conserve Maladevi temple. Maladevi temple in Vidisha is protected by Archaeological Survey of India. In 2026, the Archaeological Survey of India initiated the process of dismantling and reconstructing the temple as part of its conservation efforts.

== See also ==
- Jain temples, Vidisha
- Bajramath temple
- Gadarmal Devi temple
- Udayagiri Caves
- Pathari Jain temples
