= Bajramath Temple =

Jain temple in the state of Madhya Pradesh

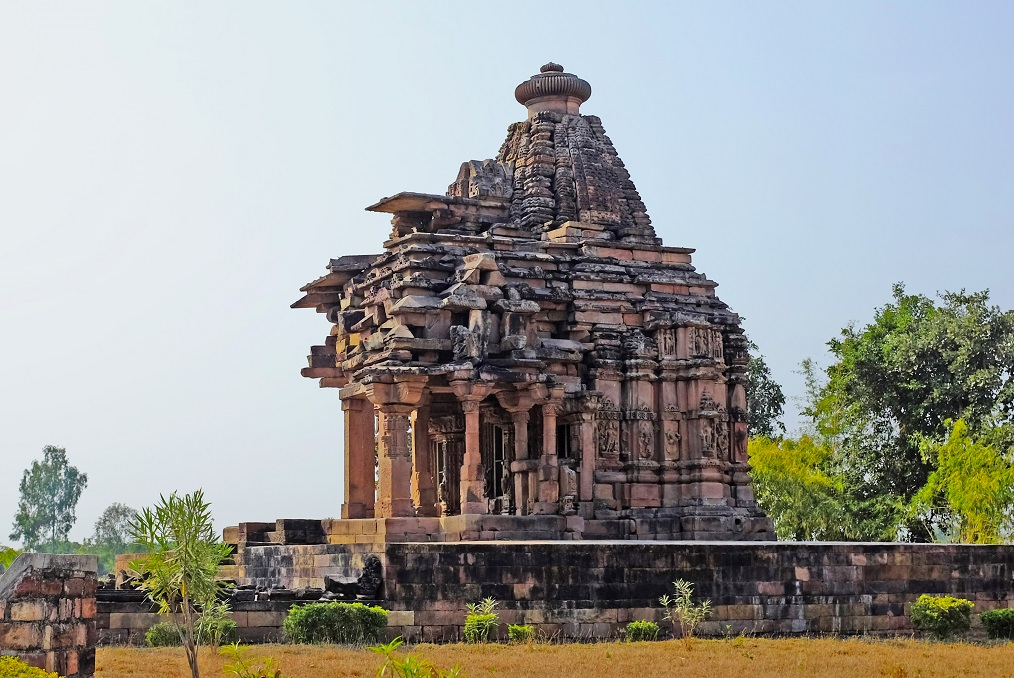
- Bajramath Temple

Religion
- Affiliation: Hinduism, Jainism
- Deity: Tirthankara
- Festival: Mahavir Jayanti

Location
- Location: Gyaraspur, Vidisha, Madhya Pradesh
- Interactive map of Bajramath Temple
- Coordinates: 23°39′45″N 78°06′42″E

Architecture
- Style: Māru-Gurjara
- Creator: Pratihara dynasty
- Established: 9th century CE
- Temple: 1

Bajramath Temple is a Jain temple located in Gyaraspur town of Vidisha in state of Madhya Pradesh, India.

== History ==
Bajramath Jain Temple dates back to the 9th century. The temple is now under AIS

== About temple ==
Bajramath Temple is famous for carvings and craftmanship, and are representative of post-Gupta architecture. This temple enshrines three garbhagrihas with the temple is fully decorated with Jain sculptures. The central garbhagriha is 7.33 feet (2.23 m) long and other two are 6.33 feet (1.93 m) long. The large mandapa is supported by 16 pillars, balcony on each side and a staircase on east.

== Photo gallery ==
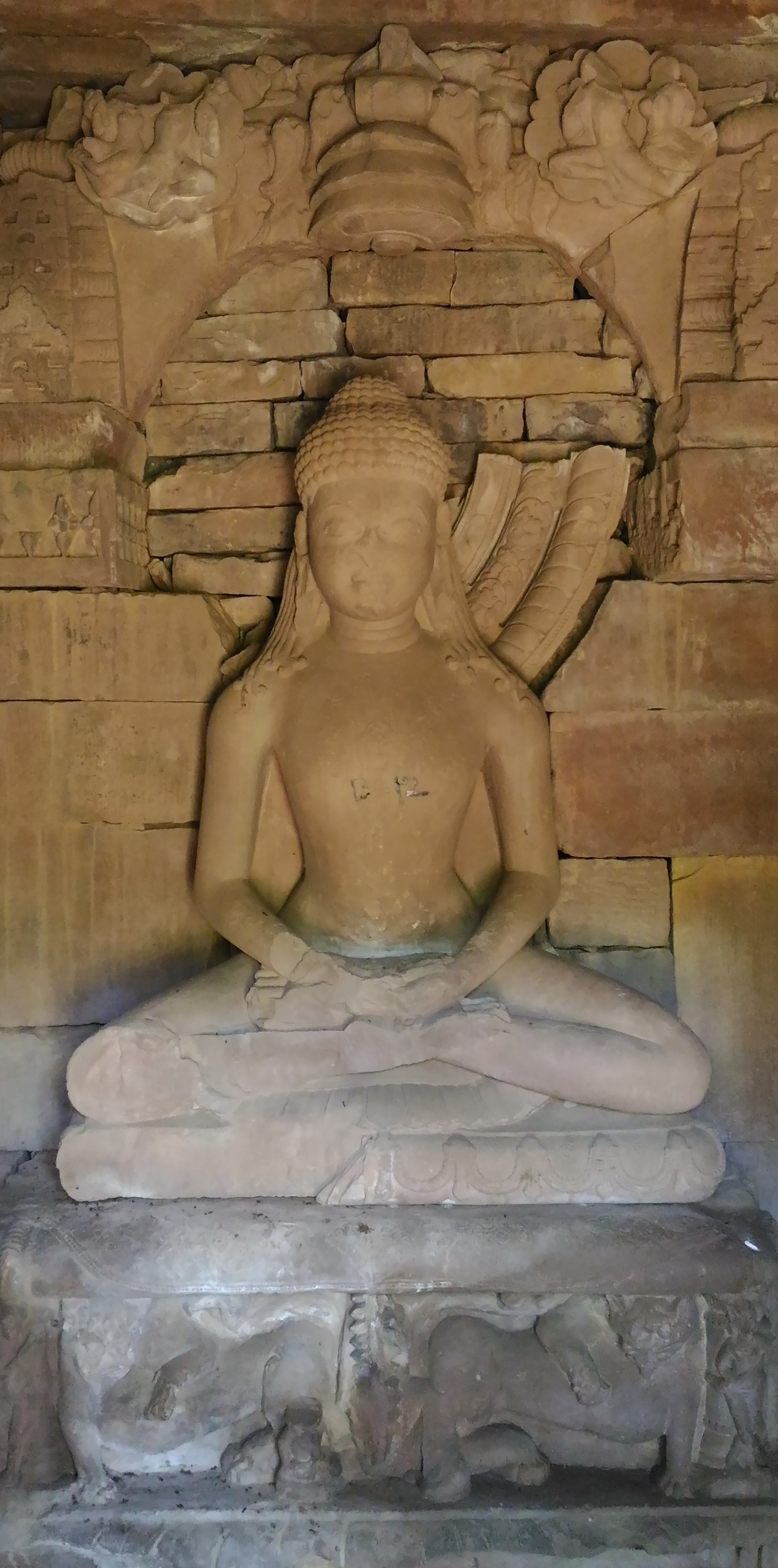
Rishabhanatha statue

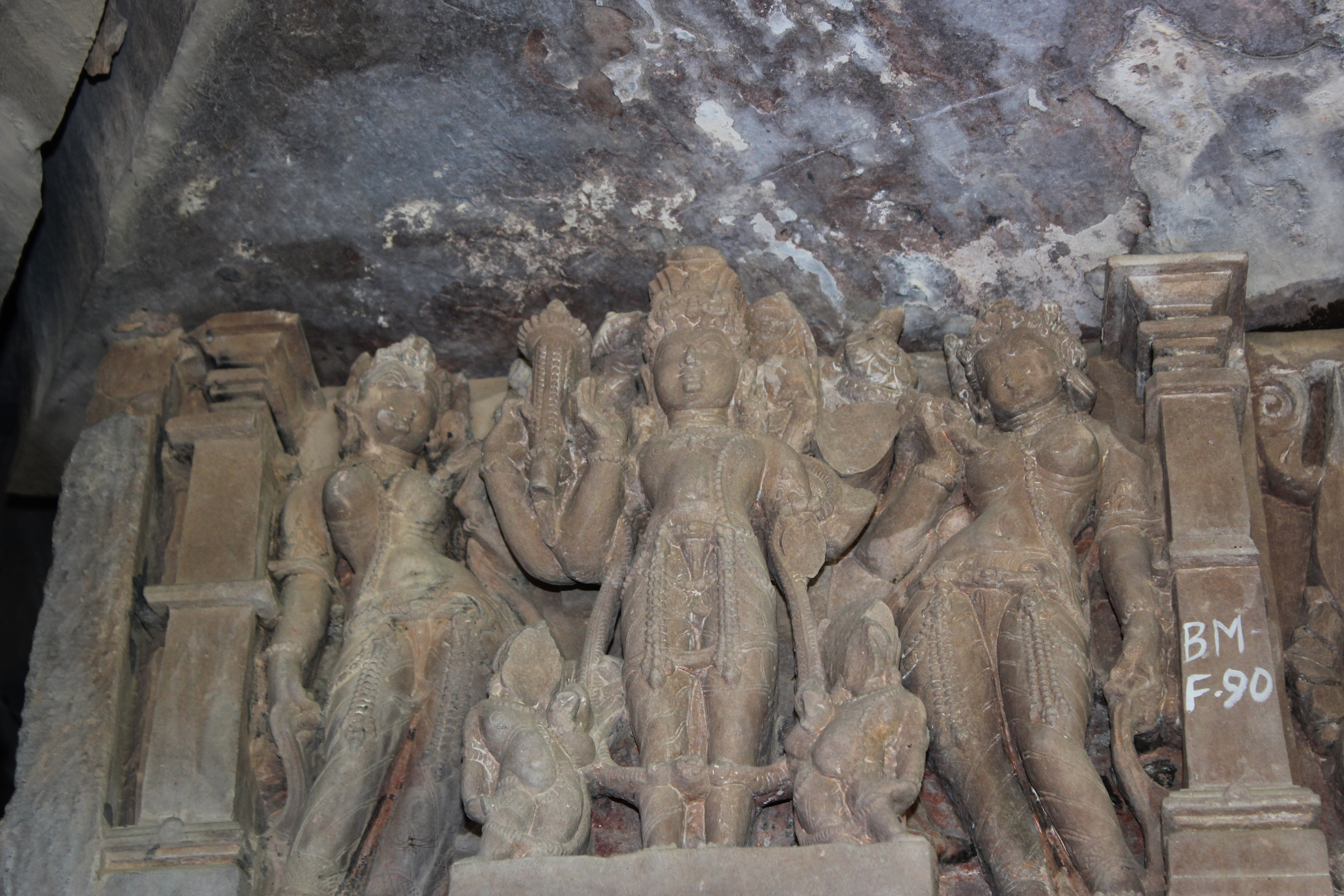
Jain statue

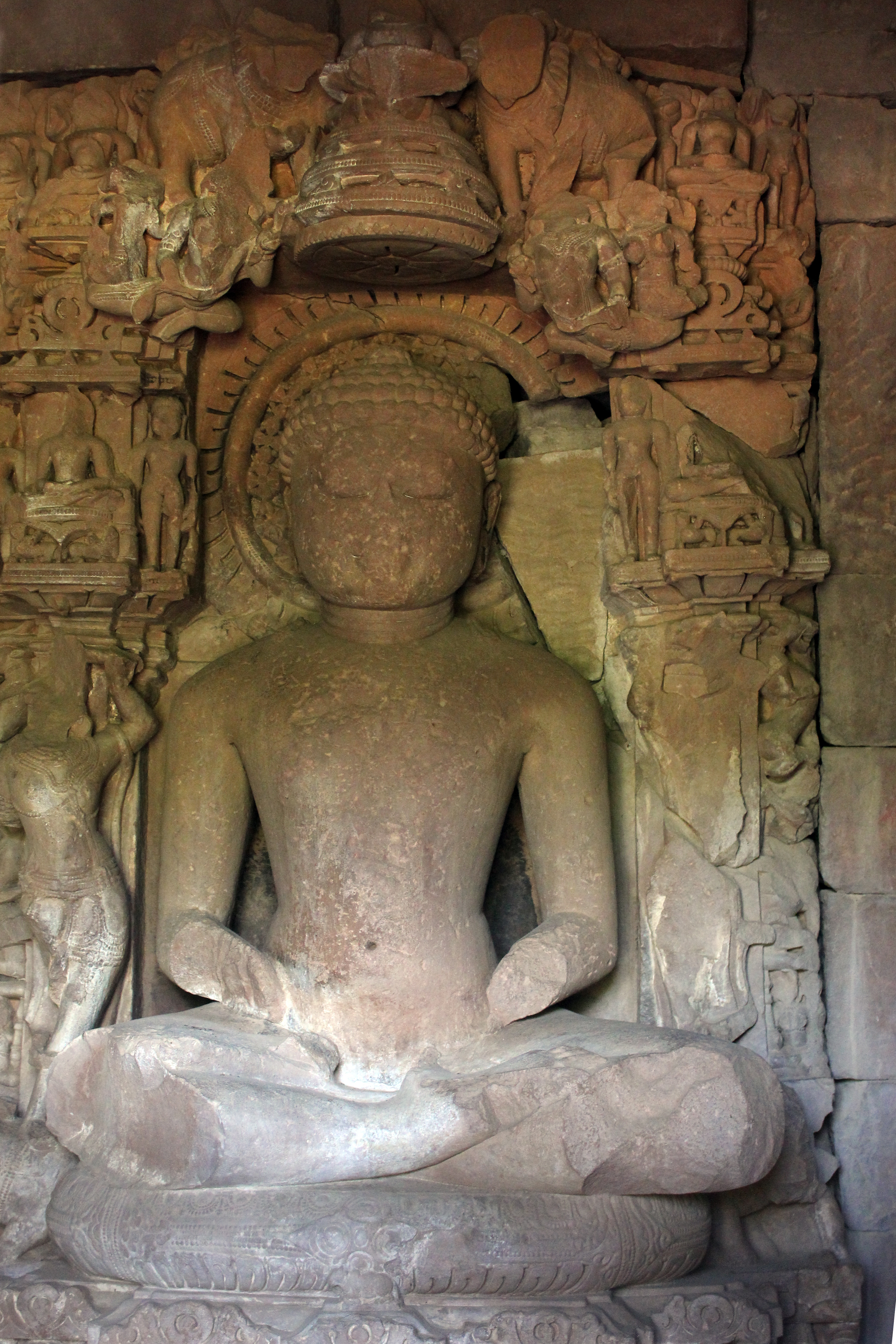
Tirthankar statue

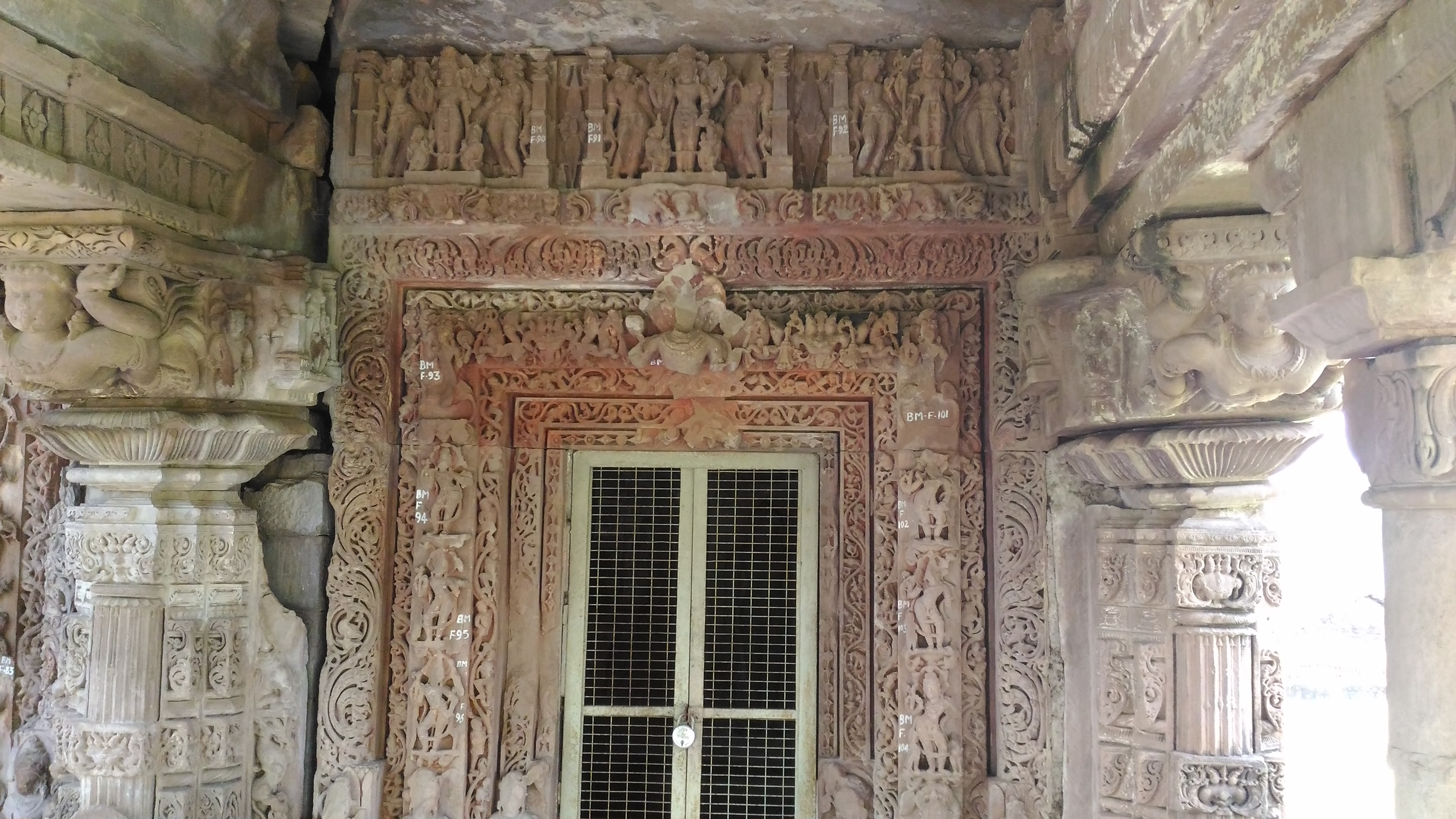
Intricately carved door

== Restoration ==
Maladevi temple in Vidisha is protected by Archaeological Survey of India.

== See also ==
- Jain temples, Vidisha
- Gadarmal Devi temple
- Maladevi Temple
- Udayagiri Caves
- Pathari Jain temples
