= Pathari Jain temples =

Group of medieval Jain temples in Madhya Pradesh, India

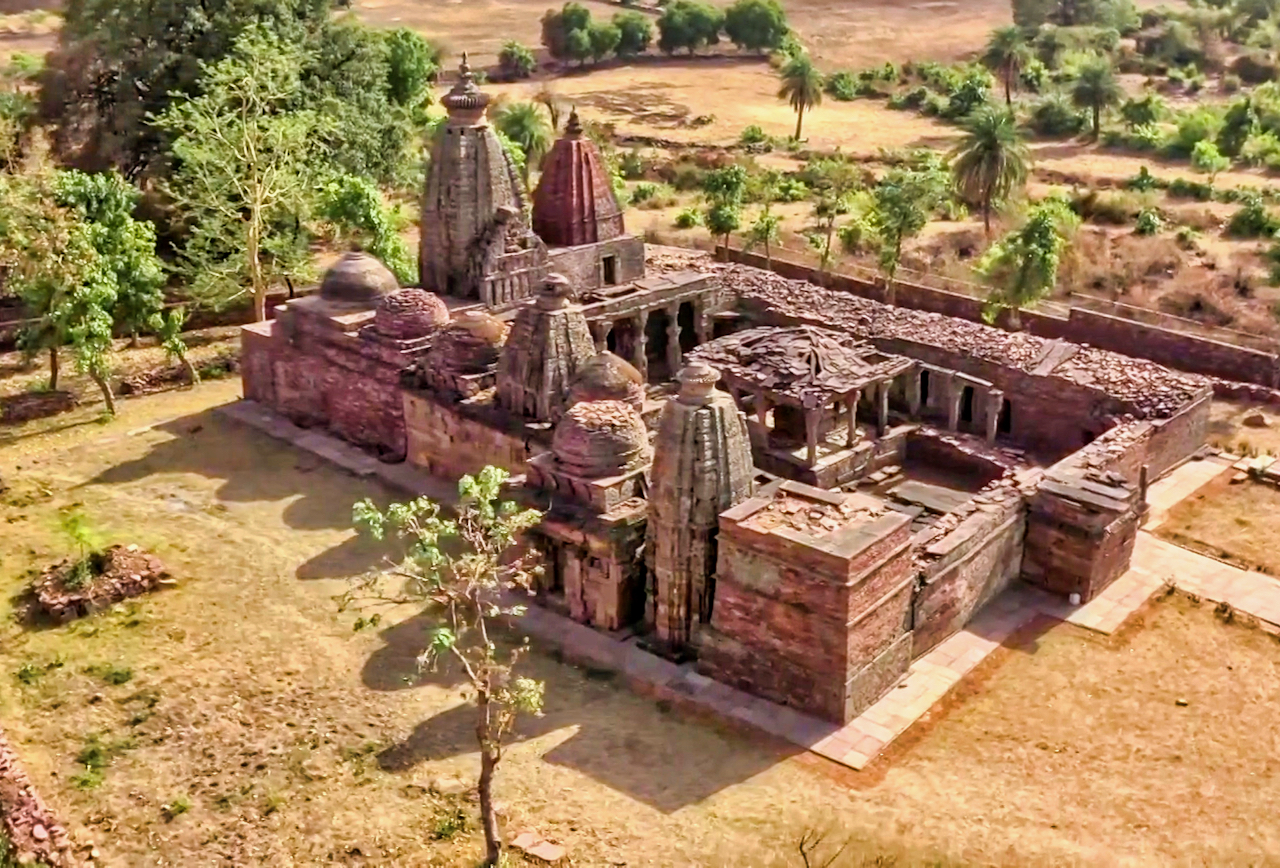
- Pathari Jain temples

Religion
- Affiliation: Jainism
- Sect: Digambara
- Deity: Tirthankars

Location
- Location: Pathari, Vidisha

Architecture
- Established: 9th century
- Temple: 25

Pathari Jain temples are a group of medieval Jain temples at Badoh, near Pathari, in Vidisha district of Madhya Pradesh, India. The temples forms part of the archaeological remains of Badoh–Pathari, a region containing monuments associated with Jain, Hindu and Buddhist.

== About temple ==
The Jain temples date from the medieval period and appear to have received patronage under the medieval dynasties including Gurjara-Pratiharas and Rashtrakuta dynasty.

The complex consists of 25 Jain temples arranged around an open courtyard, with the larger shrines placed towards the centre. The principal shrines features closely spaced shikharas. The original layout included numerous smaller cells surrounding the courtyard, along with larger temples at the center. The smaller cells were mostly flat-roofed, two-storey structures attached to the principal shrines.

Badoh–Pathari monuments including temples, water structures, pillars, caves, and sculptures from different periods.

== Sculpture ==
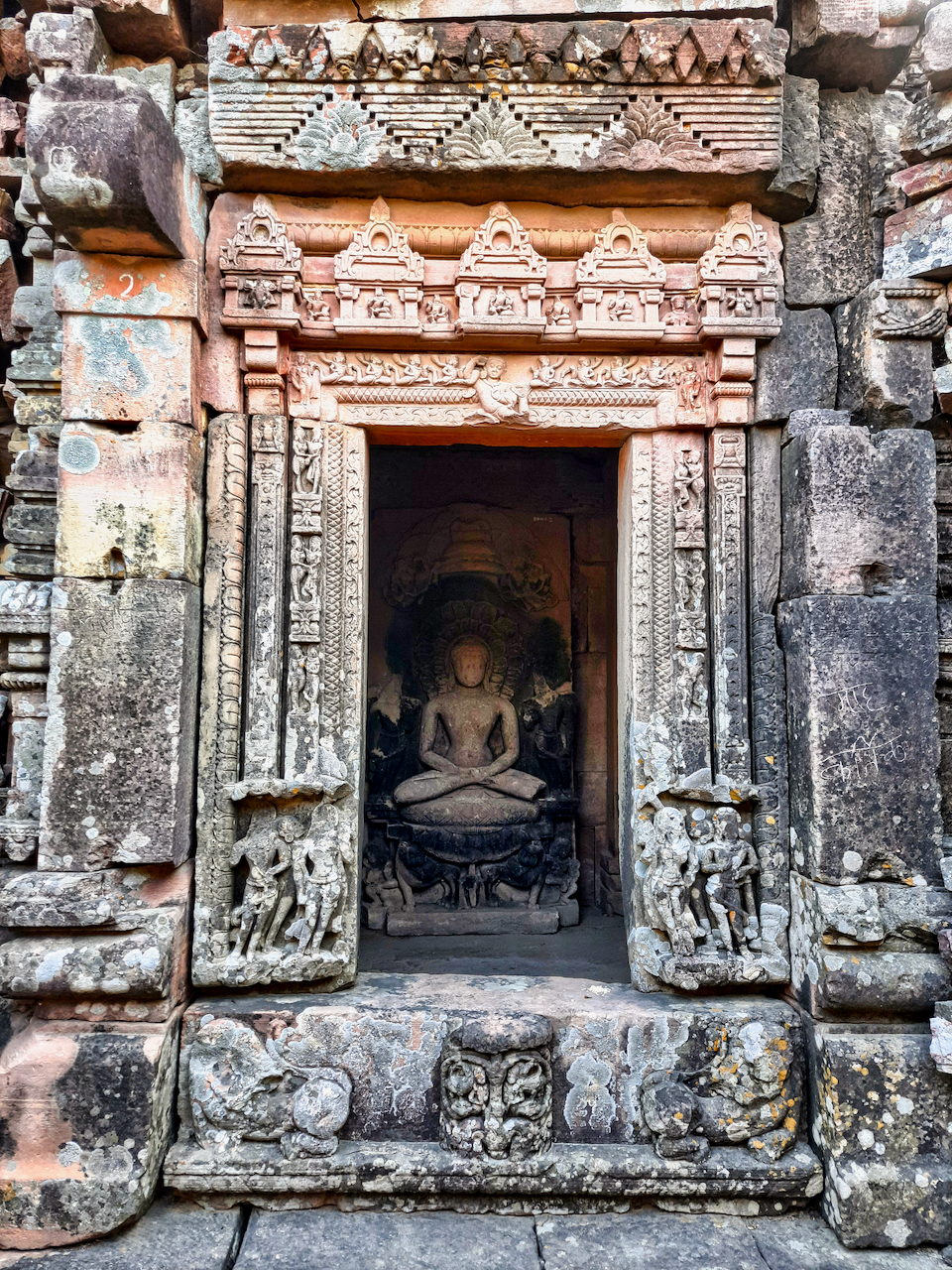
Main vedi

A substantial collection of Jain sculptures survived within the temple complex when it was documented during the 19th-century archaeological surveys. Cells contains numerous Digambara Jain images of varying dimensions.

The wider Badoh–Pathari archaeological area also preserves Jain sculptural remains outside the principal temple group. Ganjnath hill near the site feature Jain sculptures along with sculptures belonging to other religious traditions. The presence of Jain remains at both Badoh and Pathari has also been noted in scholarly studies of Jain art in Madhya Pradesh.

== Protection ==
Pathari Jain temples along with nearby temples Gadarmal temple at Badoh and the Bhimgaja and caves at Pathari are also protected by Archaeological Survey of India as Monuments of National Importance.

== See also ==
- Jain temples, Vidisha
- Gadarmal temple
- Maladevi Temple
- Bajramath Temple

== Sources ==
- Archaeological Survey of India (2025). Centrally Protected Monuments/Sites (Report). Archaeological Survey of India. p. 52.
- Cunningham, Alexander (1880). Report of a Tour in Bundelkhand and Malwa, 1871–72; and in the Central Provinces, 1873–74 (PDF). Archaeological Survey of India Reports. Government of India.
- Cousens, Henry (1894). Progress Report of the Archaeological Survey of Western India for the Months of May 1893 to April 1894 (Report). Bombay: Government Central Press.
- Ghosh, Srishti (2023). Findings of Badoh Pathari and Gyaraspur (PDF). SCITEPRESS.
- Shah, Umakant Premanand (1955). Studies in Jaina Art. Banaras: Banaras Hindu University.
