= Ishwardatt Medharthi =

- Born: 1900; Kanpur Cantonment
- Died: 1971 (aged 70–71)
- Other name: Ishvaradatt Medharthi
- Occupations: Freedom Fighter, Religious leader, anti-caste activist, writer
- Known for: Pali teacher of B. R. Ambedkar
- Notable work: Varna Vyavastha ka Bhandaphor: Varn Vyavastha Vidhvans (1933), Bharat ke Adivasi-Purvanjan aur Sant Dharm (1939)

Ishwardatt Medharthi (1900 – 1971) was an Indian religious leader, anti-caste social reformer, and independence activist. Born in a Gadariya caste Arya Samaji family, he attended the Gurukul Kangri school for 14 years. He served time in prison for participating in the Bardoli Satyagraha (1929) and the Salt March (1930). After being released from prison, he ran a school in Kanpur and wrote books criticizing the caste-based discrimination. He turned to Buddhism in the 1930s, and taught Pali language to the Dalit leader B. R. Ambedkar in the 1940s. Later, he came under the influence of the Baháʼí Faith, and returned to the Arya Samaj during his last years.

== Early life ==
Ishwardatt was born in 1900 in Kanpur Cantonment. His family belonged to the Gadaria caste, which was later classified among the Other Backward Classes. After his birth, his father Fakireram joined the British Indian army to receive education as a medical doctor, seeing it as an alternative to expensive medical colleges, which the lower caste people could not generally afford. In exchange, Fakireram had to spend 10 years in Burma, away from his family. During this time, Ishwardatt was brought up as a single child - "spoiled and pampered" - according to his biographer and disciple Bhoj Dev Mudit. His younger brothers and sisters were born after his father's return from Burma, and being considerably older than them, Ishwardatt held a very prominent position in the family.

Fakireram was a follower of Hindu reform movement Arya Samaj, which preached against caste-based discrimination. After his return from Burma, Fakireram set up a clinic in Kanpur, and was easily accepted into the Kanpur Medical Association, which was dominated by Arya Samaj members. In 1908, Fakireram admitted his son Ishwardatt to the Arya Samaj-run residential school Gurukul Kangri, and Ishwardatt stayed there for 14 years. The school combined education in natural sciences and languages with physical training, house-keeping, and social work. He was an excellent student (always coming first in his class according to Mudit), and received the name Medharthi (Sanskrit for "one who is capable of using his mental powers"). At the school, he learned English, Hindi, Sanskrit and Pali languages. He took great pride in being able to recite Sanskrit flawlessly, knowing that certain Hindu texts prohibited the study of Sanskrit for Shudras like him.

In 1922, Medharthi graduated from Gurukul Kangri, receiving the degree of Vidyalankar, which was not recognized by the colonial British government. Anticipating this situation, his father had bought land on the outskirts of Kanpur in 1915, and had set up a school, intending to appoint Medharthi as its principal. However, when Medharthi returned to Kanpur, he refused to get involved with the school, and instead worked for Ganesh Shankar Vidyarthi's newspaper Pratap in Kanpur. Two months later, he left Kanpur to attend a three-year course in Ayurveda at Calcutta. After completing his studies at Calcutta, Medharthi served as the private teacher of the sons of the ruler of Mewar for a year.

At the convocation meeting of Gurukul Kangri in 1922, the school's founder-principal Swami Shraddhanand had stressed on the importance of inter-caste marriage to destroy the caste-based discrimination. As a result, Medharthi had vowed to marry outside his caste: he kept this vow in 1928, by marrying the principal of a girls school in Indore. The marriage offended his father, ultimately leading to a court case between the father and the son. Medharthi and his wife had two children.

== Activist and teaching career ==
In 1929, Medharthi joined the Indian independence movement, participating in the Bardoli Satyagraha, for which the colonial government imprisoned him for 6 months. Immediately after his release, he joined Mahatma Gandhi's civil disobedience campaign, and lived at Gandhi's Sabarmati Ashram for some time. In 1930, he participated in the Salt March at Dandi, for which the government imprisoned him for three years.

After his release in 1933, Medharthi returned to Kanpur, and reconciled with his father. That year, he wrote a Hindi-language book Varna Vyavastha ka Bhandaphor: Varn Vyavastha Vidhvans ("The Caste System Exposed: Demolition of the Caste System"), edited by his father. The book called for abolition of the varna system; abolition of caste-specific surnames by the upper-caste Brahmins; and promotion of inter-caste marriages. He stressed that Hindus could unite and India could become a powerful nation only by abolishing social stratification. In accordance with the Arya Samaj views, Medharthi argued that the Vedas did not promote caste-based discrimination. He portrayed the original varna system as a merit-based division of labour, and attributed its discriminatory rigidities to Manu. Bodhanand Mahasthivir, who wrote a dedication, described the book as a must-read for Shudras and untouchables.

=== School ===
In 1933, Medharthi took up the charge of the school established by his father. The school was named Sri Dayanand Bharatiya Vidyalaya after Dayananda Saraswati (the founder of the Arya Samaj), and named its locality Munshipuram after Swami Shraddhanand alias Munshiram (the founder of Gurukul Kangri). Ishwardatt modeled the school after Gurukul Kangri, teaching physical education, handicraft, science, and languages to students from lower castes. It was the only school in Kanpur where lower caste students could learn Sanskrit. The school emphasized social equality, mandating students from all castes to participate in various activities. The students were addressed by their first names, and were not allowed to disclose surnames indicative of their castes.

Medharthi promoted religious universalism, believing that all religions preach non-violence, equality, and compassion. He conducted the school's' morning and evening prayers in the Arya Samaj tradition, but took prayers from Buddhism, Jainism, Christianity, and Islam, besides Arya Samaj. He called representatives of different faiths for the morning prayer service. He became attracted to the teachings of the 15th-century weaver-saint Kabir, and wrote a booklet praising Kabir's anti-Brahmin views. He invited a Muslim weaver to teach spinning to his students, thus discarding the anti-Muslim stance of the Arya Samaj. He also came under the influence of Buddhism, and named his five favorite students after the first five disciples of the Gautama Buddha.

=== Association with Buddhism ===
Swami Shraddhanand, the founder of Gurukul Kangri, did not hold Buddhism in high regard, considering its focus on non-violence as inappropriate for dealing with Muslim and colonial invaders. Nevertheless, the school had Buddhist teachers, including a Ceylonese Buddhist monk who taught Pali to Medharthi, and the Buddhist leader Anagarika Dharmapala visited the school in 1914. Such Buddhist teachers appear to have introduced Buddhism to Medharthi during his student life.

Initially, Medharthi criticized the caste system without criticizing Hinduism, and considered the Vedas to be "the mother of all religions". In 1935, he conducted the marriage of the Dalit Chamar leader Jagjivan Ram and Indrani according to the Vedic rituals. However, in the 1930s, as a result of his veneration for Kabir, he stopped revering the Vedas. Gradually, he was attracted to Buddhism, seeing it as a universal and non-discriminatory religion, although it is not clear when exactly he became a Buddhist. After turning to Buddhism, he changed the name of his school to Bharatiya Ved Vidyalaya and the name of its locality to Buddhpuri (or Buddha-puri).

In his 1939 booklet Bharat ke Adivasi-Purvanjan aur Sant Dharm ("The Primitives and Ancestors of India and the Sant Religion"), Medharthi wrote that the members of the low castes were the original inhabitants of India, and the Aryan invaders had enslaved them. According to him, these original inhabitants followed "Sant Dharm" ("the religion of saints"), the actual sanatana dharma ("eternal religion"), which was orally transmitted and preached equality, morality, and compassion. He portrayed the Vedic religion ("brahmani religion") as the oppressive religion of who had enslaved the original inhabitants of ancient India. He came up with creative etymologies to explain the Sanskrit terms such as asuras and rakshasas, used by the ancient Aryans to describe demons, claiming that these terms referred to the original inhabitants of India. For example, he claimed that "asura" referred to those who did not drink wine (sura) as opposed to the Aryans who ate meat and drank wine; and "rakshasa" referred to those who saved (raksha) others as opposed to the violent Aryans. Medharthi tried to reconcile Buddhism with the "Sant Dharm", stating that Gautama Buddha was actually a follower of the "Sant Dharm". The booklet became very popular among the Dalits of Kanpur.

=== Association with Ambedkar ===
Medharthi became acquainted with the anti-caste activist and Dalit politician B. R. Ambedkar, probably through mail correspondence, and developed a close relationship with him. He had dedicated his 1933 book to Ambedkar, describing him as a "fearless leader of the youth". He was aware of Ambedkar's burning of the Manusmriti at the Mahad Satyagraha in 1927, and like Ambedkar, blamed Manu for promoting caste-based discrimination. In the book, Medharthi noted that Ambedkar intended to convert from Hinduism to another religion, although Ambedkar publicly announced his intention to convert to another religion only two years later, in 1935, at the Yeola Conference.

He was known as an Acharya ("teacher"), and taught Ambedkar Pali, a language of several Buddhist texts. He became Ambedkar's Pali teacher when Ambedkar held the Labour portfolio in the Viceroy's Executive Council (1942–1946), and regularly visited Delhi on the weekends to teach Ambedkar.

On 5 September 1945, Ambedkar wrote a letter to the Governor of the United Provinces, asking him to appoint Medharthi as a representative of the Backward and Scheduled Castes on a 11-member committee formed to reorganize Sanskrit studies in the state.

Two European Buddhist monks - Lokanatha and Gyan Keto (alias Peter Schoenfeldt) - visited Medharthi's school, likely in 1937. Lokanatha gifted the school a brass Buddha statue, and Gyan Keto gifted it a marble one. In 1943, Ambedkar visited Medharthi's school, and donated a cement Buddha statue for its entrance.

Medharthi, along with his disciple Bhoj Dev Mudit, attended Ambedkar's conversion to Buddhism in Nagpur, on 14 October 1956.

== Later life ==
Despite being closely associated with the Dalit leader Ambedkar, Medharthi did not join the Dalit political organizations, such as Ambedkar's Scheduled Castes Federation or its successor, the Republican Party of India. He was a member of the Forward Bloc of the Indian National Congress.

Later, he turned to the Baháʼí Faith in his search for a universal religion. Towards the end of life, he returned to the Arya Samaj, posed as a Brahmin, and conducted yajnas (ritual sacrifices) in Sanskrit language.

He died in 1971: by this time, he had been largely forgotten in the Dalit circles. His Buddhpuri school had fallen into oblivion, and its Buddhist beginnings had been forgotten.
