= Gadaria people =

Herding caste of India

Gadaria
- Religions: Hinduism
- Languages: Hindi, Punjabi, Rajasthani, Bihari, Chhattisgarhi, Gujrati language, Bengali language, Gaddi language, Northern Indo-Aryan languages,
- Country: India
- Populated states: Uttar Pradesh, Punjab, Rajasthan, Haryana, Bihar, Chhattisgarh, Gujarat, West Bengal, Himachal Pradesh, Uttarakhand, and Jammu & Kashmir
- Region: North India
- Subdivisions: Nikhar and Dhangar
- Related groups: Pal; Rabari/Raika; Gaddis; Bharwad/Bharvad; Kurumba Gounder; Kurumbas

The Gadaria or Gadariya is a herding caste of North India that was traditionally involved professionally in livestock breeding, especially sheep. They are primarily found in Uttar Pradesh and in some parts of Punjab, Haryana, Uttarakhand, Himachal Pradesh, Jammu & Kashmir, Rajasthan, Madhya Pradesh and Bihar

== Etymology ==
Gadariya is a compound on of Gadar and ya. Gadar is a Prakrit word which means sheep and the suffix ya makes it pertaining to the community of shepherds. Sanskrit gandhāra, a sheep, the Sanskrit name being taken from the country of Gandhara or Kandahar, from which sheep were first brought. Some scholars hold that the words Gadar and Arya formed Gadararya or Gadarya. Possibly it later became a derivative of Gadariya. There is also a view that they were Aryas and the custodians or defenders of Garh (fort) and hence were called Gadariyas.

== Origin ==
This caste finds its earliest related mention as the ancient Gändharas, as stated in the Mahabharata and Rig veda, were well-known blanket-makers. Evidently, the Gandharas were shepherd by profession. It might be suggested that the Gadariya caste has its origin in the Gändhäras. They are believed to be amongst the earliest settlers in the Nerbudda valley, for which they have given their name to several places, such as Gadariakheda and Gädarwāra. The Gadarmal devi temple was built around 7 - 8 century A.D. (Approx 1400 years ago) in present day Vidisha, Madhya Pradesh by a Gadaria (shepherd).

Panini, the great grammarian (5th century B.C.) in his book Astādhyāyi named Brahmour as Gabdika and their residents as Gabdik. The territory is also named Gaderan or Gaddiyar, the country of the Gadariyas.

== History ==
In the early 1910s, an educated class of Gadarias formed All India Pal Kshatriya Mahasabha. There were debates within the community whether to add Kshatriya suffix to the community name. In the 1930s, they started referring to themselves as "Pali Rajput", a synonym of Pal Kshatriya. They started caste magazines like "Pal Kshatriya Samachar" and "Shepherd Times". Later the community went through the process of De-Sanskritisation and dropped the suffix Kshatriya. Among the reasons cited for de-sanskritization were losing autonomy of their caste identity and avoiding being submerged into the identity of high castes.

== Sub-castes and clans ==
There are two major subdivisions amongst Gadarias, namely Dhangar and Nikhar. They share the same gotras such as Chauhan, Parihar, Sisodiya, Shirashwar, Chandel, Mohania, Kula etc are some of the gotras amongst them.

== Notables ==
Religion and Temples

Gadarmal Devi Temple, is a Hindu and Jain temple built around 7 - 8 century A.D. (Approximately 1400 years ago) in present day Vidisha, Madhya Pradesh by a person of Gadaria caste (shepherd).

Baidyanath Temple, In the legend of Baidyanath Temple, Lord Vishnu took the form of a shepherd from the Gadariya caste, known as Baiju Gadariya. When Ravana was carrying the Shivalinga to Lanka, he needed to relieve himself.He handed the linga to Baiju Gadariya, who placed it on the ground. As a result, the linga got permanently rooted at Deoghar. This site became the famous Baidyanath Jyotirlinga, worshipped to this day.

Kingdom’s and Dynasties

Holkar Dynasty, The Holkars were the ruling house of the Indore State of the Maratha Confederacy, they belonged to the Gadaria caste.

Rulers, chieftains, and warriors

Mahraja Shri. Malhar Rao Holkar: Founder of the Holkar dynasty; a leading Maratha general under Peshwa Baji Rao I; established Holkar rule in the Malwa region.

Rajmata/Maharani Ahilyabai Holkar: One of the greatest female rulers in Indian history; known for wise and just administration, promoting trade, building roads, tanks, and temples across India, including the Kashi Vishwanath and Somnath temples.

Maharja Shri. Yashwantrao Holkar: Had fought against Britishers during the time of Lord Wellesly and he did not allow them to succeed in their attempt to annex Hindu Kingdoms. It was Holkar alone who successfully faced them for this he was also called the "Napoleon of India" and "First freedom fighter"; resisted British expansion; won battles against the British and tried to unite Indian rulers against colonial rule.

Social Reformer and Freedom Fighter

Ishwardatt Medhrathi, was a freedom fighter, Hindi writer, and social reformer from Uttar Pradesh. He belonged to the Gadariya (Gareria) caste and worked for the upliftment of backward and marginalized communities. He earned the surname "Medharthi" for being the most brilliant student in his school, and used literature and activism to fight caste discrimination and British rule.

== Classification ==
They are classified as Other Backward Class in the Indian System of Reservation.

== Demographics and Distribution ==
Uttar Pradesh

The Gadariya caste is spread all over the Uttar Pradesh. The community forms 4.4 percent of entire Uttar Pradesh state population.

Gujarat

The Gadaria caste formed 2% of the total population of Gujarat. They are recorded to be the richest caste in Palanpur, Gujarat

== Religion ==
They generally practice Hinduism, worshipping various popular deities including Rama, Krishna, Shiva, Vishnu, Hanuman, Kali, Chandi and Lakshmi, as well as various Kuladevata, or family deities. Some of them wear the sacred thread. A majority of them are vegetarians.
