= Gyaraspur =

- Town
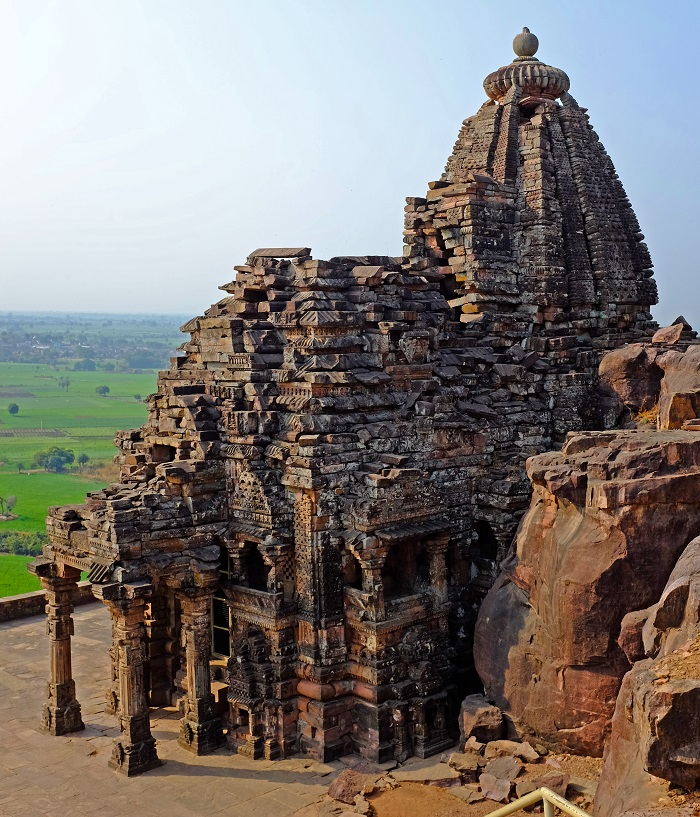
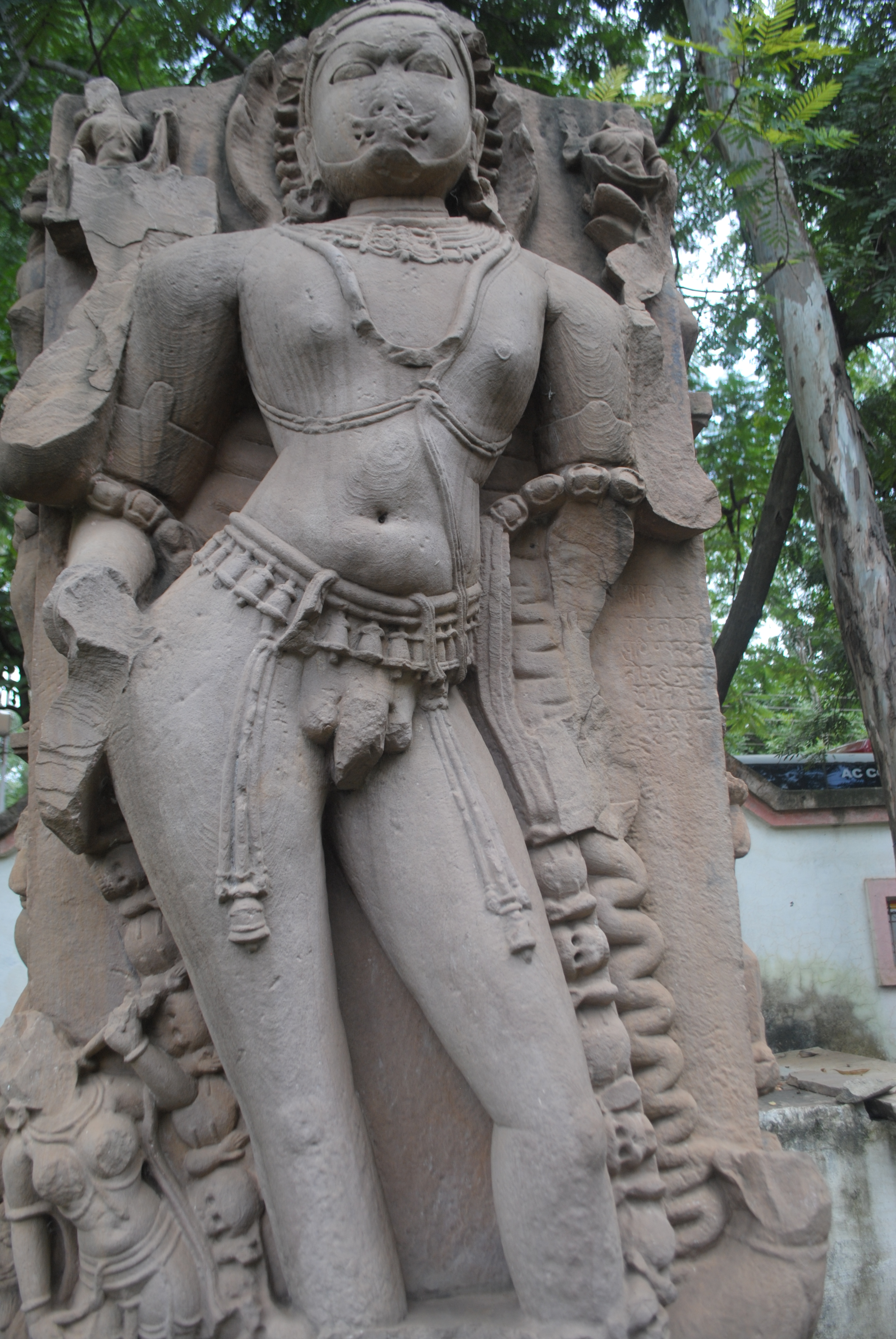
- Maladevi Temple A Bhairavnath sculpture from Gyaraspur (dated to 9-10th century)

- Location in Madhya Pradesh, India
- Coordinates: 23°40′N 78°6′E
- Country: India
- State: Madhya Pradesh
- District: Vidisha
- Block: Gyaraspur

Area
  - Total: 11 km^{2} (4.2 sq mi)
  - Water: 2.7 km^{2} (1.0 sq mi)

Population
  - Total: 7,000
  - Density: 640/km^{2} (1,600/sq mi)
- Time zone: UTC+5:30 (IST)
- PIN: 466661

Gyaraspur is a town in the Vidisha district, Madhya Pradesh, India. It is also the headquarters of a tehsil of the same name.

== History ==
Gyaraspur was of considerable importance in medieval India. The place has several ruins of several old Hindu, Jain and Buddhist places of worship. These include Maladevi Temple, Hindola Torna and the Bajramath Surya Temple.

== Demographics ==
As per Census of India 2011 Gyaraspur town has population of 6,271 of which 3,242 are males while 3,029 are females. Total 1,354 families residing in the town.

== Administration ==
Gyaraspur is a Tehsil headquarter and total 117 villages in the tehsil. A Police Station and a Community Hospital is in the tehsil.

== Transport ==
Gyaraspur is located near Vidisha (38 km) and Sanchi (48km). Udaipura, famous for its heritage temples, can be reached via Gulabganj and basoda.

== Topography ==
Gyaraspur lies in a gorge of some low steep hills, at distance of about 38.4 km north-east from the district headquarters town Vidisha. The place is situated on the old highway road Bhopal to Sagar. Buses ply on the road.

== Sites ==
The extensive ruins, scattered in and around the Tehsil, narrate the story of glory that was Gyaraspur in the late ancient and early medieval times. These ruins indicate that the place has passed through the influence of Buddhism, Brahmanism and Jainism.

Some key sites include:

1. Maladevi Temple (Jain): This temple is quite picturesquely situated on the slope of a hill overlooking the valley. Located on a huge platform cut out of the hillside and strengthened by a massive retaining wall, Maladevi temple is in fact imposing and stupendous building. It comprise an entrance-porch, a hall and a shrine surrounded by a circumambulatory passage and crowned with a lofty Shikara all covered with rich carving. Though now Jain images occupy the shrine room and hall, a figure of a goddess occupying the dedicatory block on the outer door frame and other decorative sculptures probably indicate that the temple was originally dedicated to some hindu goddess and it was subsequently appropriated by the Jains.
2. Hindola Torna: It is one of the 'Toranas' or ornamental entrance arches leading to a large temple either of Vishnu or of Trimurti. Hindola means a swing, and this tarana with its two upright pillars and cross-beam has a truly connotative name. All the four sides of the two lofty pillars are carved into panels with insets of the ten incarnations of Vishnu.
3. Bajramath Temple (Jain): The bajramath is a fine example of a very rare class of temples with three shrines or cells placed abreast. All these shrines now occupied by Jain idols belonging to the Digambara sect. More precisely the central shrine was dedicated to Surya, the southern to Vishnu and the northern to Siva. The carving of the doorway is exceptionally fine and vigorous. The Shikara of the temple is unusual in its plan and design.
4. Dekhinath / Dhaikinath stupa (Buddhist), a Buddhist stupa. It is found to the west of Gyaraspur. It was in ruins and was partially restored. It stands on a large platform and has four niches which had a Buddha statue in each but now stand empty. The damaged statues are now at an ASI storage room for this site. The stupa is a hemispherical dome of about 10 meter diameter, standing on a 2.75 high platform (berm) with cardinal projections .A Buddhist inscription in a 9th to 10th century script found here helps date the site. This is notable as it is further confirmation that Buddhism was thriving in north Madhya Pradesh at around the 10th century.
5. Athakamba Temple, a 9th century Shaiva temple

== Gallery ==
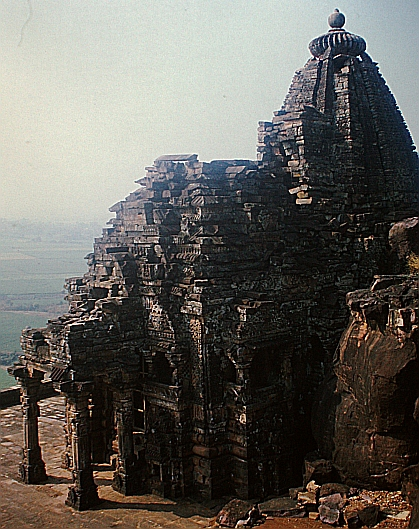
Maladevi Temple

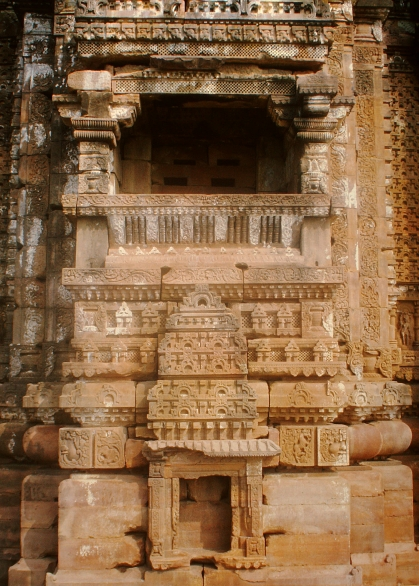
Maladevi Temple

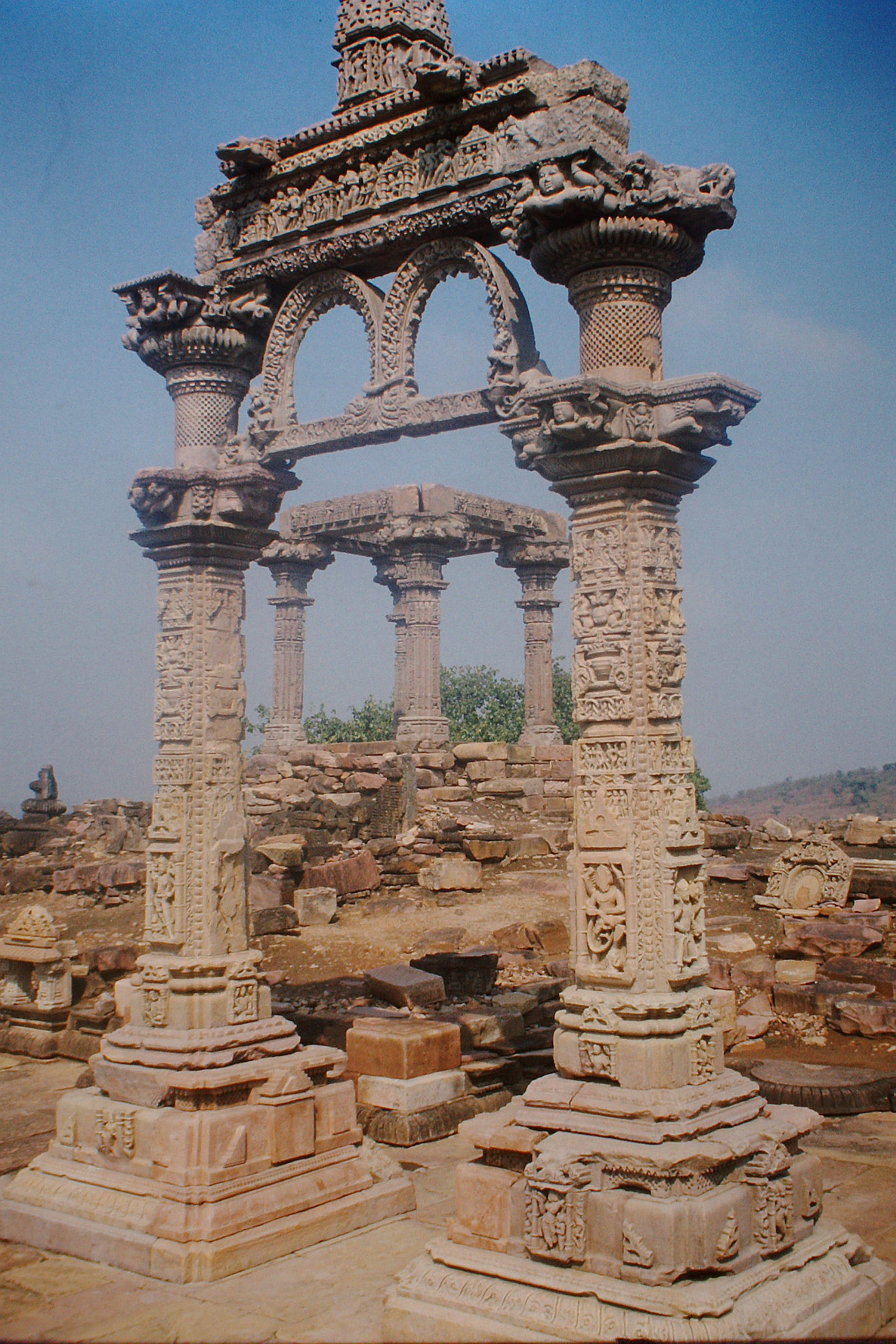
Hindola Torana

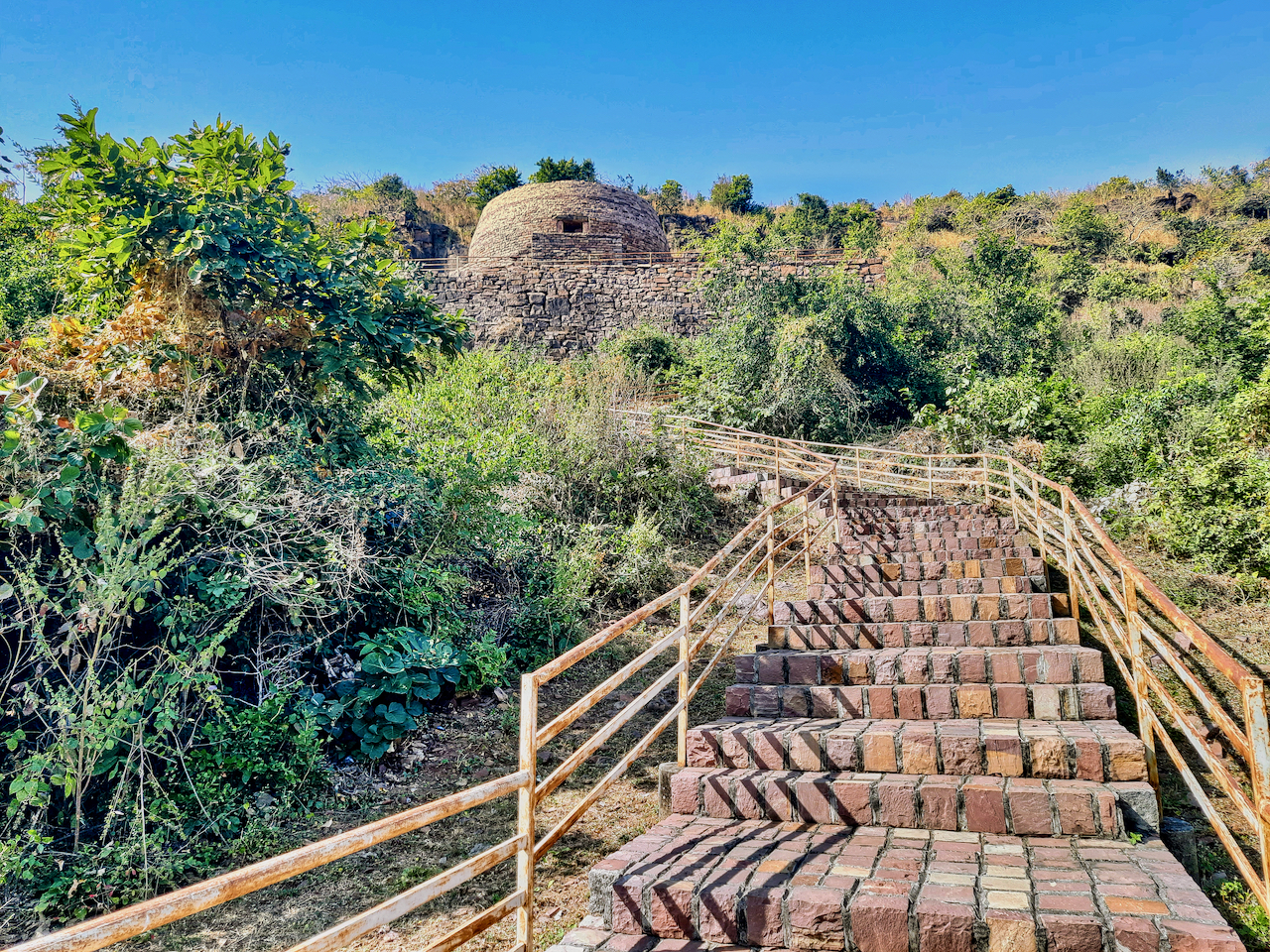
Path to the Dhaikinath Stupa

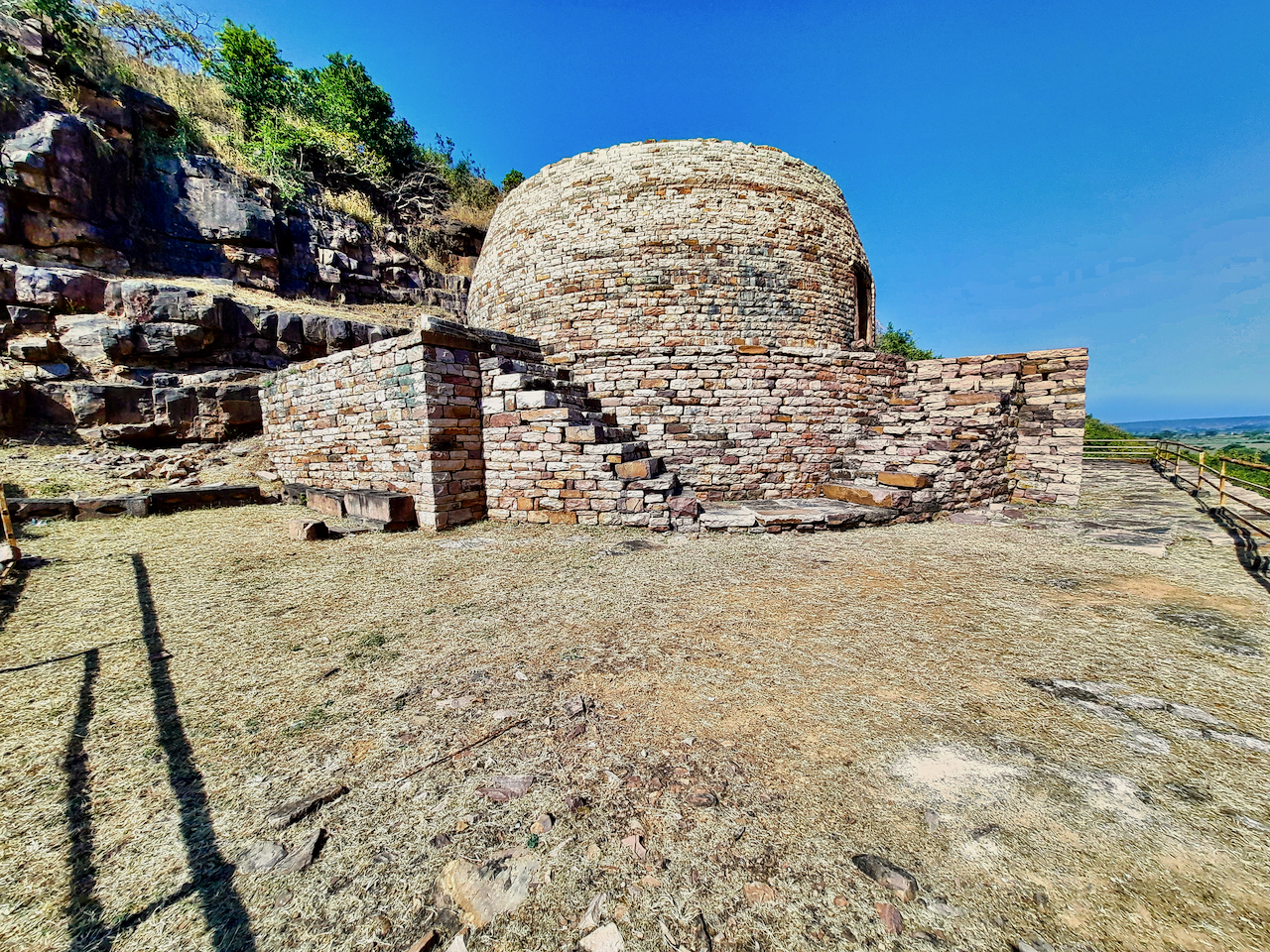
Dhaikinath Buddhist Stupa

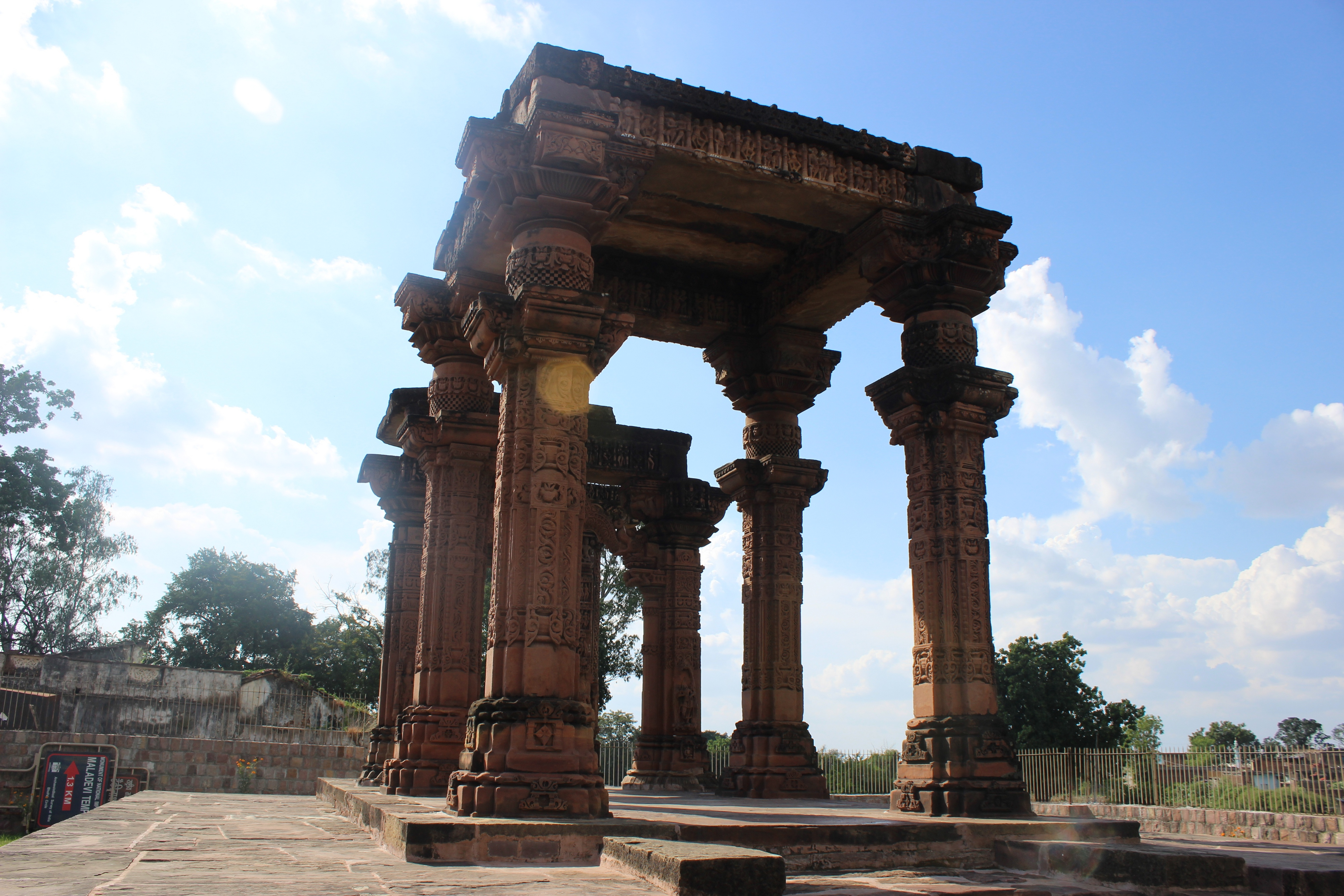
Athakamba Temple

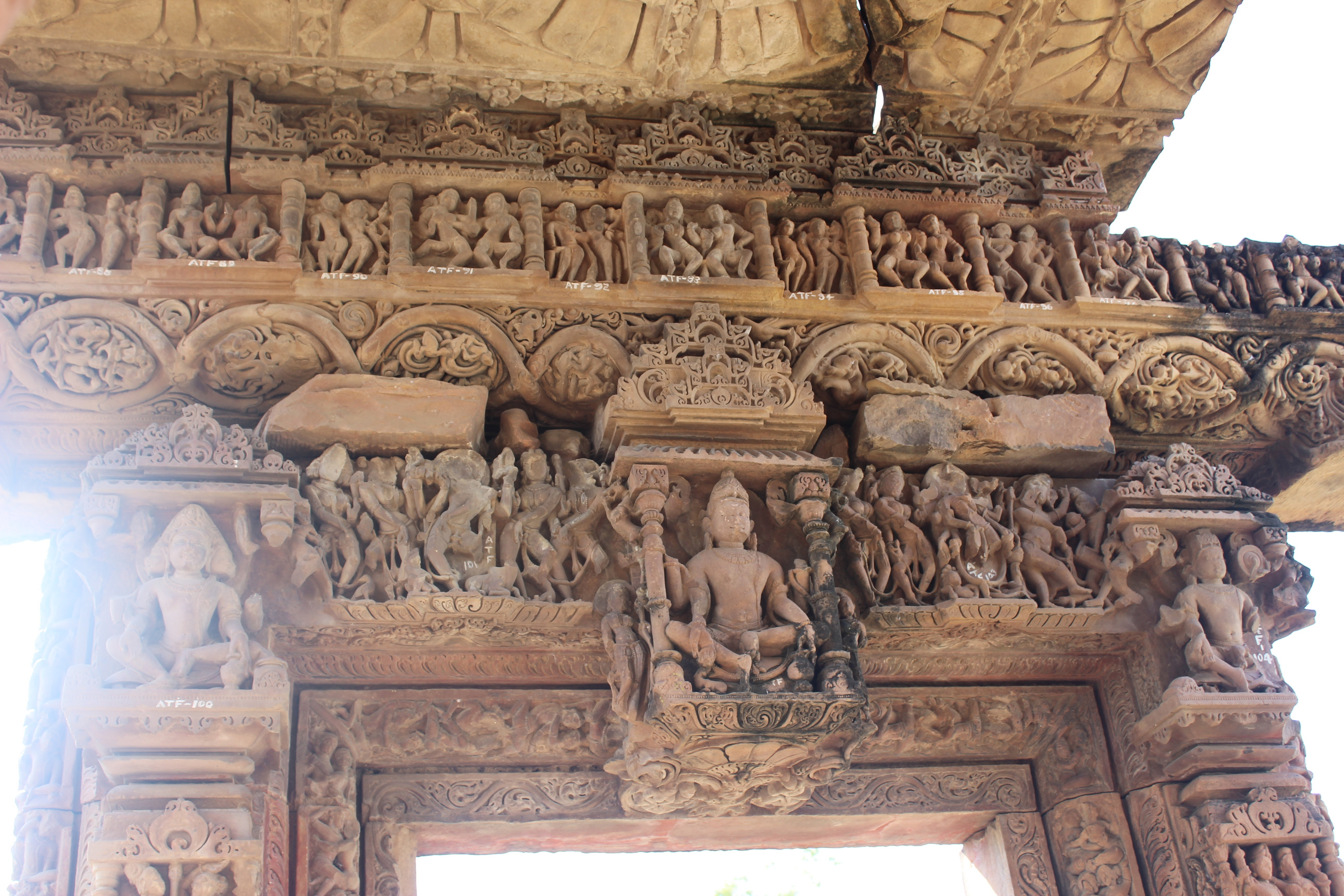
Athakamba Temple

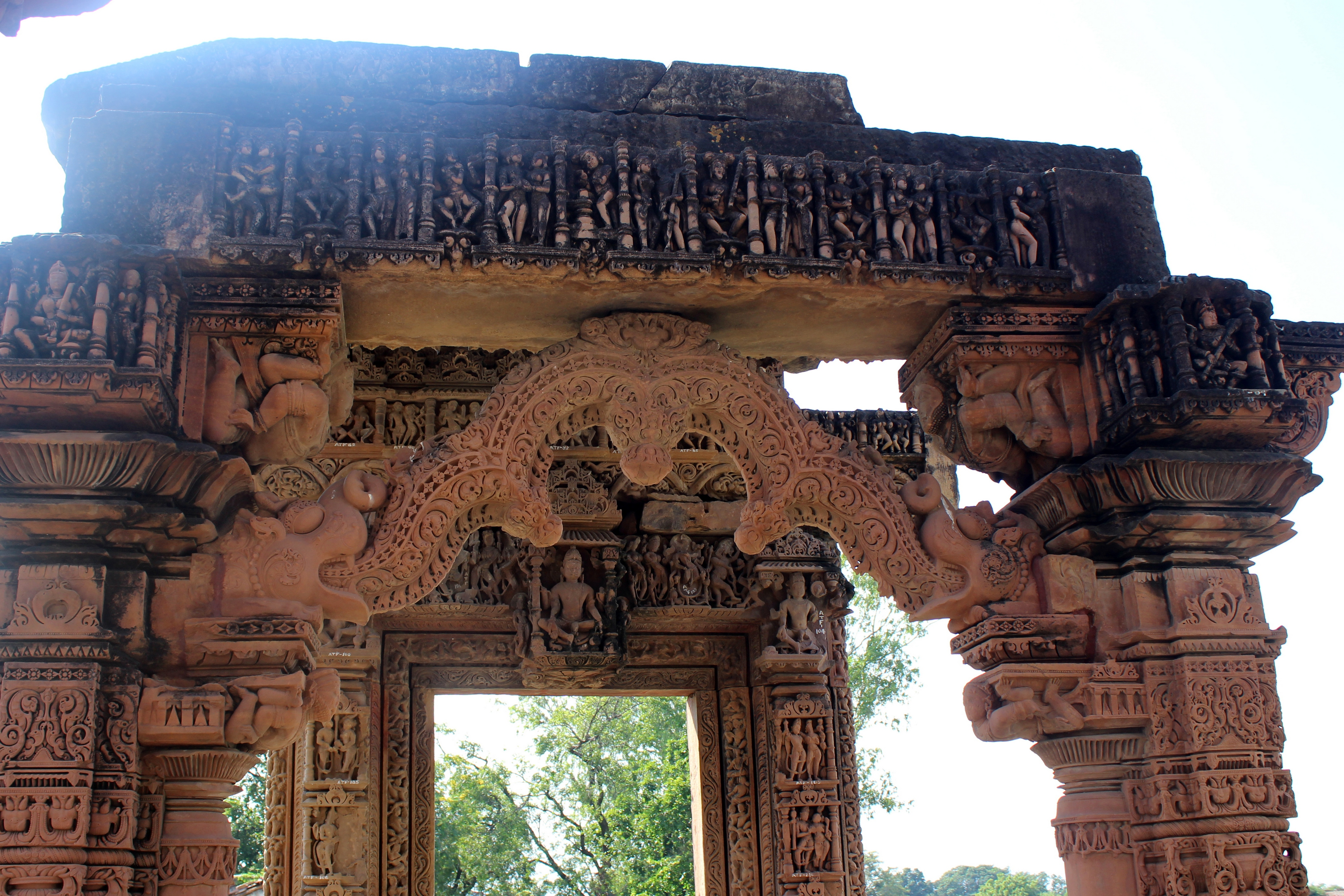
Athakamba Temple
