= Jain temples, Vidisha =

Temples and archaeological site

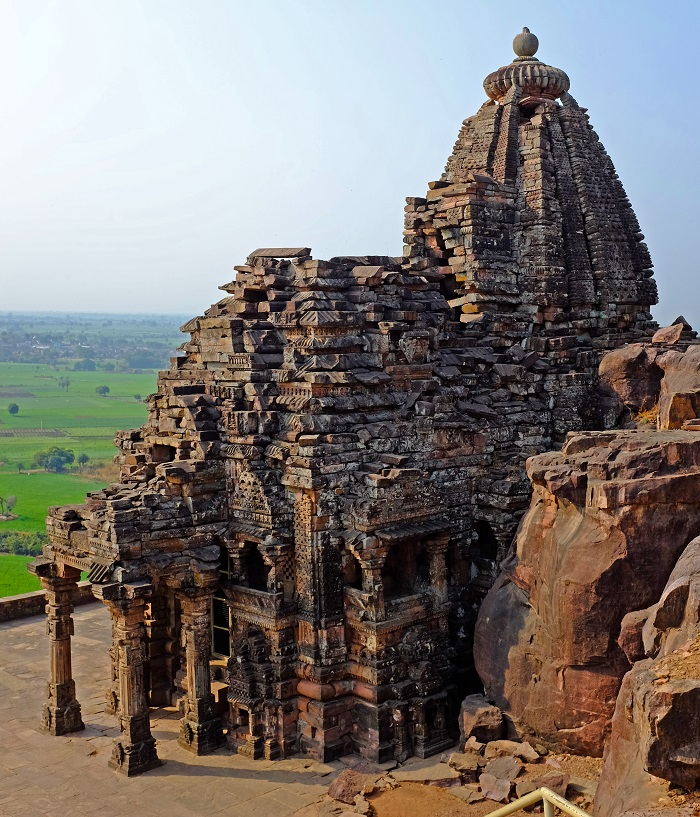
- Maladevi temple

Religion
- Affiliation: Jainism
- Deity: Tirthankar
- Festival: Mahavir Jayanti

Location
- Location: Vidisha, Madhya Pradesh
- Interactive map of Jain temples, Vidisha
- Coordinates: 23°39′32.1″N 78°06′49.1″E

Architecture
- Style: Gupta, Māru-Gurjara, Mughal
- Creator: Gupta, Pratihara dynasty
- Established: 4th to 5th century
- Completed: 10th century
- Temple: 14 + 1 cave

Vidisha is considered to be Puranakshetras Jain tirtha. The Jain temples are located in Vidisha district in state of Madhya Pradesh, India. According to Jain belief, Vidisha is the birthplace of Shitalanatha, the tenth tirthankar. Here the first 108 feet elevated temple with all Tirthankaras with Shitalanatha as the principal deity is under construction.

== Jain cave ==
According to Jain belief, Vidisha is one of the first places where the Jain images were worshipped. The earliest of these are two Jain caves of Udayagiri. Only a torso remains of one cave, and this torso is now exhibited in an open-air museum.

Cave 20 is the only cave in the Udayagiri Caves complex is dedicated to Jainism. It is on the northwestern edge of the hills. At the entrance is the image of the Jain Tirthankara Parshvanatha sitting under a serpent hood. The cave is divided into five rectangular rooms with stones stacked, the total length of 50 feet (15 m) that is about 16 feet (4.9 m) deep.

== Jain temples ==
=== Bada Mandir ===
Bada Mandir is one of the fourteen modern Jain temples present in Vidisha town. The temple is built in Mughal architecture. The bada mandir consists of a miraculous Jain idol which is considered to be older than the temple.

=== Bajramath Jain temple ===
Bajramath Jain temple is situated in Gyaraspur and dates back to the 9th century. This temple enshrines three garbhagrihas with the temple is fully decorated with Jain sculptures. The temple was earlier a Brahmical temple dedicate to Surya but was transformed to a Jain temple. All three shrines of this temple are now occupied with idols of tirthankaras.

=== Maladevi temple ===
Maladevi temple dates back to the 9th century. This is a rock-cut temple built in Pratihara style. The temple was initially a Brahmical temple but later converted to a Jain worship site. The temple is dedicated to Adinatha. The Maladevi temple is considered one of the best examples of its collection of varied Jain sculptures.

=== Gadarmal Devi temple ===
Gadarmal Devi temple dates back to the 9th century. The architecture of this yogini temple is a fusion of Pratihara and Parmara styles. It is built similar to Teli ka Mandir in Gwalior fort. This temple houses both Hindu and Jain idols. The temple is made of sandstone with seven small shrines surrounding the main shrine.

=== Pathari Jain temples ===
Pataria Jain temples was built in the 9th century in Badoh city. These are a cluster of 25 temples with the main shrine surmounted with shikharas; the other shrines have a flat roof, shikharas, and dome.

== Restoration ==
In 1930, Gwalior state stepped up to conserve Maladevi temple. All of the monuments in Vidisha are protected by Archaeological Survey of India.

== Gallery ==
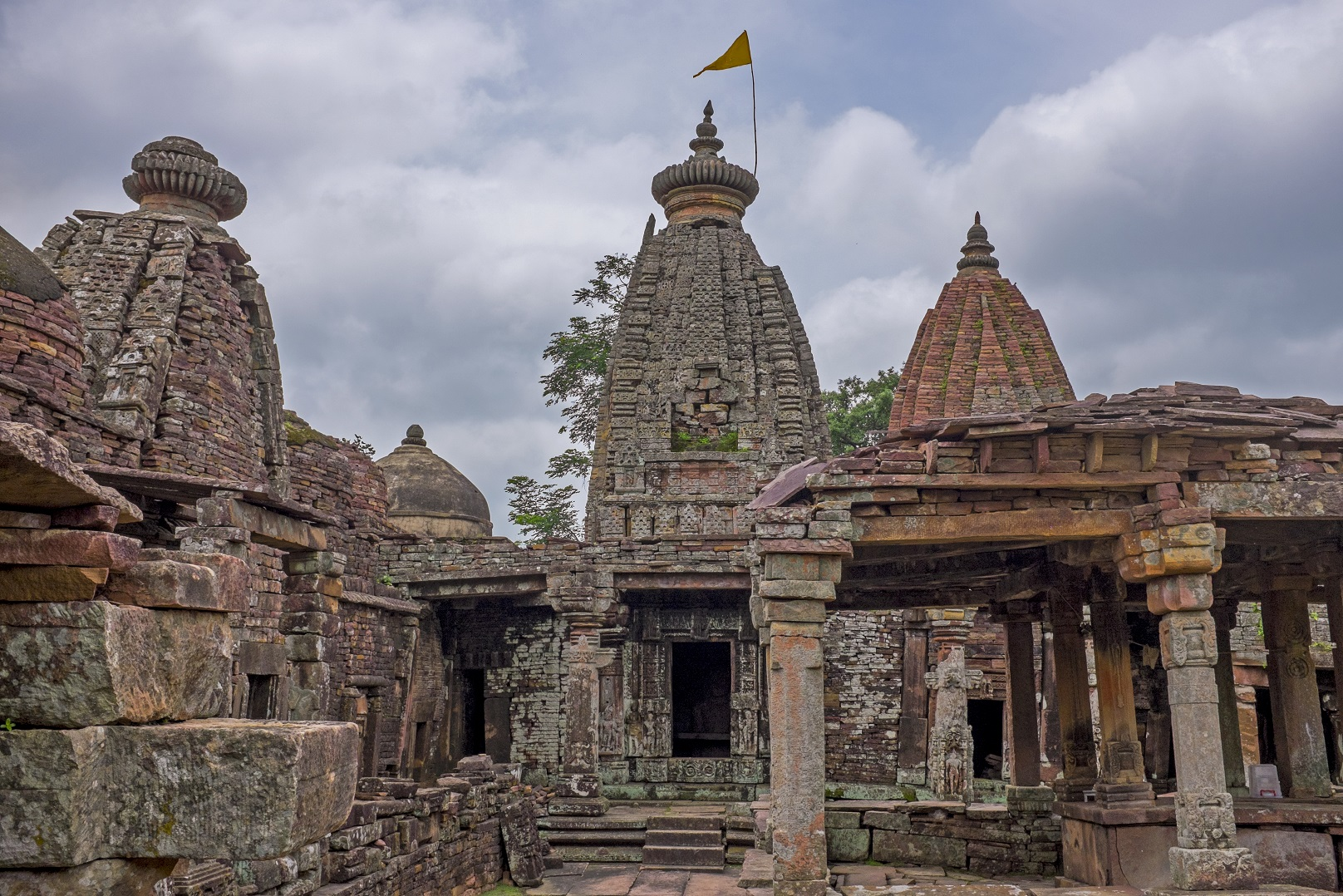
Pataria Jain temple

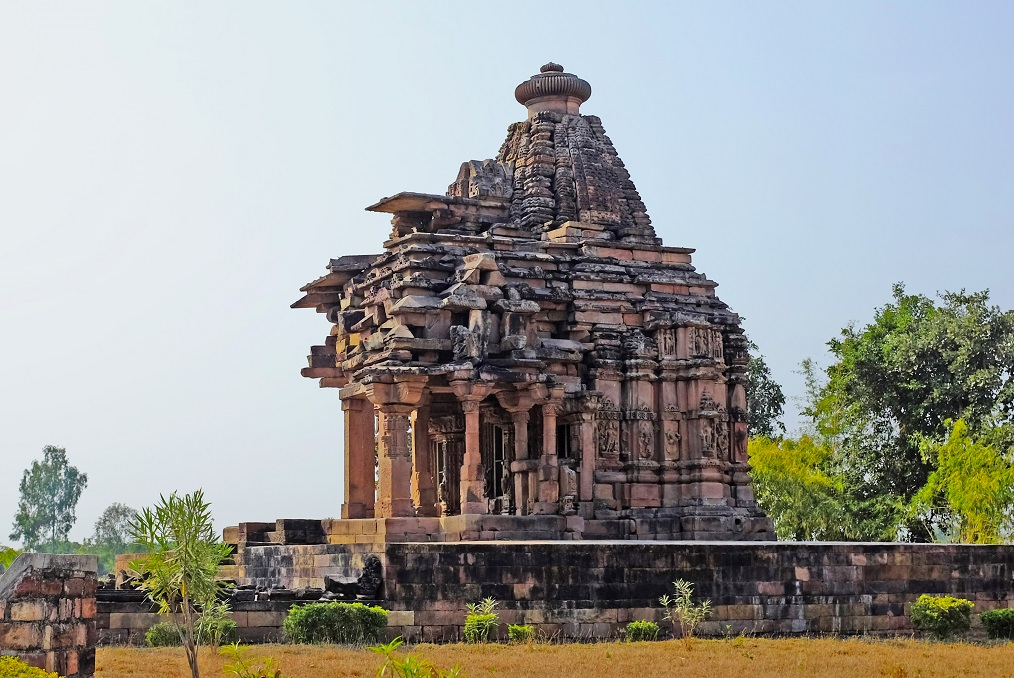
Bajramath Jain temple

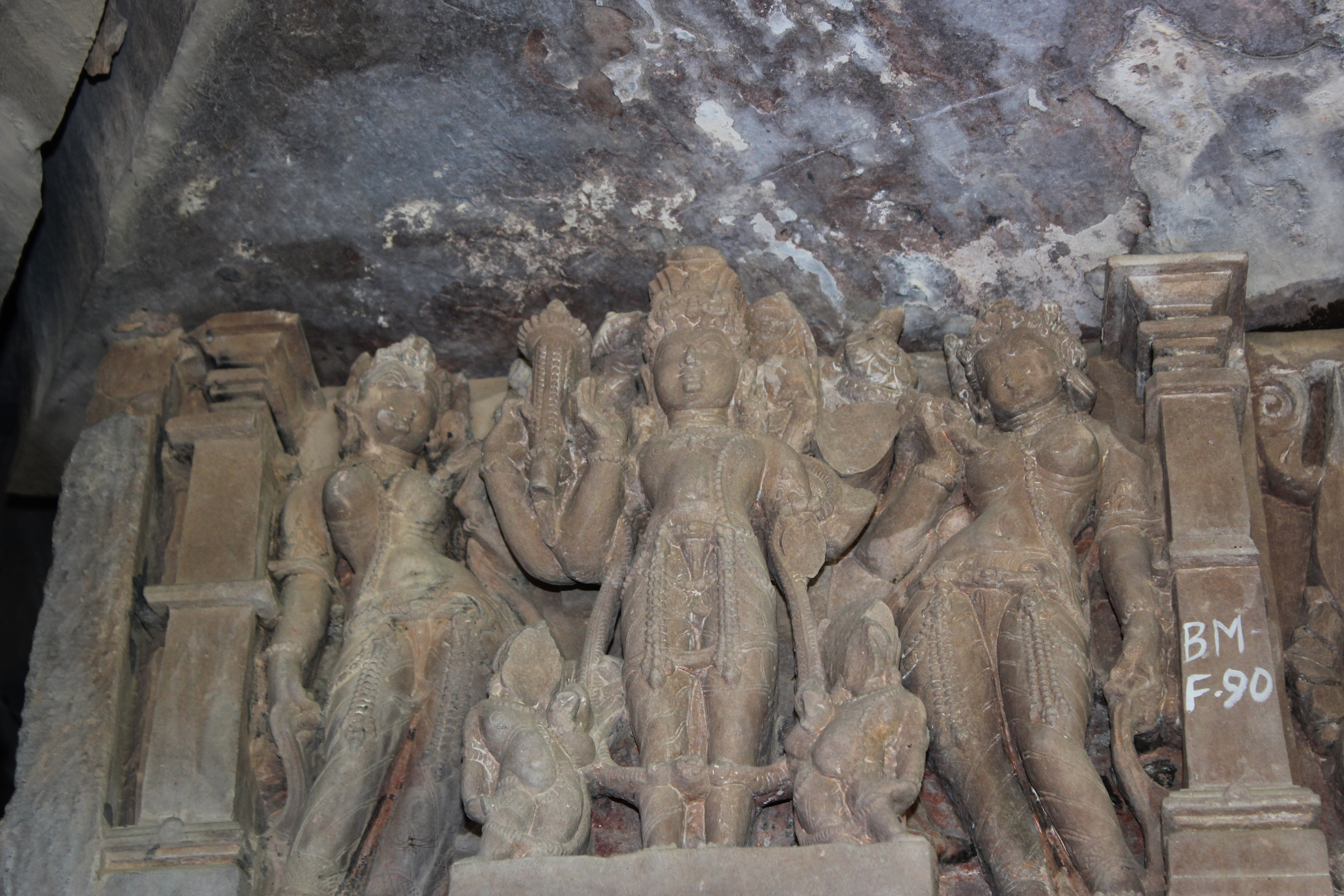
Carvings of Vishnu on wall of Bajramath Jain temple

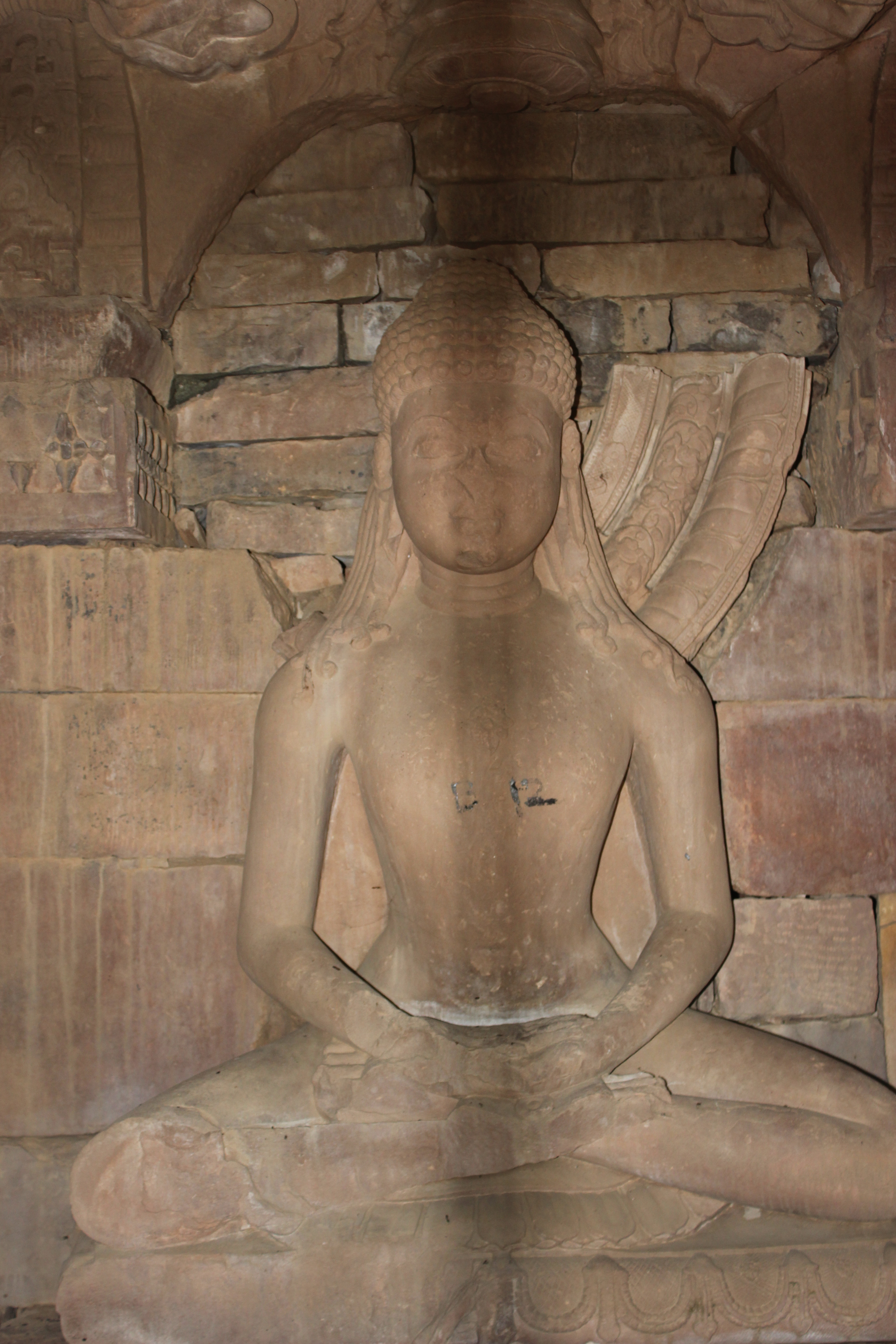
Image of Adinatha inside Bajramath Jain temple

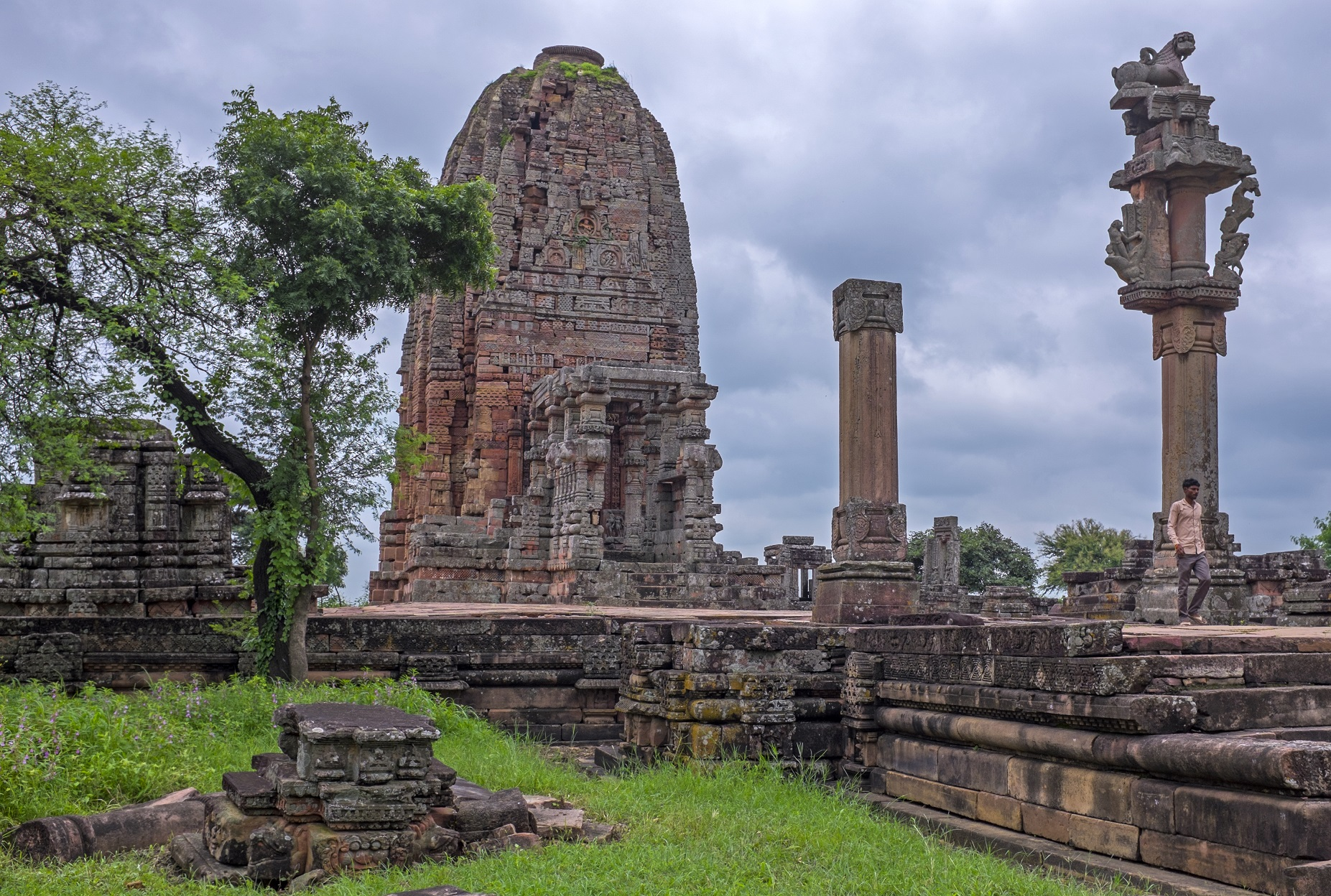
Gadarmal Devi temple

== See also ==
- Siddhachal Caves
- Gwalior fort
- Vidisha
- Beejamandal
- Sironj
