= Gadarmal Devi Temple =

Hindu Yogini temple in India

Gadarmal temple
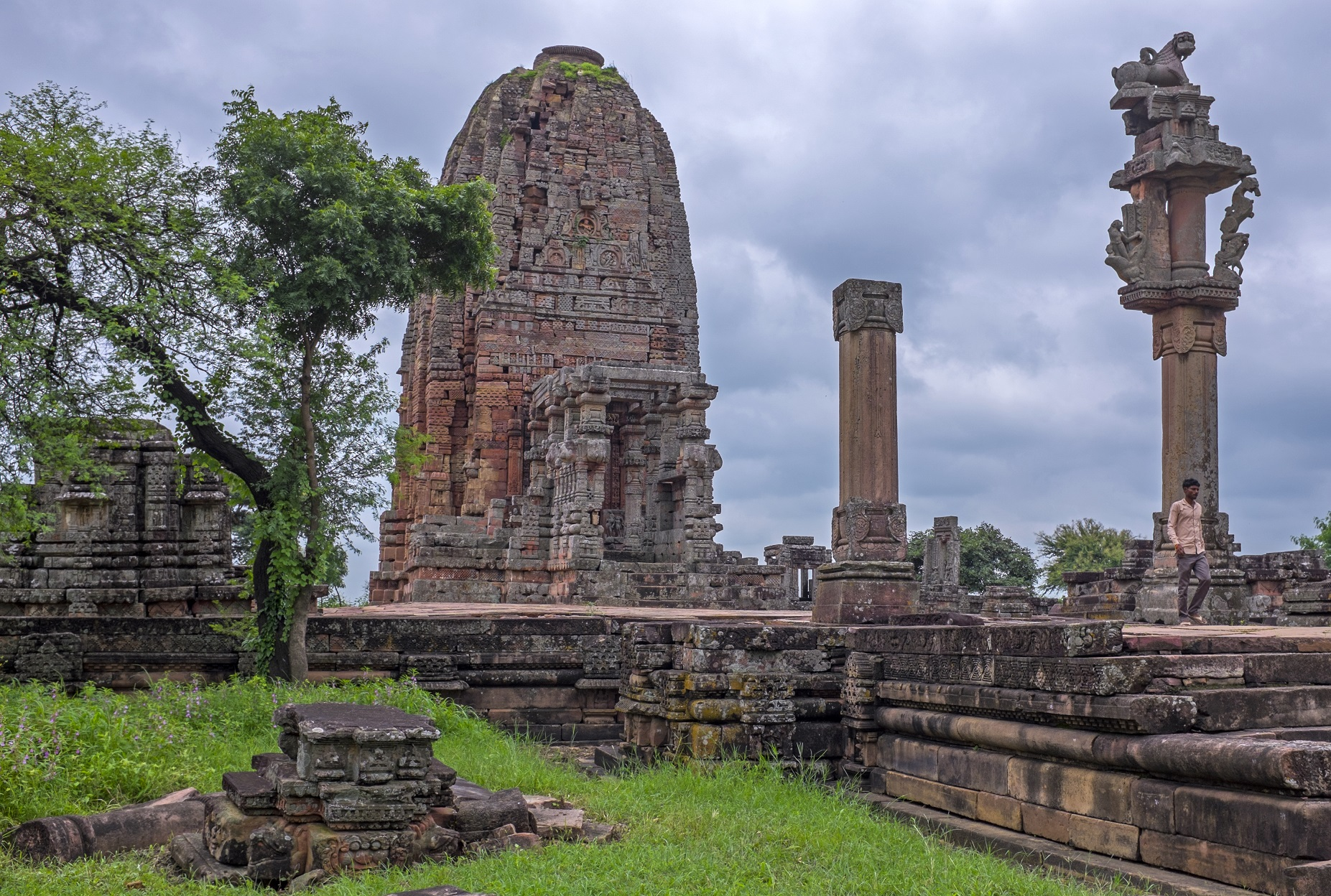

Religion
- Affiliation: Hinduism, Jainism
- Deity: Gadarmal devi, Krishna

Location
- Location: Vidisha, Madhya Pradesh
- Interactive map of Gadarmal temple
- Coordinates: 23.9182813°N 78.2224866°E

Architecture
- Style: Pratihara, Māru-Gurjara
- Creator: Gadaria Caste
- Established: 7th to 8th century
- Completed: 9th century
- Temple: 1

Gadarmal Devi temple is a Hindu and Jain temple at Badoh village of Vidisha, Madhya Pradesh. Also called Gadarmal Temple of the Mothers, it is one of India's yogini temples. It has 42 niches for yogini statues, unusually arranged in a rectangle; it must originally have been hypaethral.

== Description ==
Gadarmal Devi temple was built in the 7th-8th century by the Gadaria caste. The architecture of this yogini temple is a fusion of Pratihara and Parmara styles. It is built similar to Teli ka Mandir in Gwalior fort. This temple houses both Hindu and Jain idols. The temple is made of sandstone with seven small shrines surrounding the main shrine.

It is a 42-niche yogini temple. 18 broken images of the goddesses that once fitted into grooves in the temple platform are preserved from the waist down. It is composed of a rectangular shrine and a tall and massive Shikhara. Vidya Dehejia writes that as a yogini temple, it must once have been hypaethral, open to the sky. The temple was supposedly built by shepherds (gadariya), and is therefore called Gadarmal Devi Temple among locals.

The archaeologist Joseph David Beglar photographed a colossal bas-relief sculpture of a mother and child inside the temple in 1871–2. He called it a figure of Maya Devi and the infant Buddha.

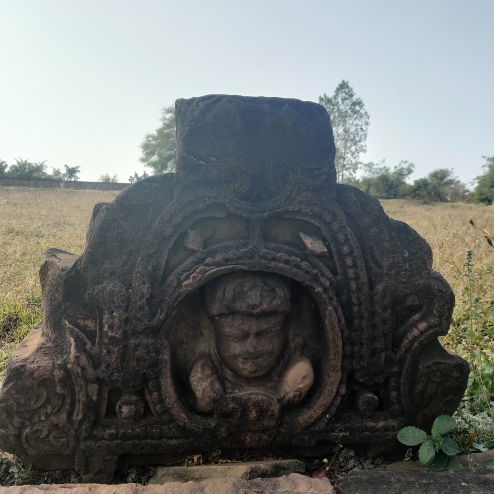
Idol of Vishnu

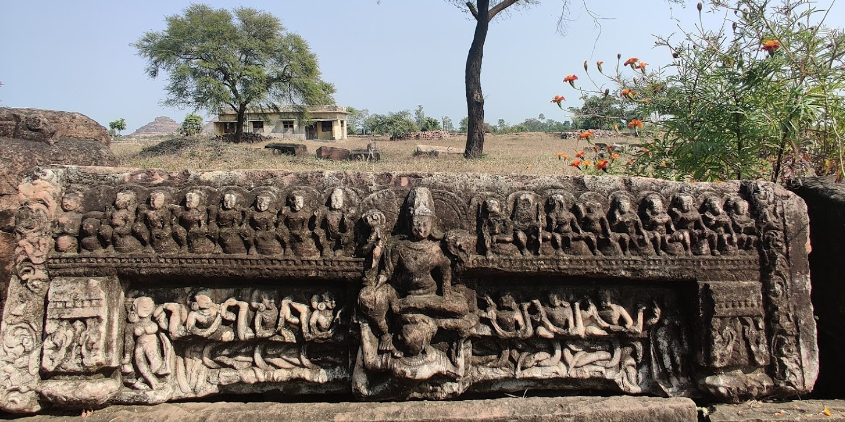
A ceiling with Idols of Hindu goddesses

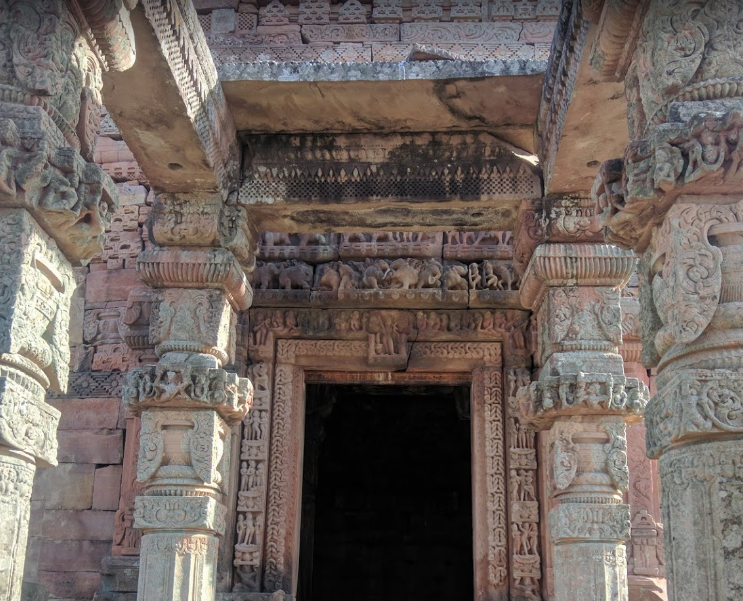
Doorway decorated with Hindu deities and human figures

== See also ==
Gadaria Caste.

- Vidisha Jain temples
- Khajuraho Group of Monuments
- Nachna Hindu temples
- Siddhachal Caves

== Sources ==
- Dehejia, Vidya (1986). Yogini Cult and Temples: A Tantric Tradition. National Museum, Janpath, New Delhi.
- Mitra, Swati (2012). Temples of Madhya Pradesh (1 ed.). Goodearth Publications. ISBN 978-9-3802-6249-9.
- "Gadarmal Temple". Archaeological Survey of India.
