= Hardua railway station =

Railway station in Madhya Pradesh

Hardua

General information
- Location: State Highway 14, Hardua, Katni district, Madhya Pradesh; India
- Coordinates: 23°54′54″N 80°17′00″E
- Elevation: 394 metres (1,293 ft)
- System: Indian Railways station
- Owner: Indian Railways
- Operator: West Central Railway
- Line: Bina–Katni line
- Platforms: 2
- Tracks: Triple Electric-Line

Construction
- Structure type: Standard (on ground)

Other information
- Status: Functioning
- Station code: HDU
- Zone(s): West Central Railway
- Division(s): Jabalpur

Services
Preceding station	Indian Railways	Following station
Patohan towards ?	West Central Railway zone Bina–Katni line	Majhagawan Phatak towards ?
Location
- Location within Madhya Pradesh Location within India
- Interactive map

Hardua railway station is a railway station in located on Bina–Katni railway line operated by the West Central Railway under Jabalpur railway division. It is situated beside State Highway 14 at Hardua, in Katni district in the Indian state of Madhya Pradesh.

== History ==
Katni Bina line was established in 1923. It was started with a single track which was later converted to double track in 1982. It got electrified during 1994–95.
