= Ratangaon railway station =

Railway station in Madhya Pradesh

Ratangaon

General information
- Location: Major District Road, Dohli, Panna district, Madhya Pradesh; India
- Coordinates: 23°50′12″N 79°53′33″E
- Elevation: 449 metres (1,473 ft)
- System: Indian Railways station
- Owner: Indian Railways
- Operator: West Central Railway
- Line: Bina–Katni line
- Platforms: 2
- Tracks: Triple Electric-Line

Construction
- Structure type: Standard (on ground)
- Parking: Yes

Other information
- Status: Functioning
- Station code: RTGN
- Zone(s): West Central Railway
- Division(s): Jabalpur

Services
Preceding station	Indian Railways	Following station
Sagoni towards ?	West Central Railway zone Bina–Katni line	Salaia towards ?
Location
- Location within Madhya Pradesh Location within India
- Interactive map

Ratangaon railway station is a railway station in located on Bina–Katni railway line operated by the West Central Railway under Jabalpur railway division. It is situated beside Major District Road, at Dohli, Panna district in the Indian state of Madhya Pradesh.

== History ==
Katni Bina line was established in 1923. It was started with a single track which was later converted to double track in 1982. It got electrified during 1994–95.
