= Rithi =

Village in Katni, Madhya Pradesh, India

Rithi रीठी
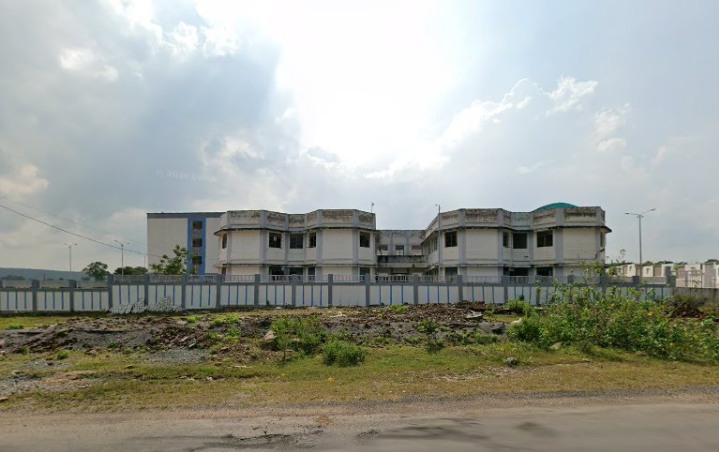
- CM Rise School Rithi

- Location in Madhya Pradesh, India Rithi (India)
- Coordinates: 23°54′39″N 80°08′31″E
- Country: India
- State: Madhya Pradesh
- District: Katni

Languages
  - Official: Hindi
- Time zone: UTC+5:30 (IST)
- Postal code: 483990
- Telephone code: 07622
- Vehicle registration: MP 21

Rithi is a village, development block and Tehsil headquarters in Katni district, Madhya Pradesh, India.

It has Rithi railway station on the Bina Katni Rail Line. Ken River Originates from near Rithi. Rithi village has population of 3835 of which 1986 are males while 1849 are females as per Census 2011.
