= Christ Church, Mhow =

Christ Church
- Christ Church, Mhow
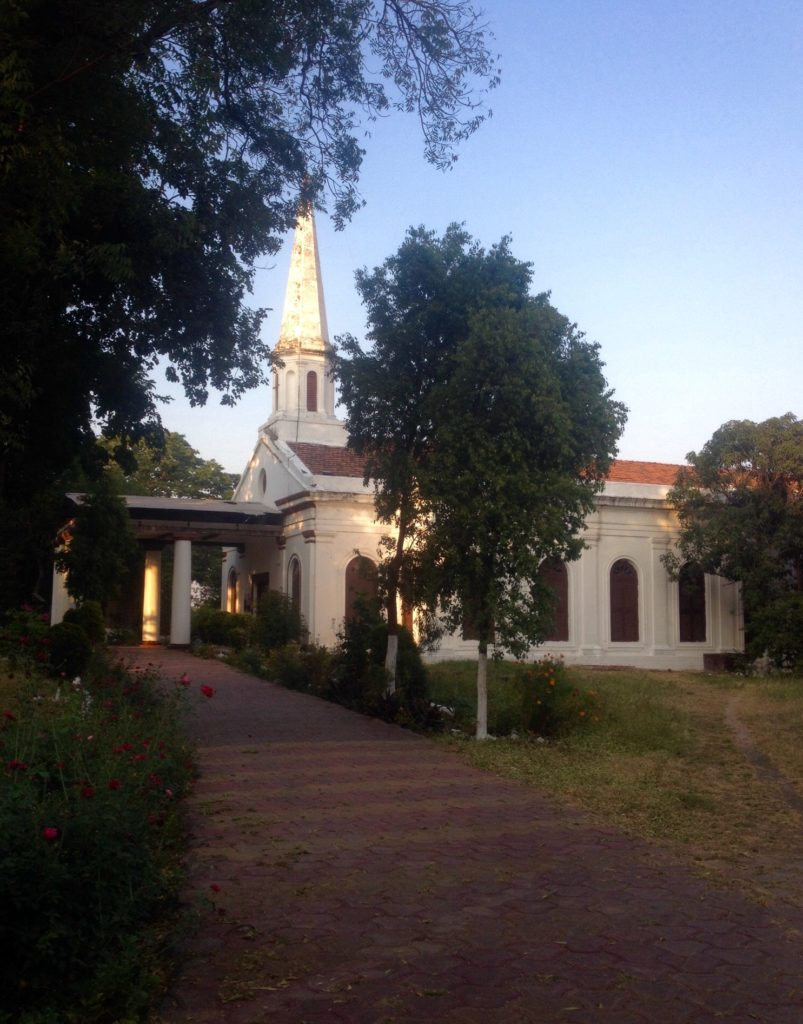
- Christ Church in 2020
- Christ Church
- 22°33′37″N 75°45′36″E
- Location: Mhow
- Country: India
- Denomination: Non-denominational
- Tradition: Anglican

History
- Consecrated: 1823

Architecture
- Functional status: Functional
- Years built: 1818-1823
- Groundbreaking: 1818
- Completed: 1823
- Construction cost: £ 4,500 (INR 45000)

Administration
- Diocese: Independent

Christ Church is a non-denominational Christian church, previously Anglican, located on Mall Road, Mhow, Madhya Pradesh, India. It was built by men of the Warwickshire and Brecknockshire regiments, the first British army units to be based in Mhow, as a garrison church, and consecrated in 1823. In addition to being a functional church, the building is a major tourist attraction for the array of Commemorative and Memorial plaques that have been installed by various units of the British Army during their tenures at Mhow.

== Architecture ==
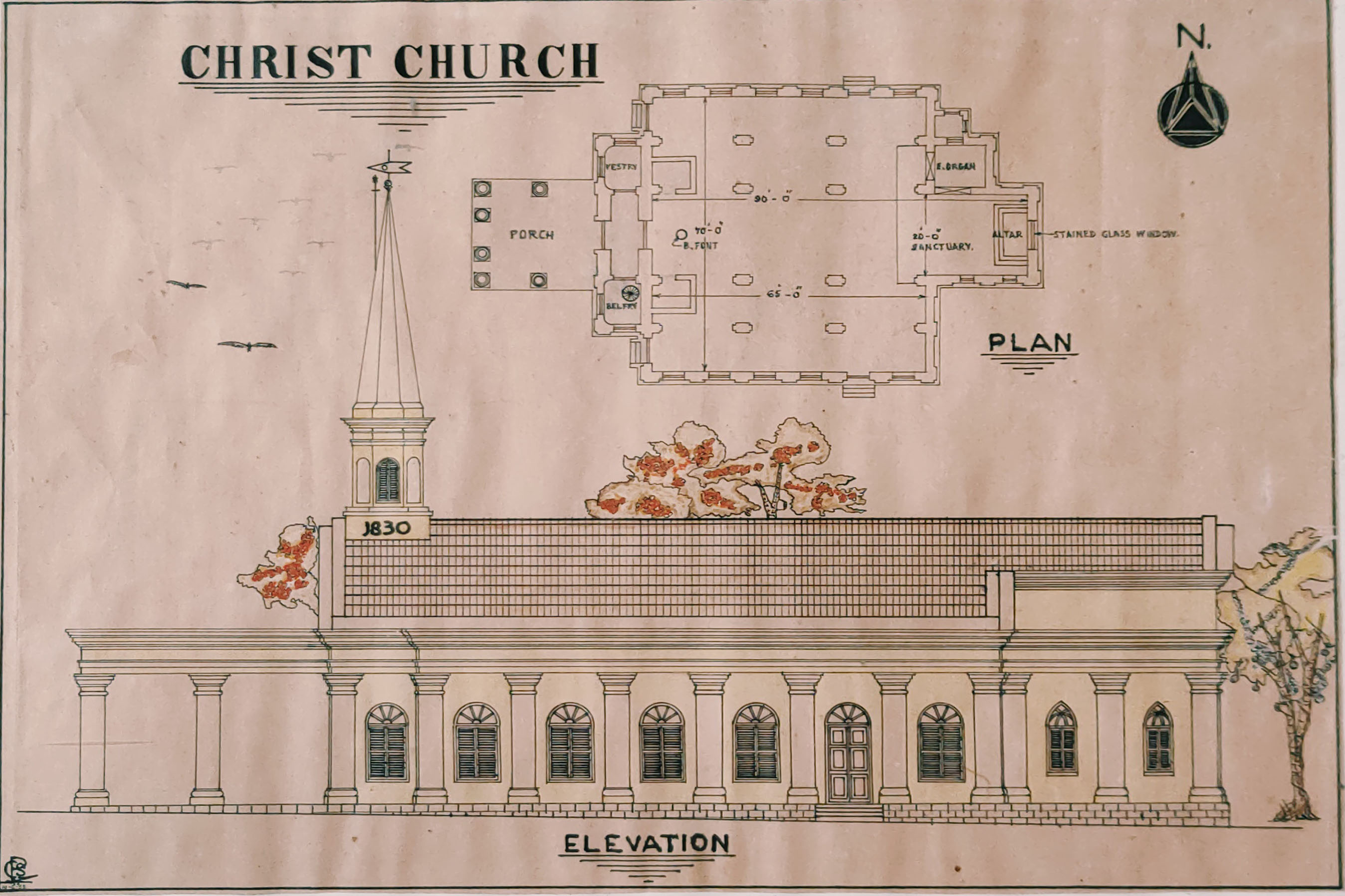
A Floor plan and scaled drawing of Christ Church, Mhow

The church building seems to have a modified Early English Gothic Style of construction. There is a single transept at the fore of the building, while the steeple stands approximately 10 metres high to the aft, topped by a spire and belfry, wherein the bell is housed. In its final (present) form, there is a white marble altar at the East end of the building which was installed in 1881, in keeping with the reformed Protestant traditions of the time. There are two large intricate stained glass windows above the Altar at the East end, one representing Jesus on the Cross and the other depicting Jesus with His apostles. Having been established and used as a church by members of the British Army, there are several memorial plaques installed along the inner walls of the building.

== History ==
=== Establishment of the Cantonment and Church ===
Consequent to the signing of the Treaty of Mandsaur in 1818, between the East India Company and Malhar Rao Holkar, the British held general political and military charge in this part of Central India. A British Cantonment was planned and founded at the Southern Corner of the Malwa Plateau by Major General Sir John Malcolm GCB, KLS. While the British Resident with a strong posse of troops was housed in a building at Manpur (in the present-day Navodaya School at Manpur), overlooking the main axis leading from Pune (the seat of power of the Maratha Empire), the British Cantonment was established on a somewhat narrow ridge with an elevation of 1800 feet above MSL, at Mhow. The British Infantry Barracks were constructed at the Southern end of Mhow, the area presently being occupied by the Military College of Telecommunication Engineering (MCTE); while Christ Church was built at the Northern end. The Church was located diagonally opposite the Old Parade Ground, where the Headquarters of the Infantry School, Mhow was located up to 2014. It was referred to as the ‘Church of England’, so as to differentiate it from the ‘Church of Scotland’ & ‘Church of Ireland’ – also constructed at Mhow for the troops from those countries to worship.

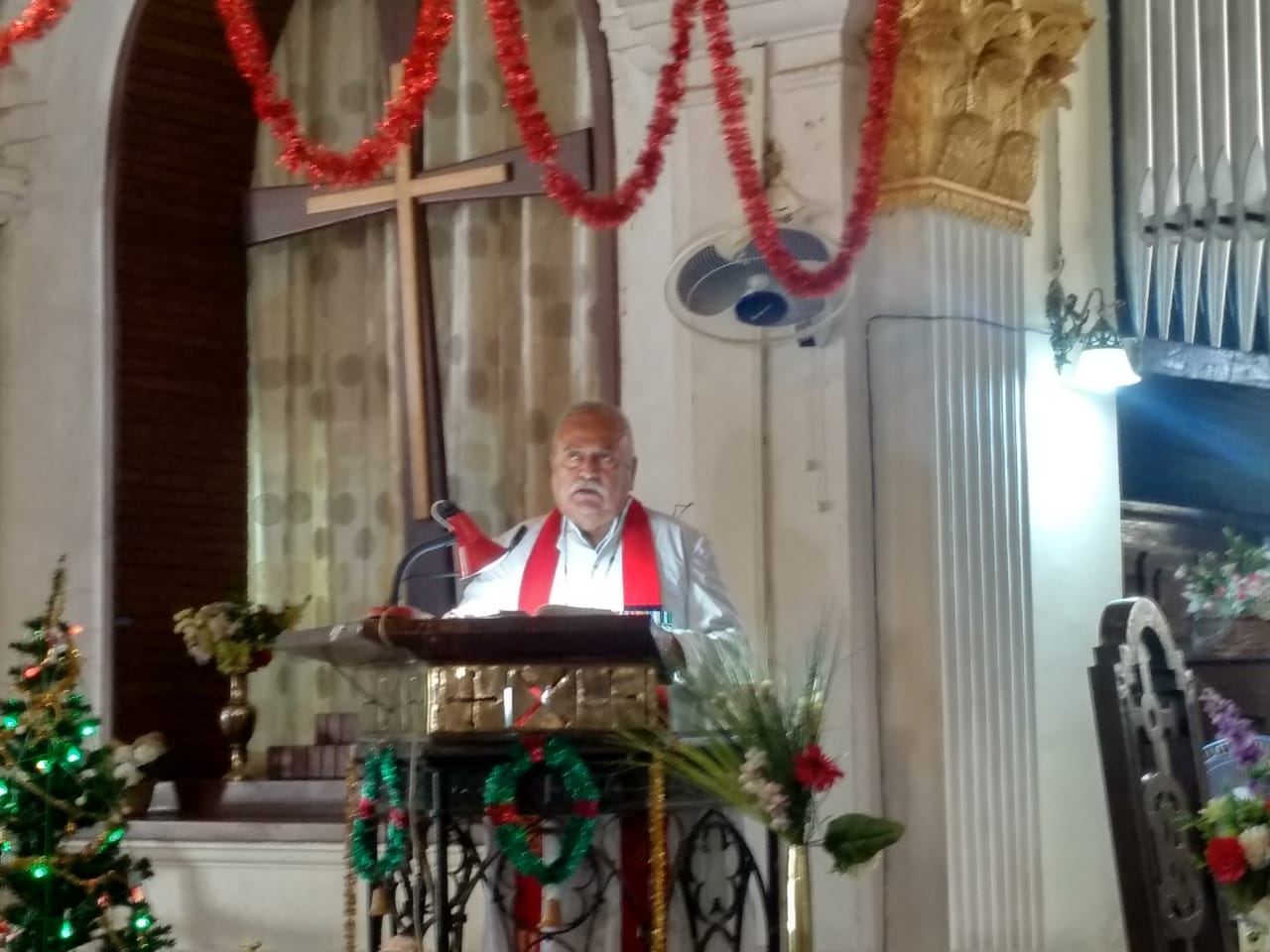
Maj Samuel Paul (Retd), Presbyter of the Christ Church, Mhow delivers a Sunday Sermon.

=== Construction and Expansion ===
The construction of the Church happened at the same time as that of the Mhow Fort. However, the Church took two years longer – being completed and consecrated in 1823. The central portion of the Church was initially constructed with a temporary structure. The Northern and Southern wings of the building were added subsequently. The expansion was carried out by British Army units stationed at Mhow, as they felt the space inside was inadequate to accommodate the congregation. In its final state, the Church was capable of housing one Infantry Battalion. Windows were installed on the Northern and Southern wings in 1877. It was at this time that Rifle Holders were installed on the pews of the Church, as a result of the experience of the Indian Rebellion of 1857. The Church was shifted to the Prayer House of the 17th Lancers in 1878, while the canvas roof was being replaced with a wooden structure and tiles, which remain intact to this day. The building is supported entirely by a framework of Teak, while the walls are Brickwork with Lime mortar. With the Steeple, the Church was the tallest building of Mhow at the time of construction. The marble Altar was established later, in 1881 – under the supervision of Reverend RC Mills, the then chaplain of the Church.

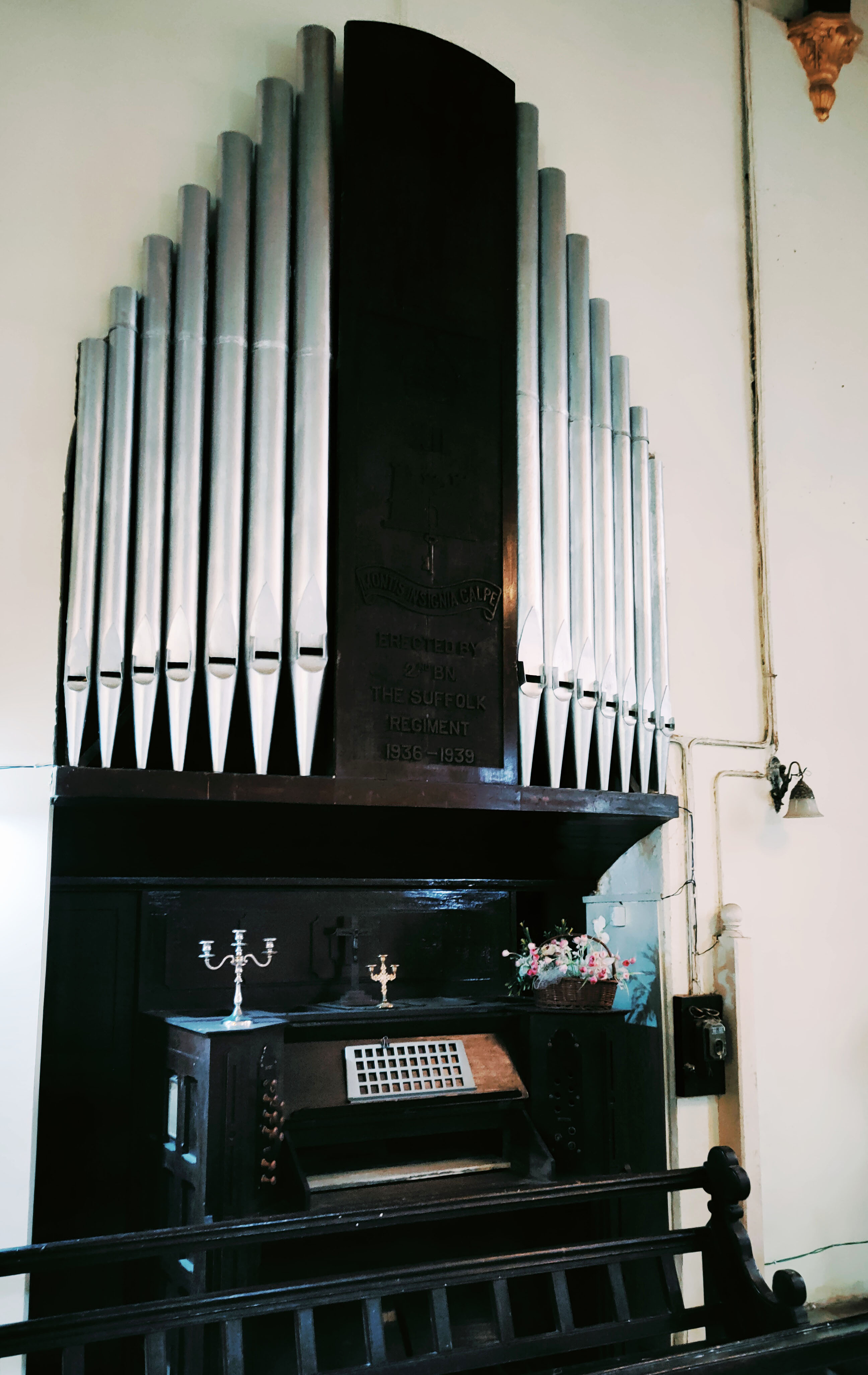
This Organ was installed at Christ Church, Mhow by the 2nd Battalion of the Suffolk Regiment of the British Army. The Organ is not functional as on date.

=== Installation of Pipe Organ ===
The Pipe organ was installed by the 2nd Battalion The Suffolk Regiment in 1936. This entailed the construction of an additional room for the bellows, windchest and other equipment. The Organ has 14 pipes, arranged in ranks from either extremity. In its present form, the Organ is not functional as a result of vandalism of equipment over the years.

=== Period between 1947 and 1971 ===
In 1947, the Church was rechristened Christ Church and Reverend WB Parmar, the Veterinary Doctor of the Cantonment Board, Mhow was appointed as minister. He continued till his death in 1971, which coincided with the moving out of all military personnel for the 1971 Indo Pak War. Till this time, the Church was supervised by the Right Reverend JW Sadiq, Bishop of Nagpur; while the repairs and upkeep of the building was done by the Military Engineer Services (MES).

=== 1971 to 1992 ===
As the military units of Mhow moved out for the 1971 War, the MES was unable to undertake maintenance of the Church. The Church witnesses considerable decay during the period between 1971 and 1992 with looting of artefacts and furniture and squatting in the compounds. The Bhopal Diocese tried to claim the Church as part of their property during this time.

=== 1992 Onwards ===
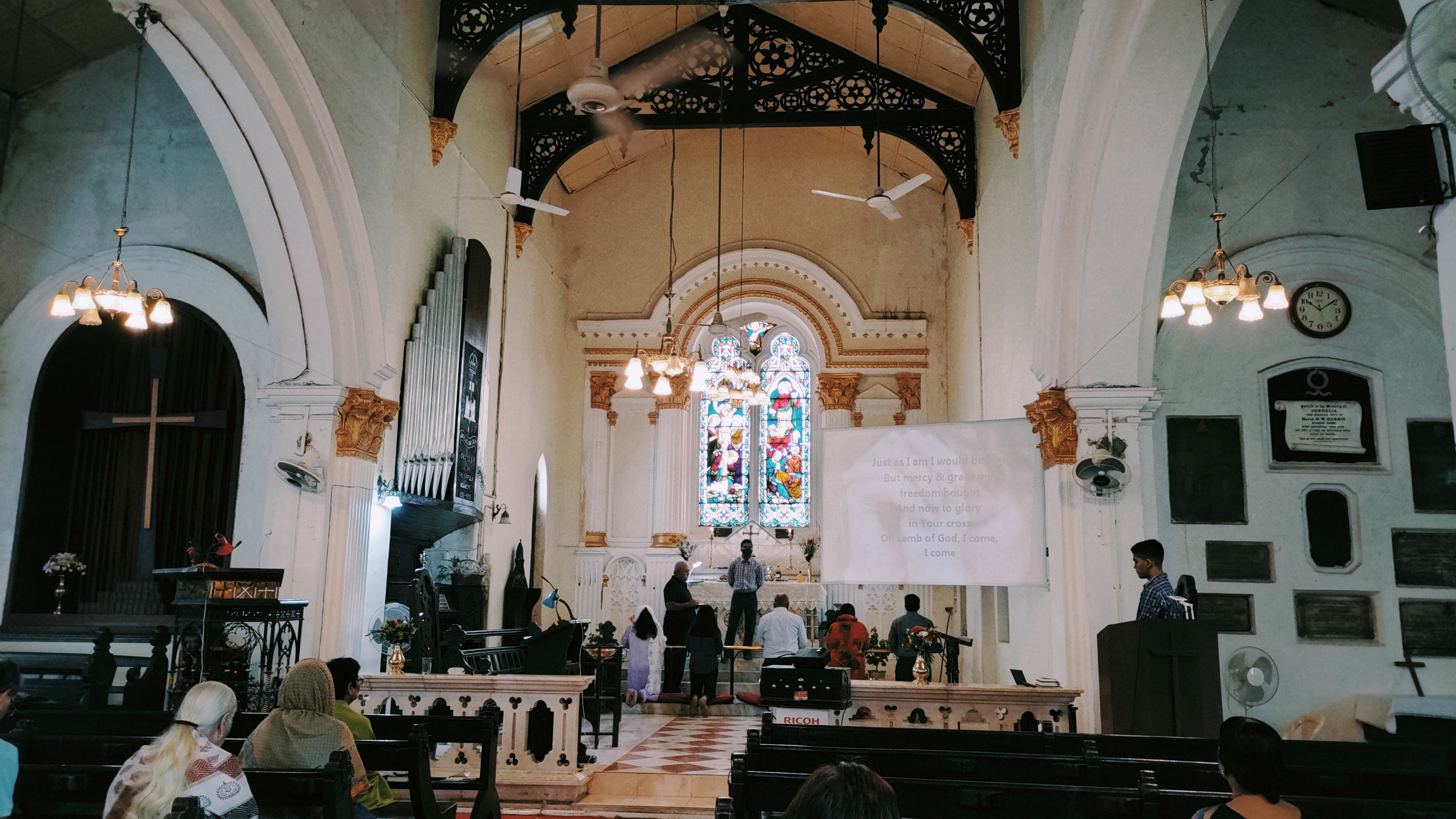
A Sunday morning Church Service in 2021, attended mostly by servicemen and their families

In 1992, Major Samuel Paul (Retired), an old resident of Mhow returned upon retirement from the Indian Army (Regiment of Artillery and Army Intelligence Corps). The Officer formed a committee of all the former members of the Church and began the work of making the Church functional again. With the help of the Station Headquarters, Mhow, the squatters were evicted from the compound of the Church. Having attained his Masters in Divinity degree in 2004, Major Paul has been performing the duties of Minister and Honorary Parish Priest. He undertook efforts to re-confirm the Church as a Garrison Church and organised repairs of the building in 2004, paid for by contributions by members. Over the years, Infantry Battalions stationed at Mhow have contributed to the maintenance and upkeep of this heritage building and religious institution. Presently, the Church has multi-denominational attendance, with a significant transient membership of service personnel and their families who visit Mhow for military duties. Sunday services usually follow the pattern enunciated in the Book of Common Prayer, following the formal structure given therein.

== Gallery of Commemorative Plaques ==
Christ Church Mhow has 50 Commemorative and Memorial plaques installed on various locations along the inner walls. These have been placed by units and persons, in memory of those who died while they were stationed at Mhow Cantonment. A few newer plaques have been installed post-Independence, in memory of prominent members of the church. These plaques serve both as a memorial and as a reliable record of the history of Mhow as a Cantonment.

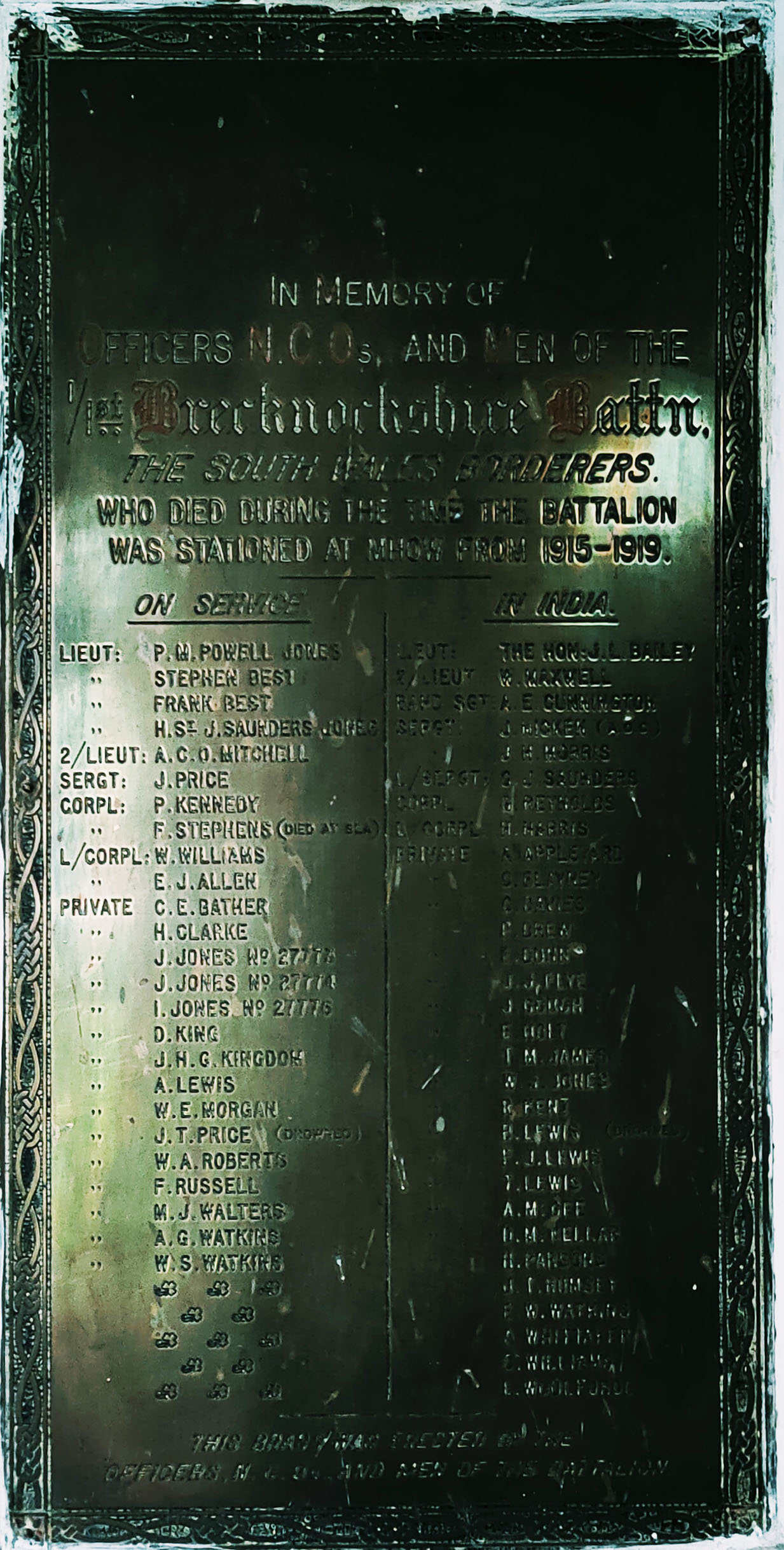
The 1/1st Brecknockshire Battalion South Wales Borderers was stationed at Mhow between 1915-1919 and installed this plaque

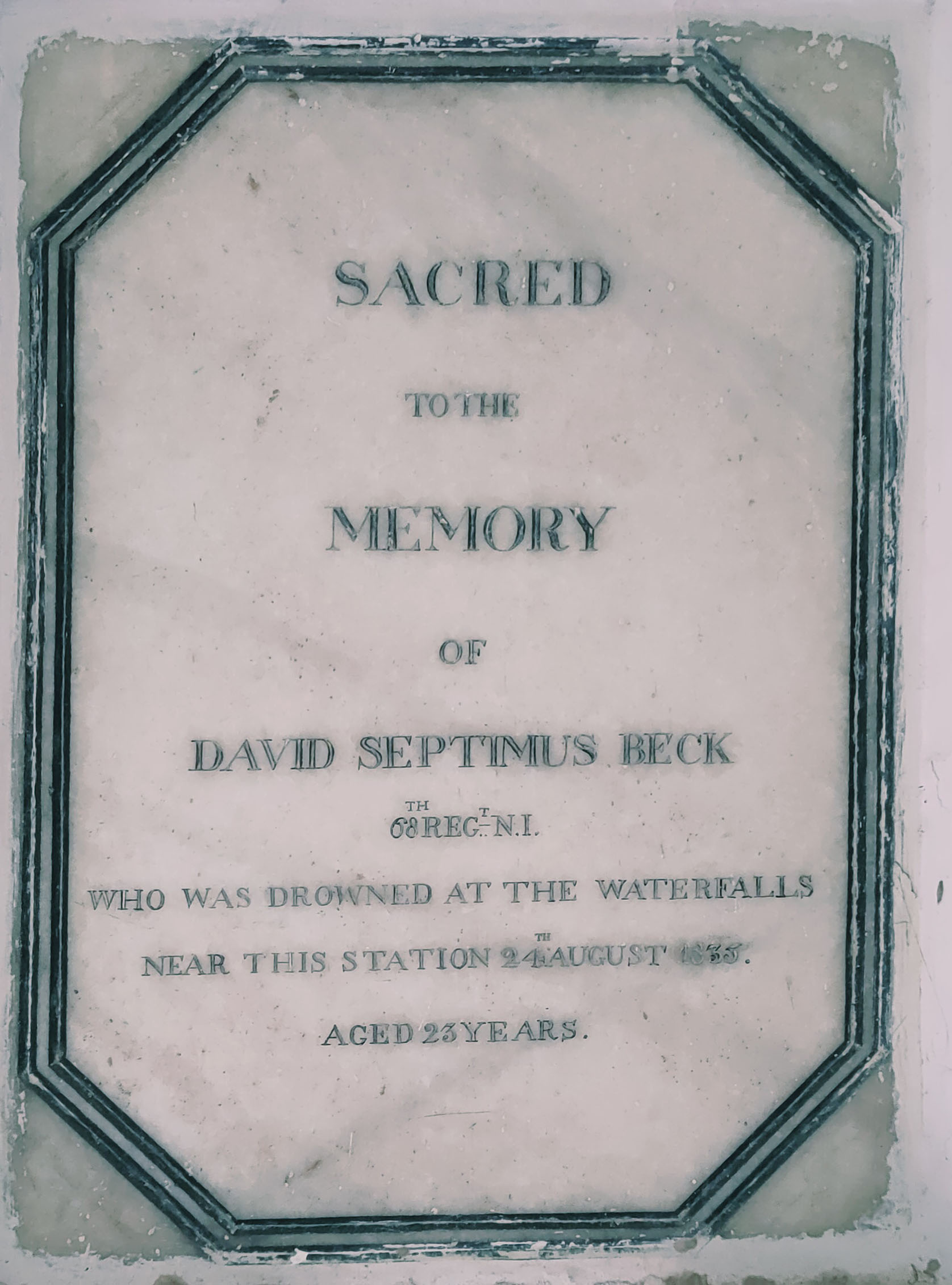
The 68th Regiment of Native Infantry installed a plaque in honour of David Beck, who drowned at Patalpani waterfall near Mhow

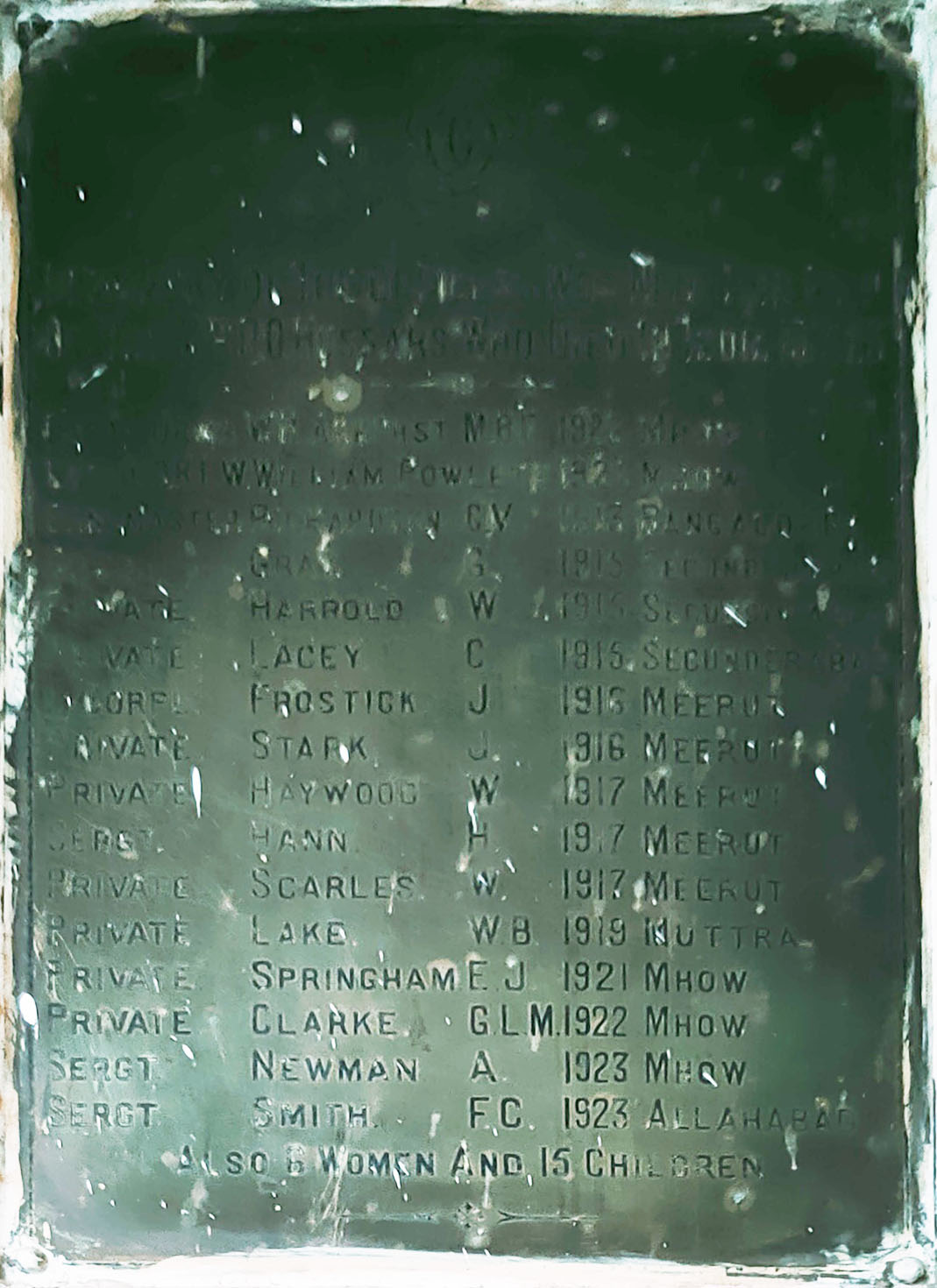
One of the Hussars units installed this plaque. The details of the exact unit are faded with time.

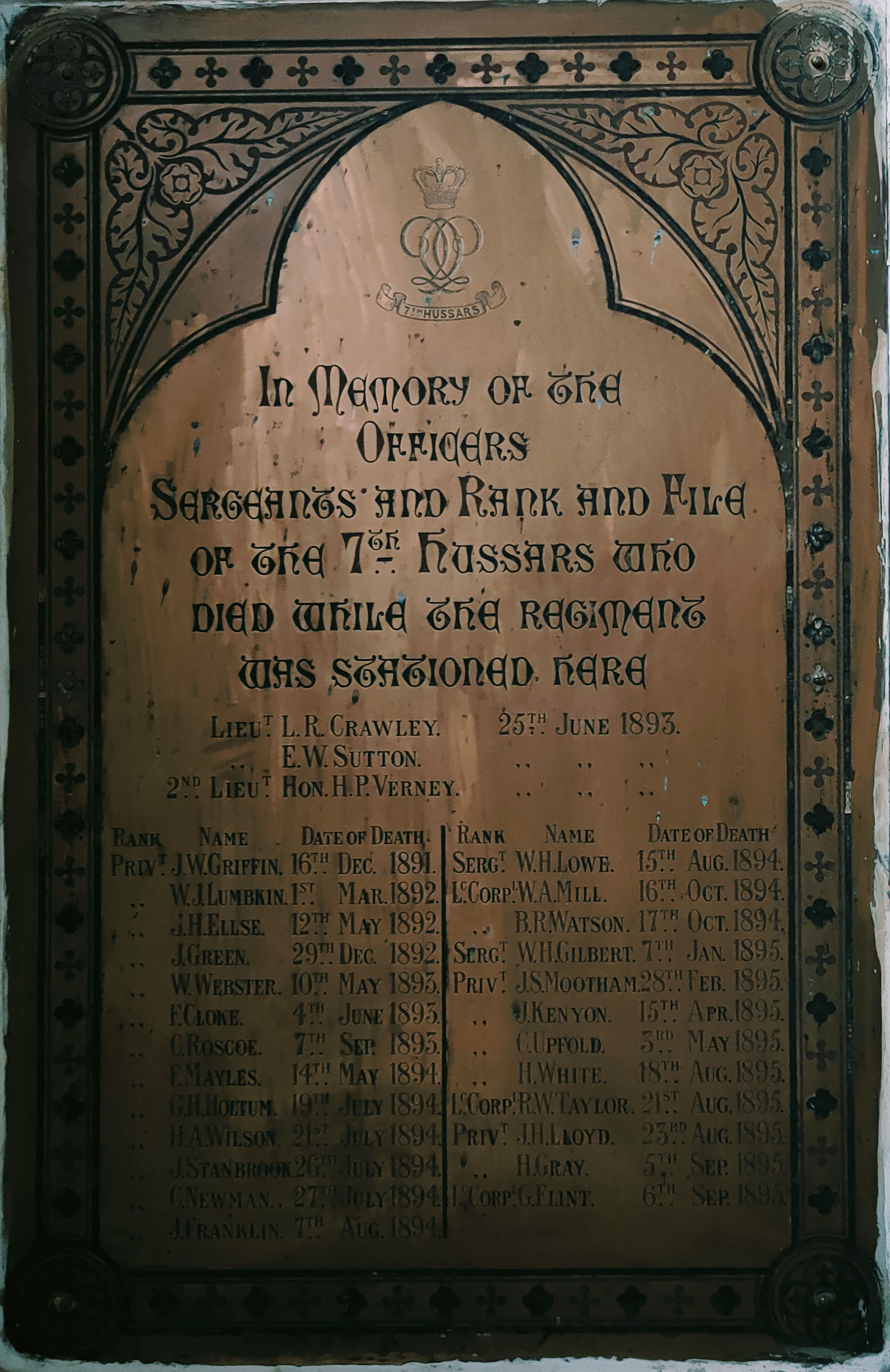
The 7th Hussars installed this in memory of 3 Officers and several men who died while they were stationed in Mhow between 1891 and 1895

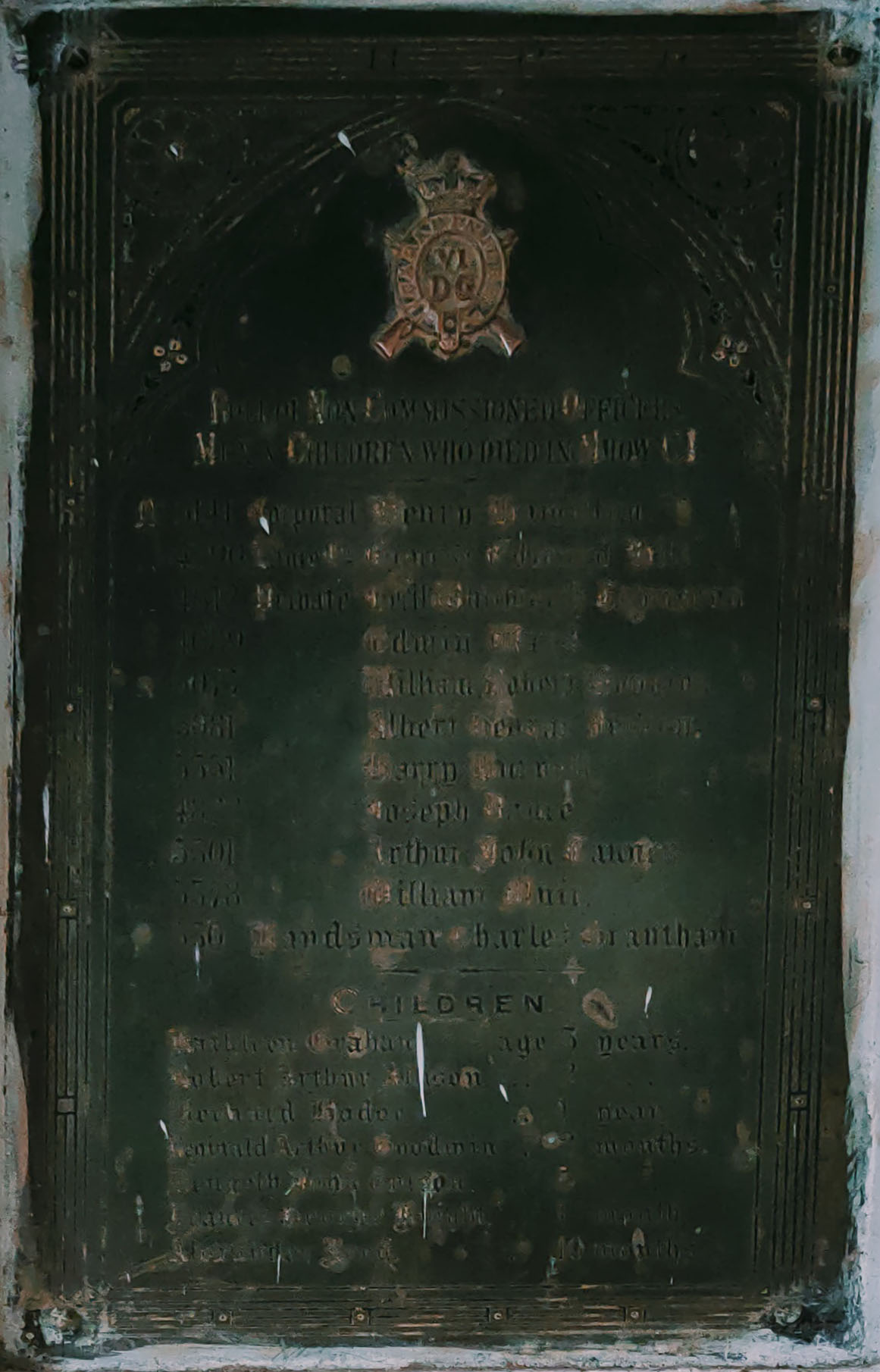
Brass plaque installed by The Carabiniers (6th Dragoon Guards)

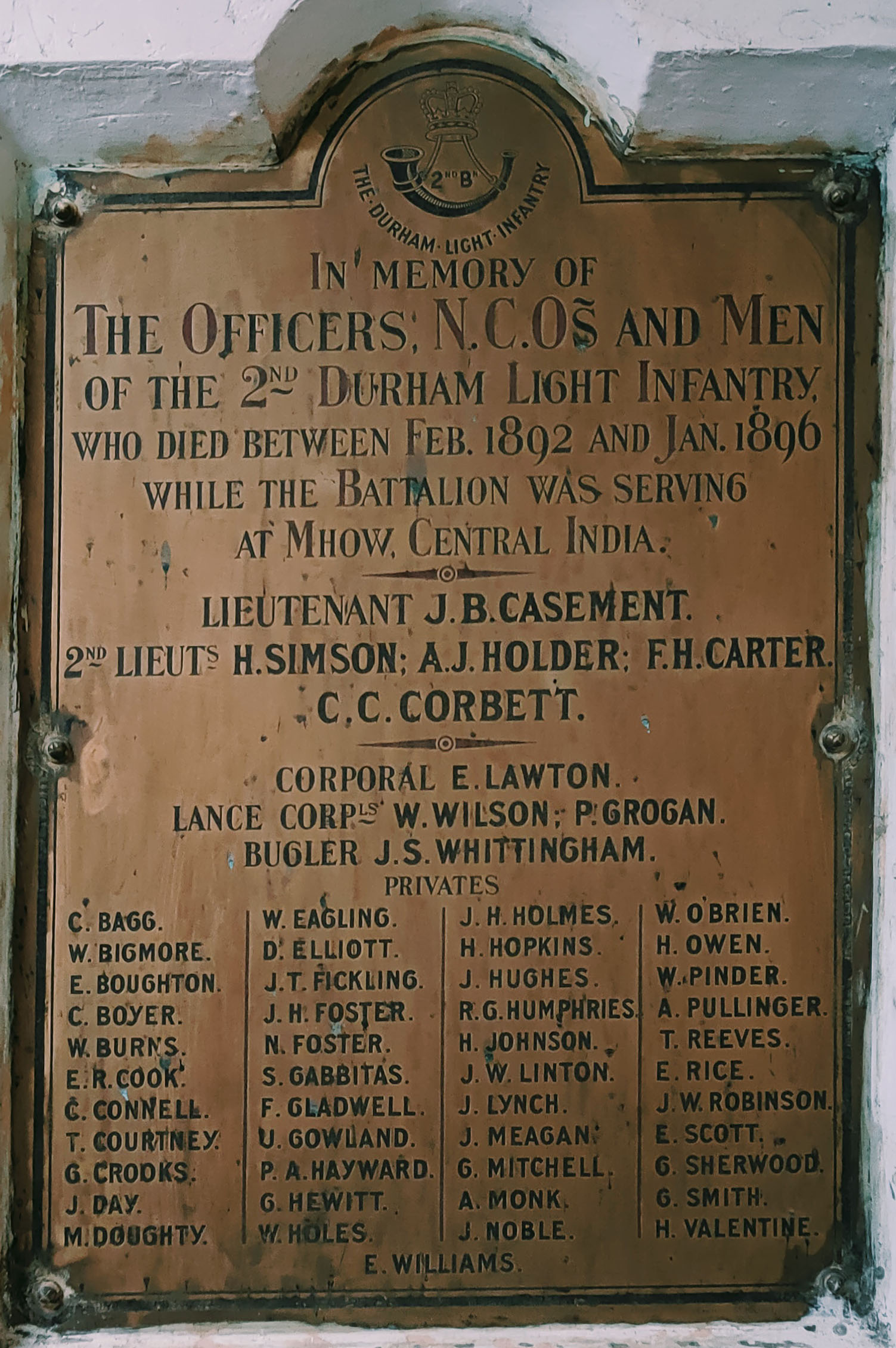
The 2nd Durham Light Infantry installed this during their tenure at Mhow between 1892 and 1896

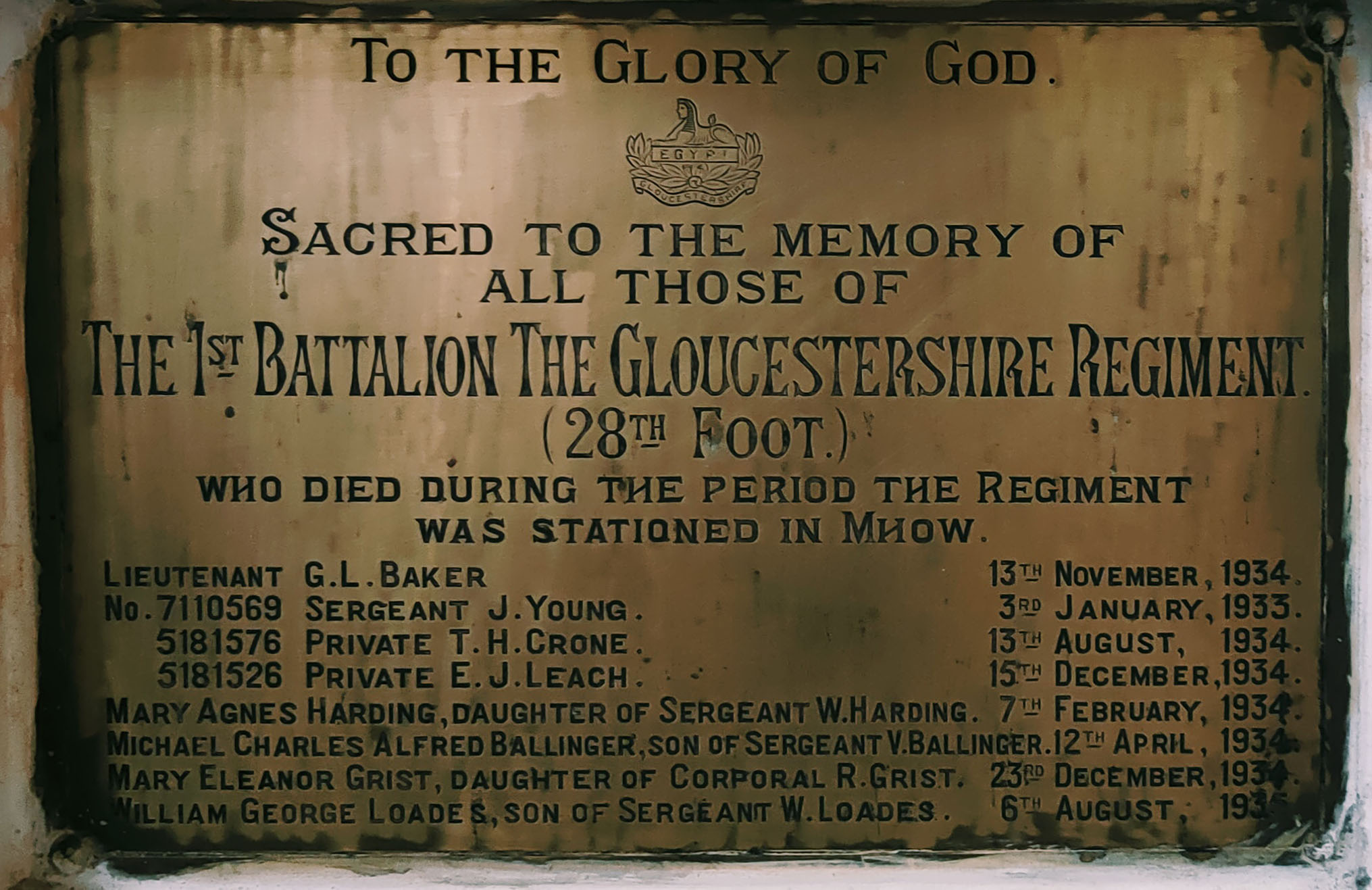
The 1st Battalion The Gloucestershire Regiment (28th Foot) was stationed at the Cantonment from 1934 to 1936

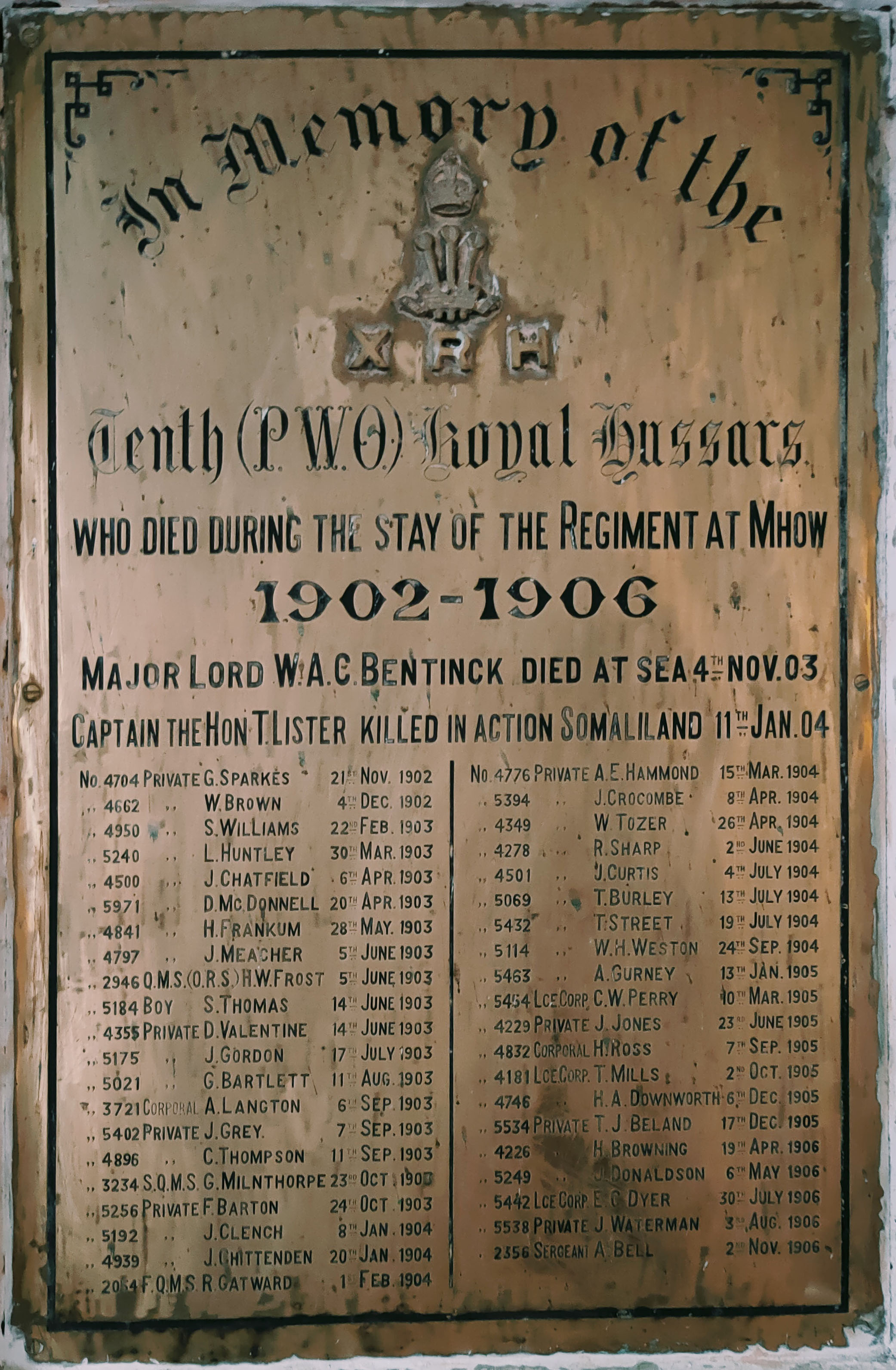
The 10th (Prince of Wales' Own) Royal Hussars were stationed at Mhow from 1902 to 1906 when several of their Officers and Men died

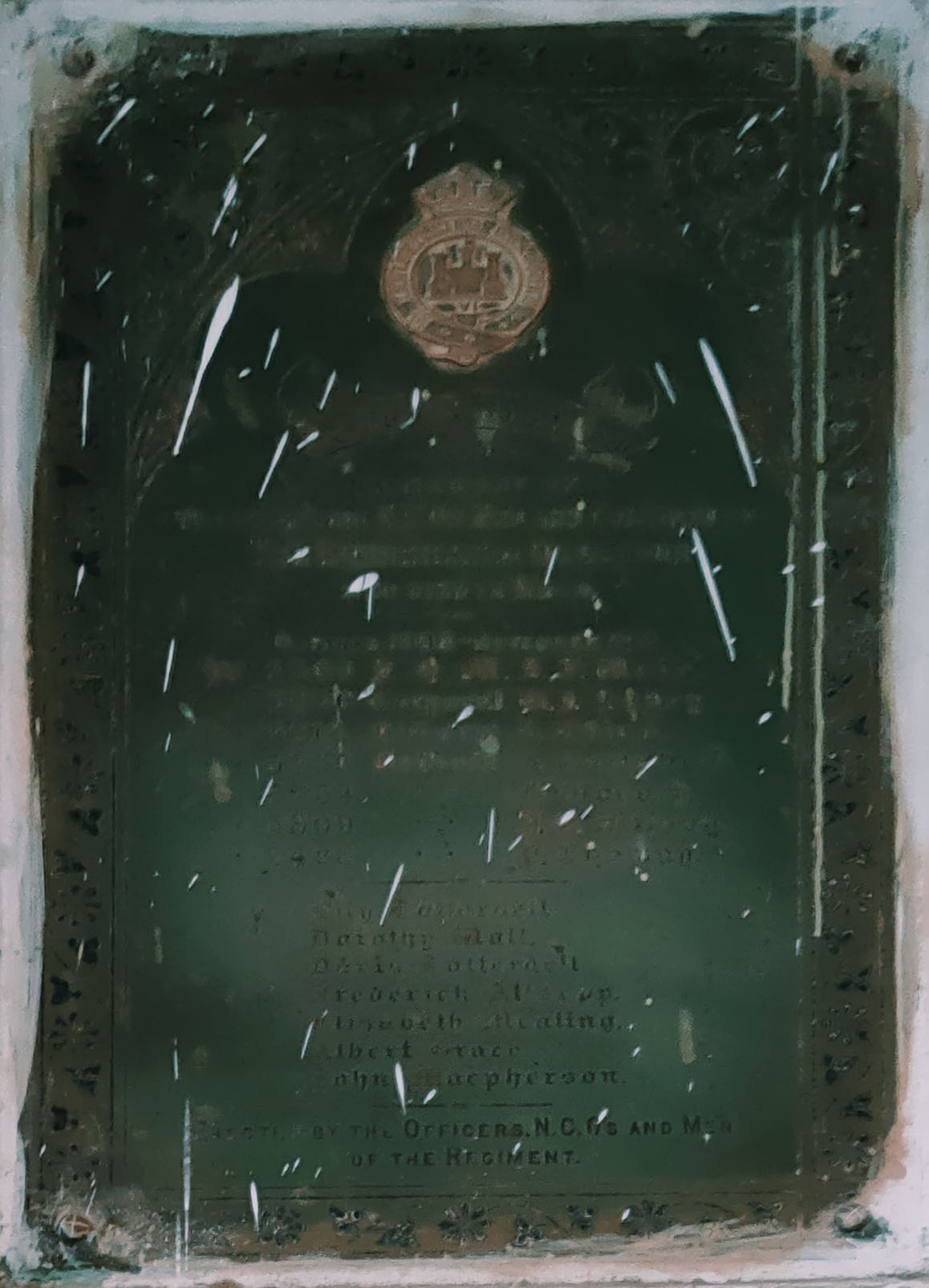
A plaque, ostensibly installed by the Royal Engineers during their stay at Mhow

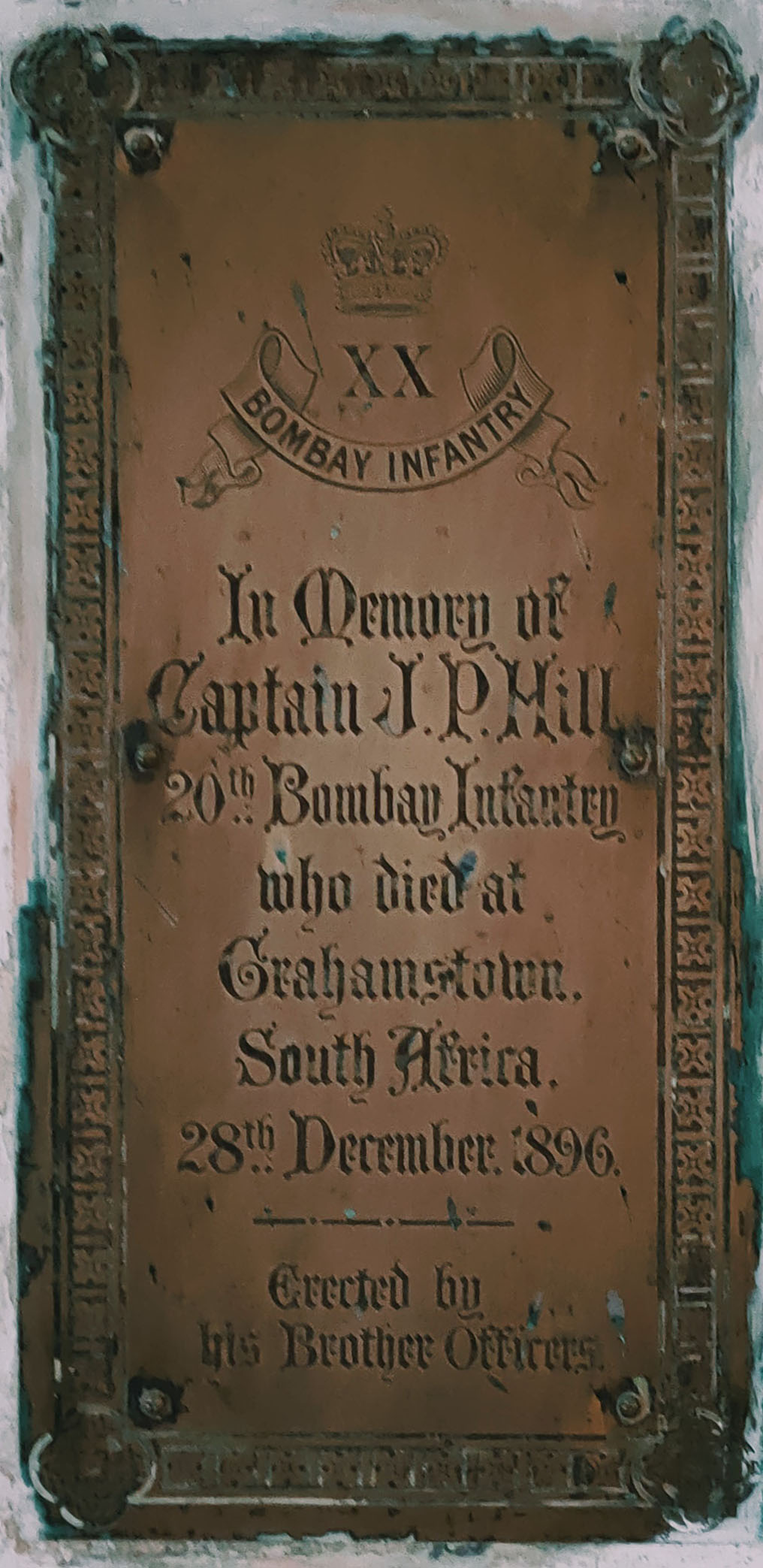
The 20th Bombay Infantry installed this plaque, in memory of one of their officers, Captain JP Hill

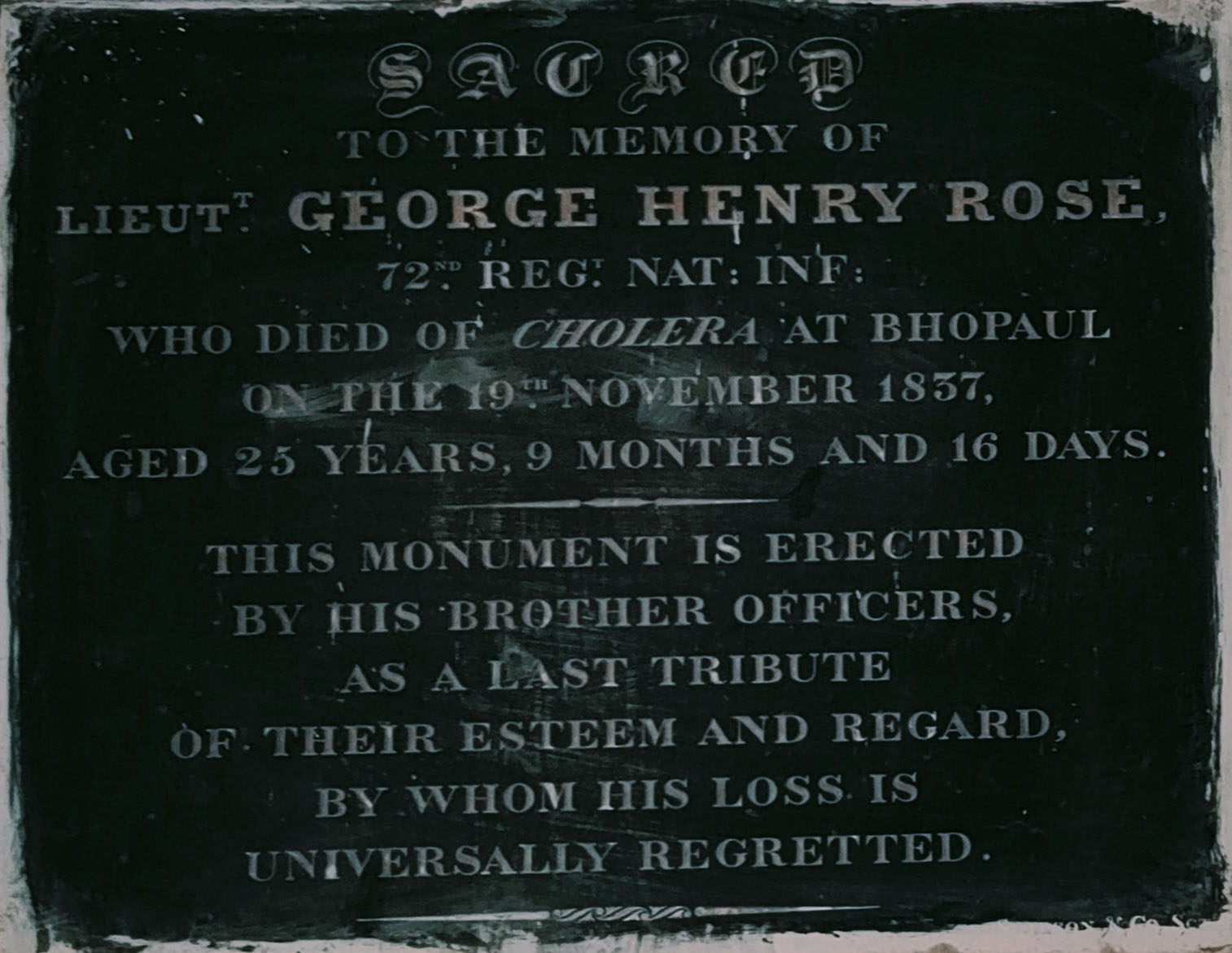
The 72nd Regiment of the Native Infantry installed a black stone memorial to one of their officers who died of cholera

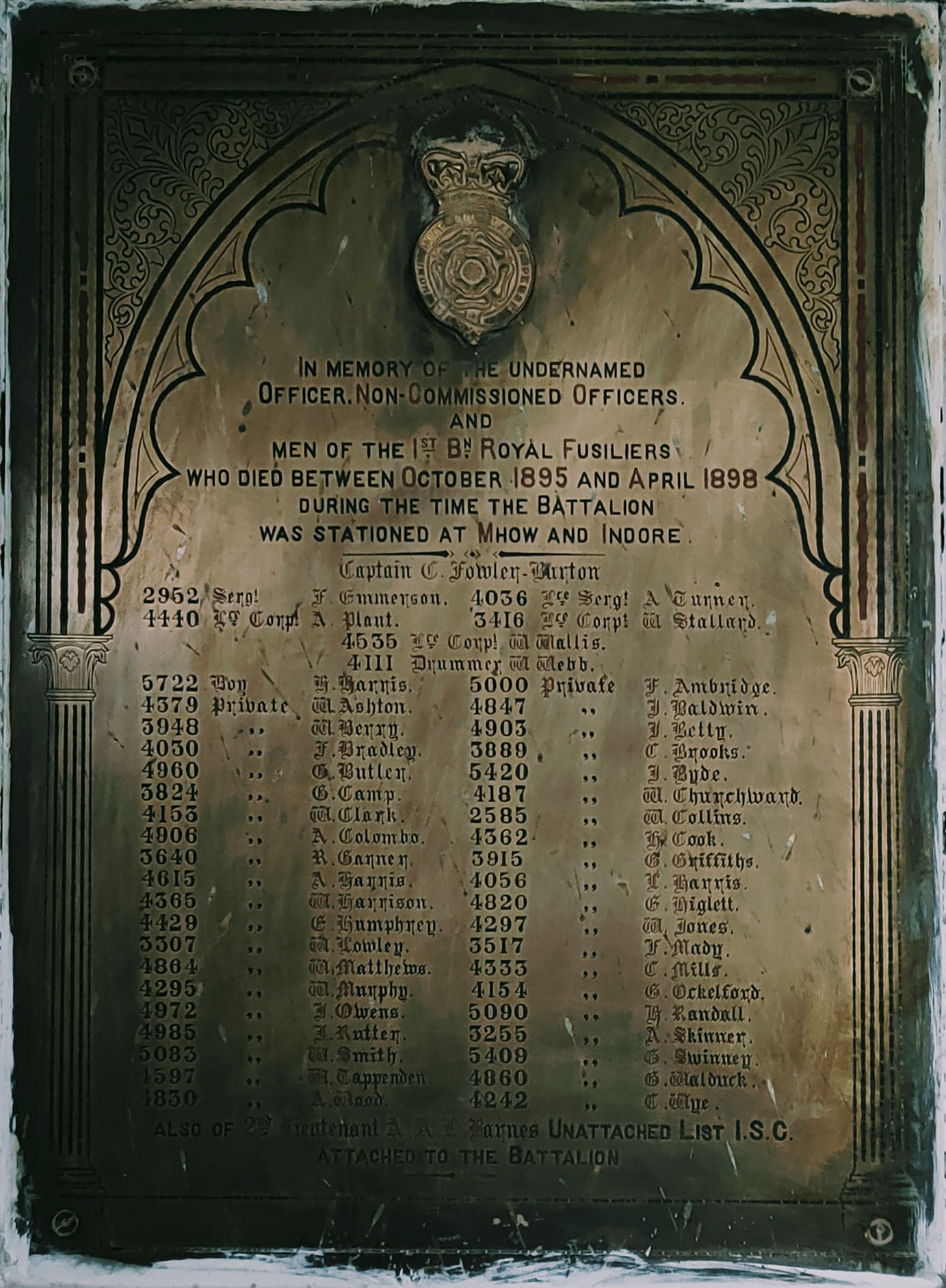
The 1st Battalion Royal Fusiliers were stationed at Mhow and Indore between 1895 and 1898

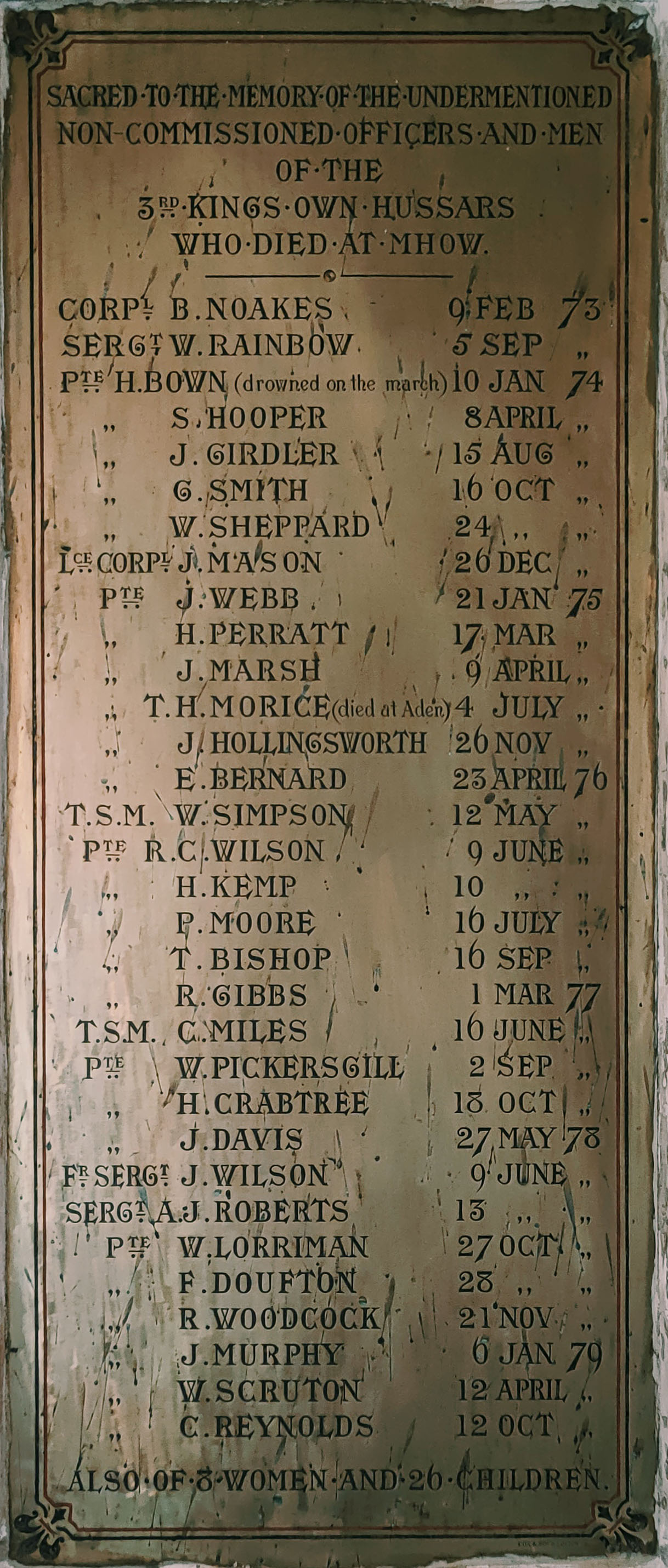
Between 1873 and 1879, The 3rd (King's Own) Hussars were stationed here and installed this brass plaque

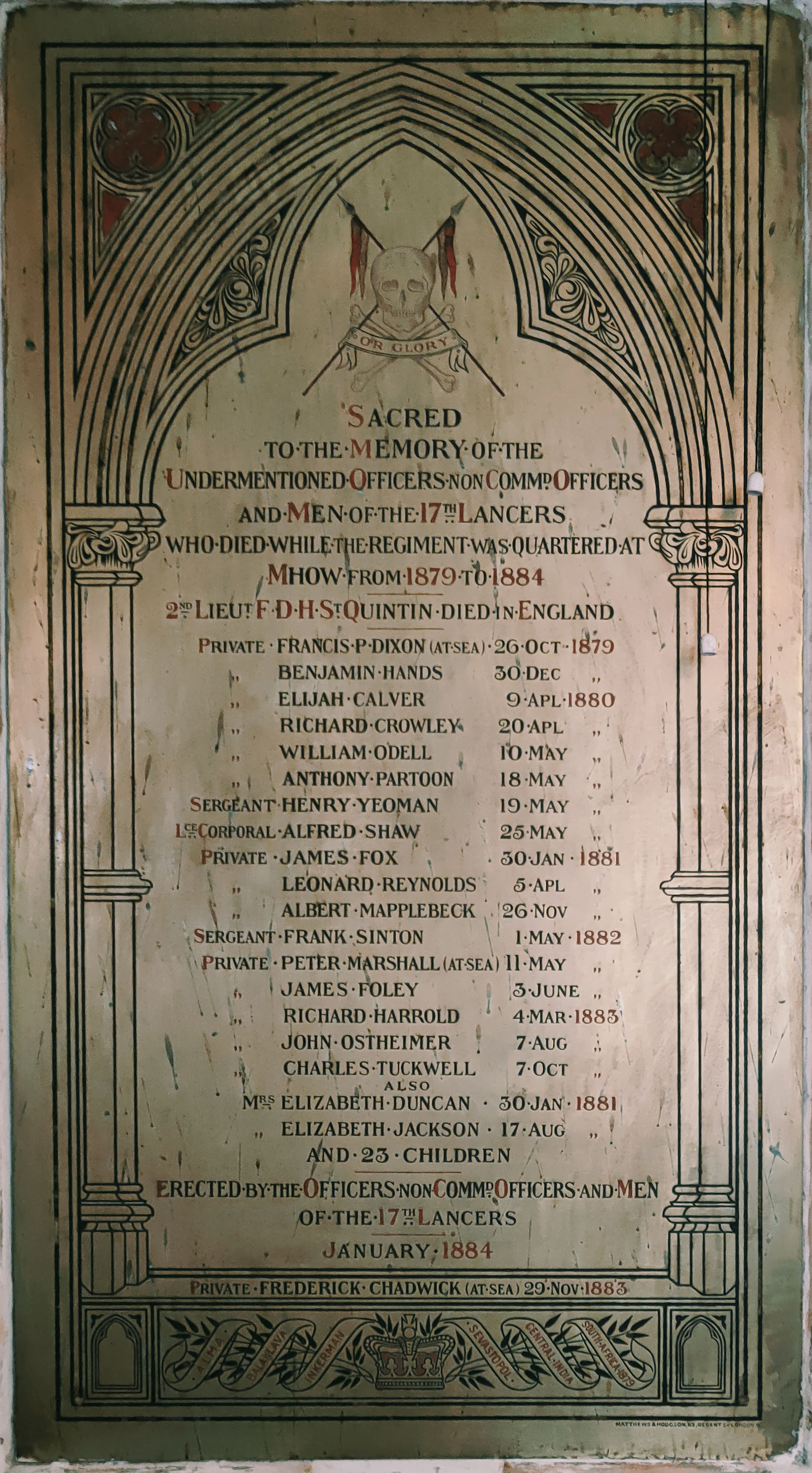
The 17th Lancers installed this brass plaque to honour their losses during the period from 1879 to 1884

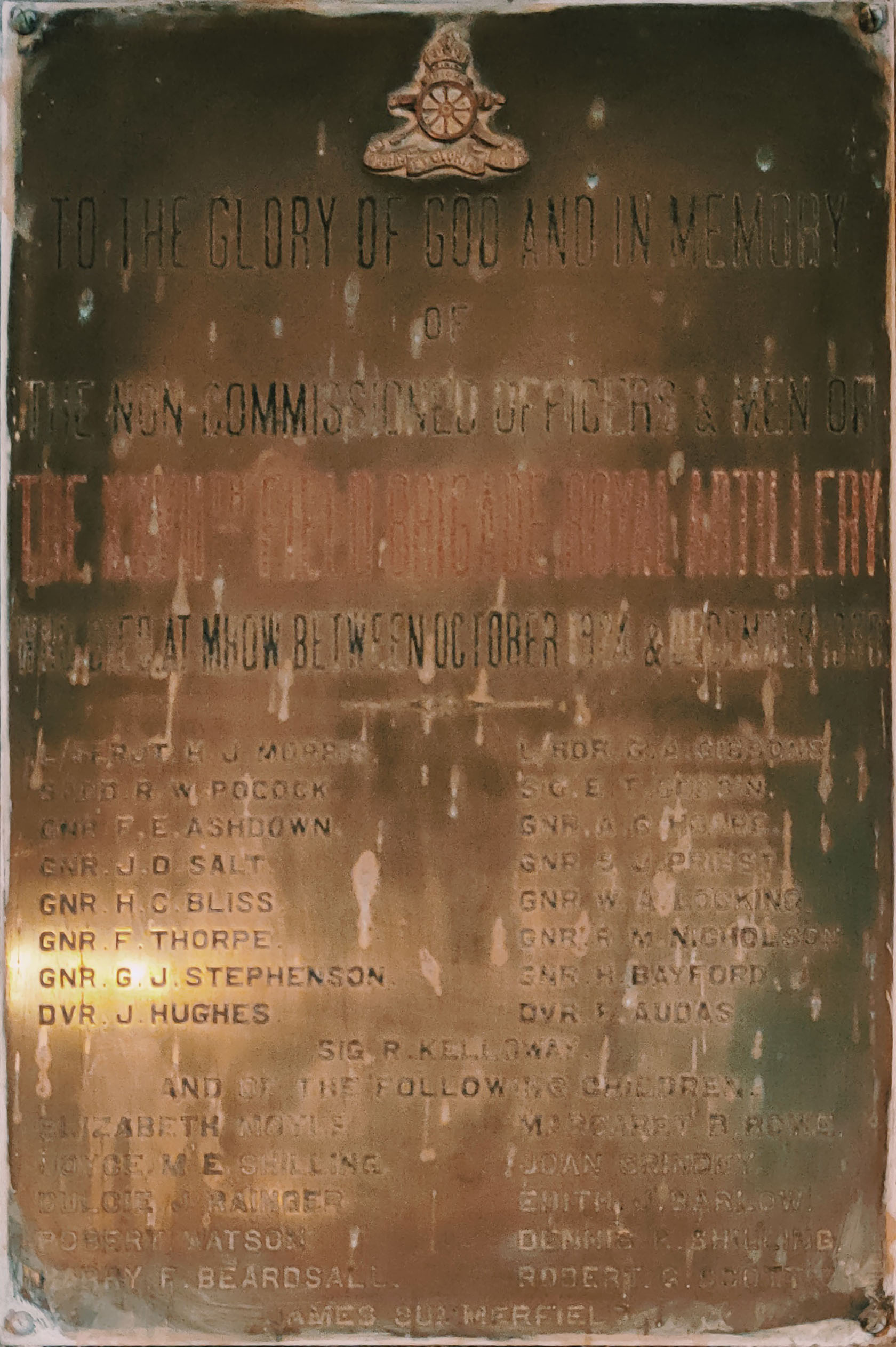
The 27th Field Brigade of the Royal Artillery was stationed at Mhow and created a memorial to their men

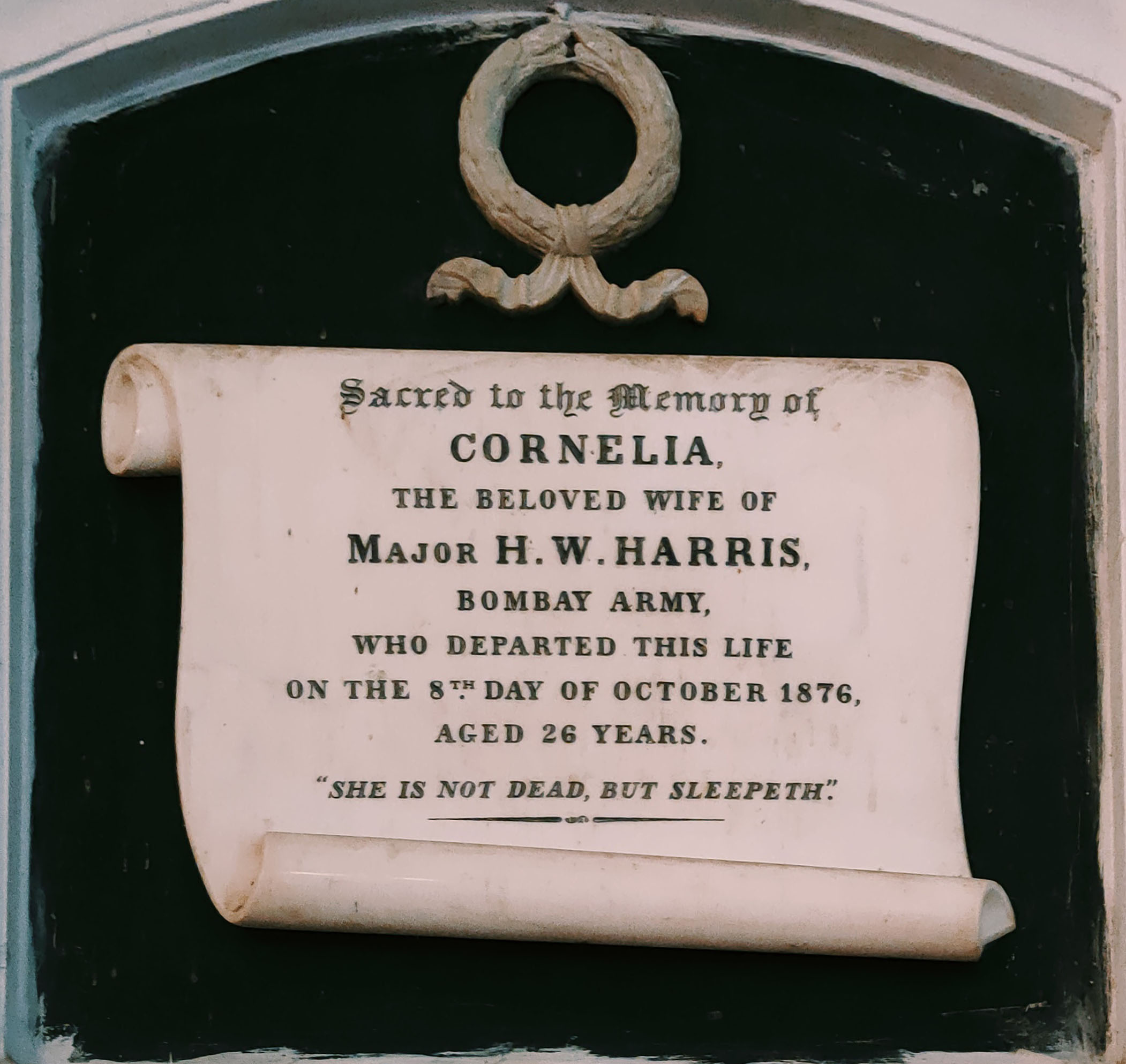
Cornelia, the wife of Major HW Harris of the Bombay Army is mentioned in this plaque

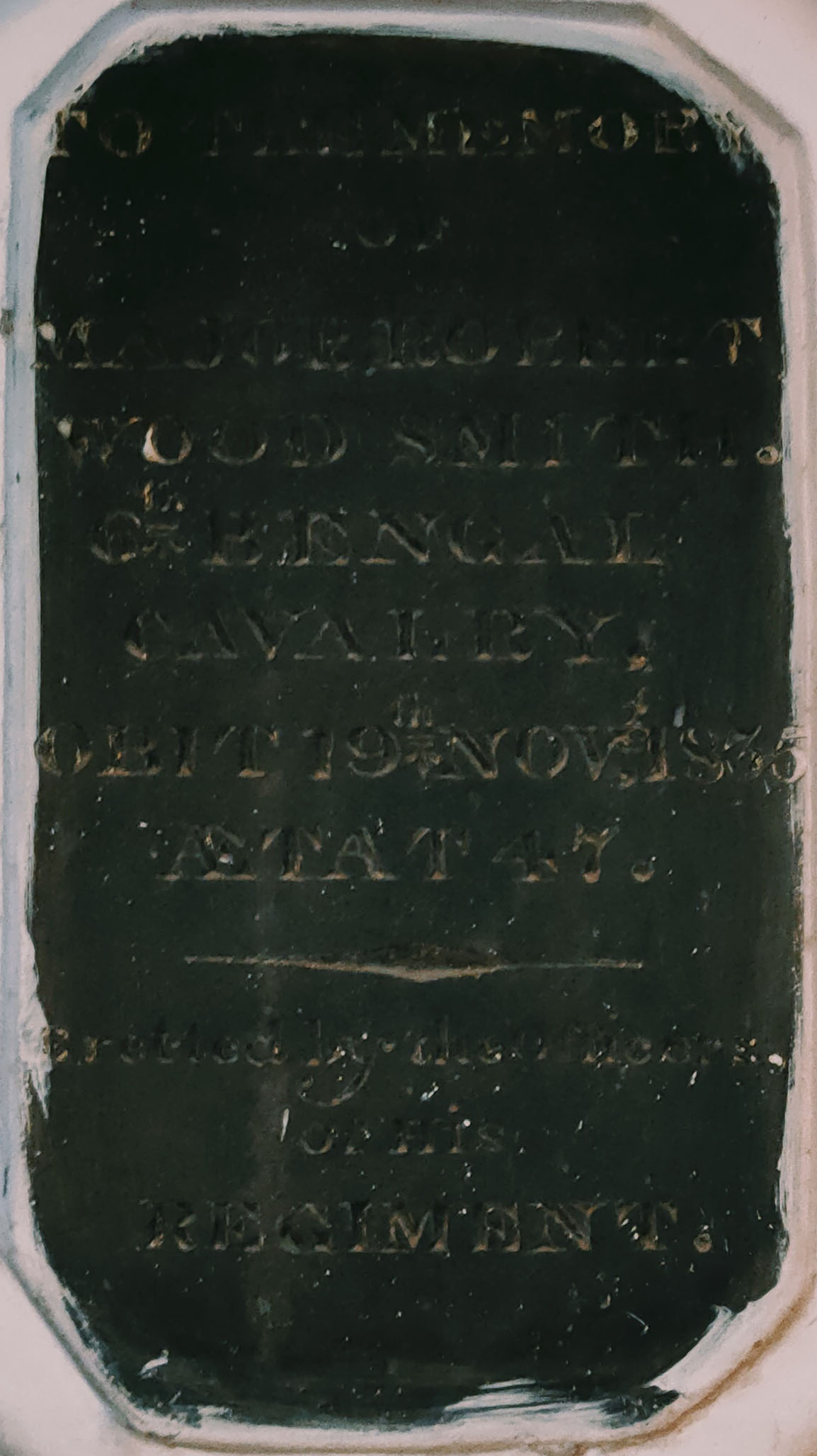
The 6th Bengal Cavalry is mentioned in this plaque

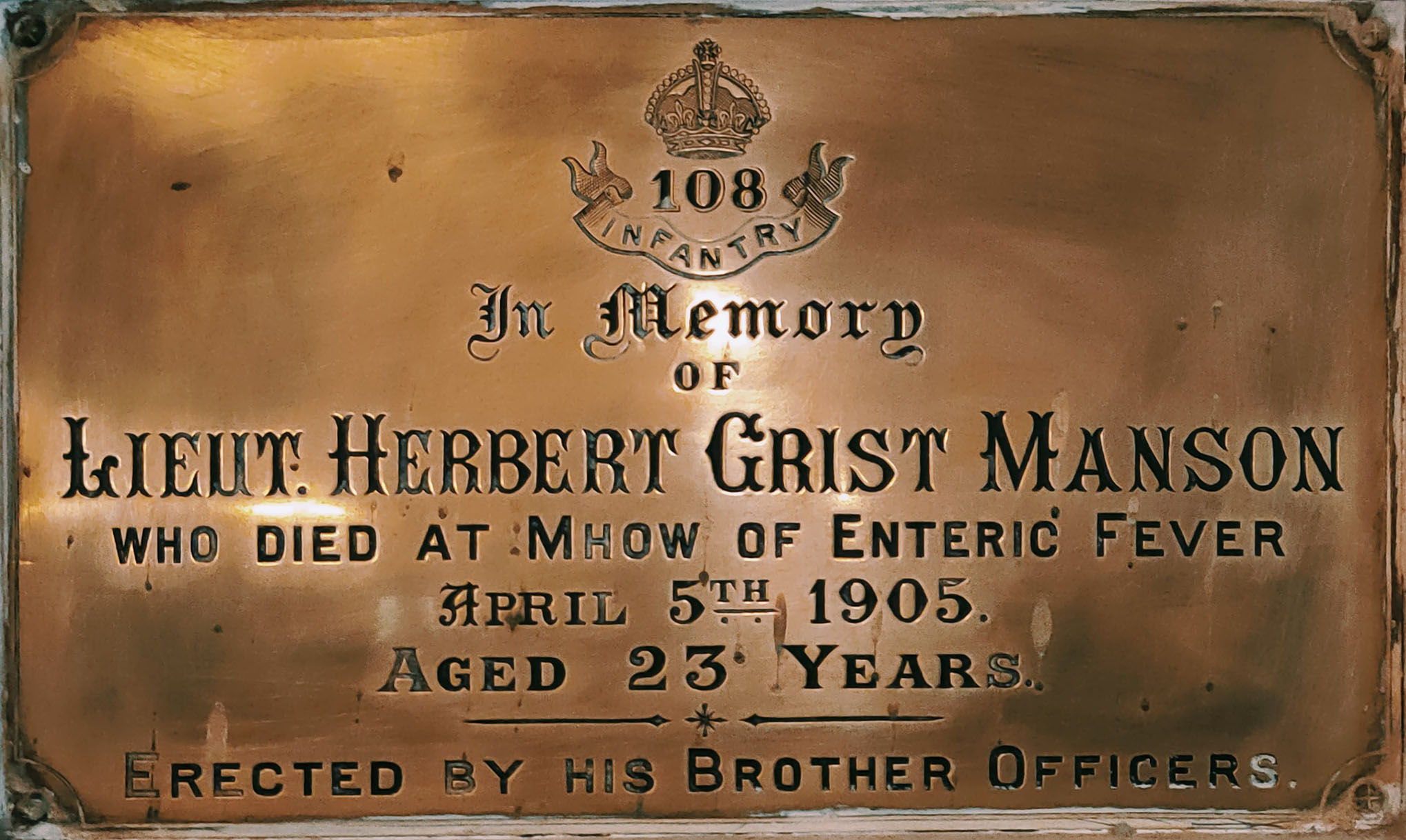
Lieutenant Herbert Grist Manson is honoured in this plaque, installed by his unit, The 108th Infantry

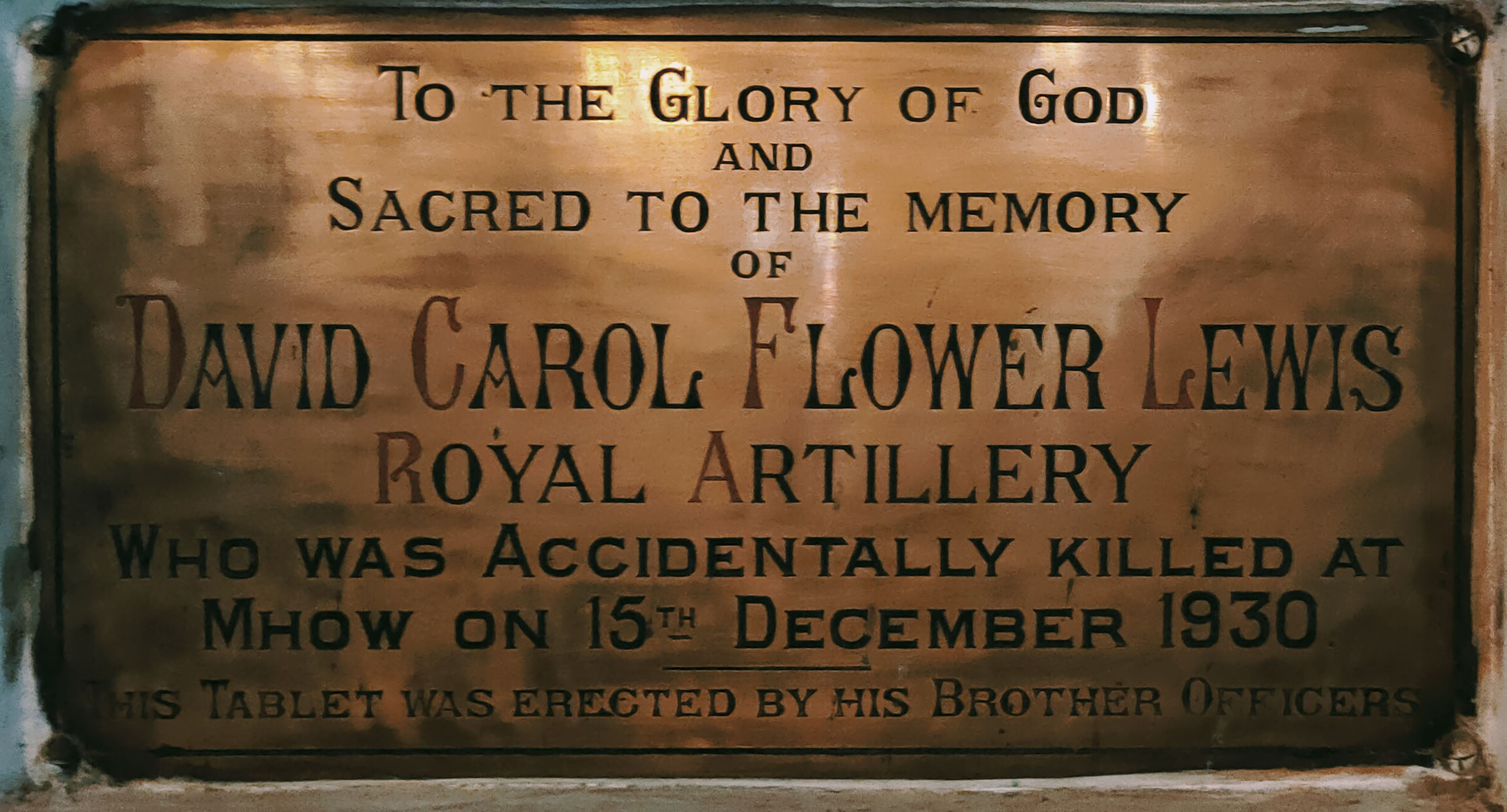
Lieutenant David Carol Flower Lewis of the Royal Artillery was killed accidentally in December 1930

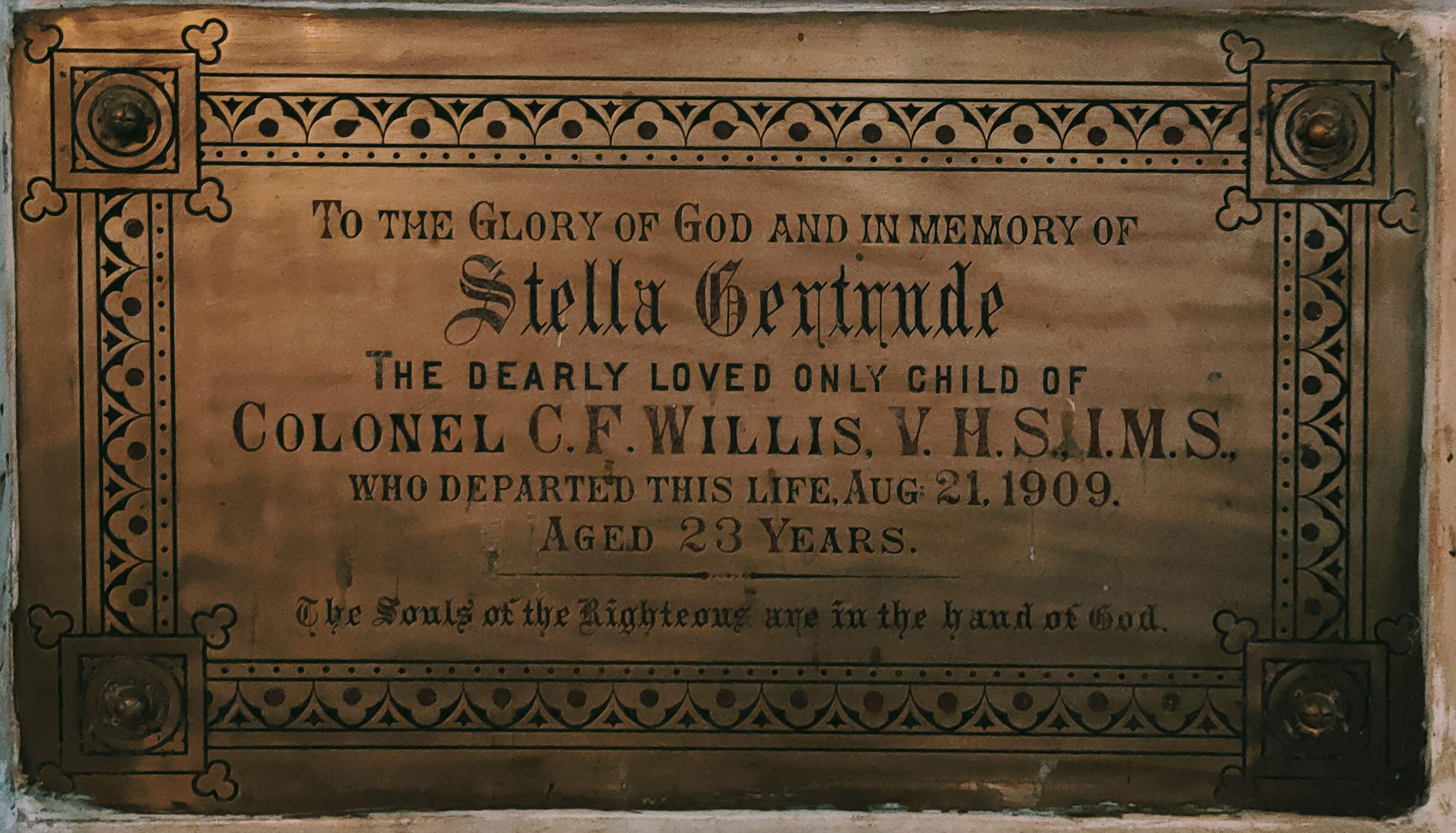
Stella, the only daughter of Colonel CF Wills of the Indian Medical Service finds mention in this plaque

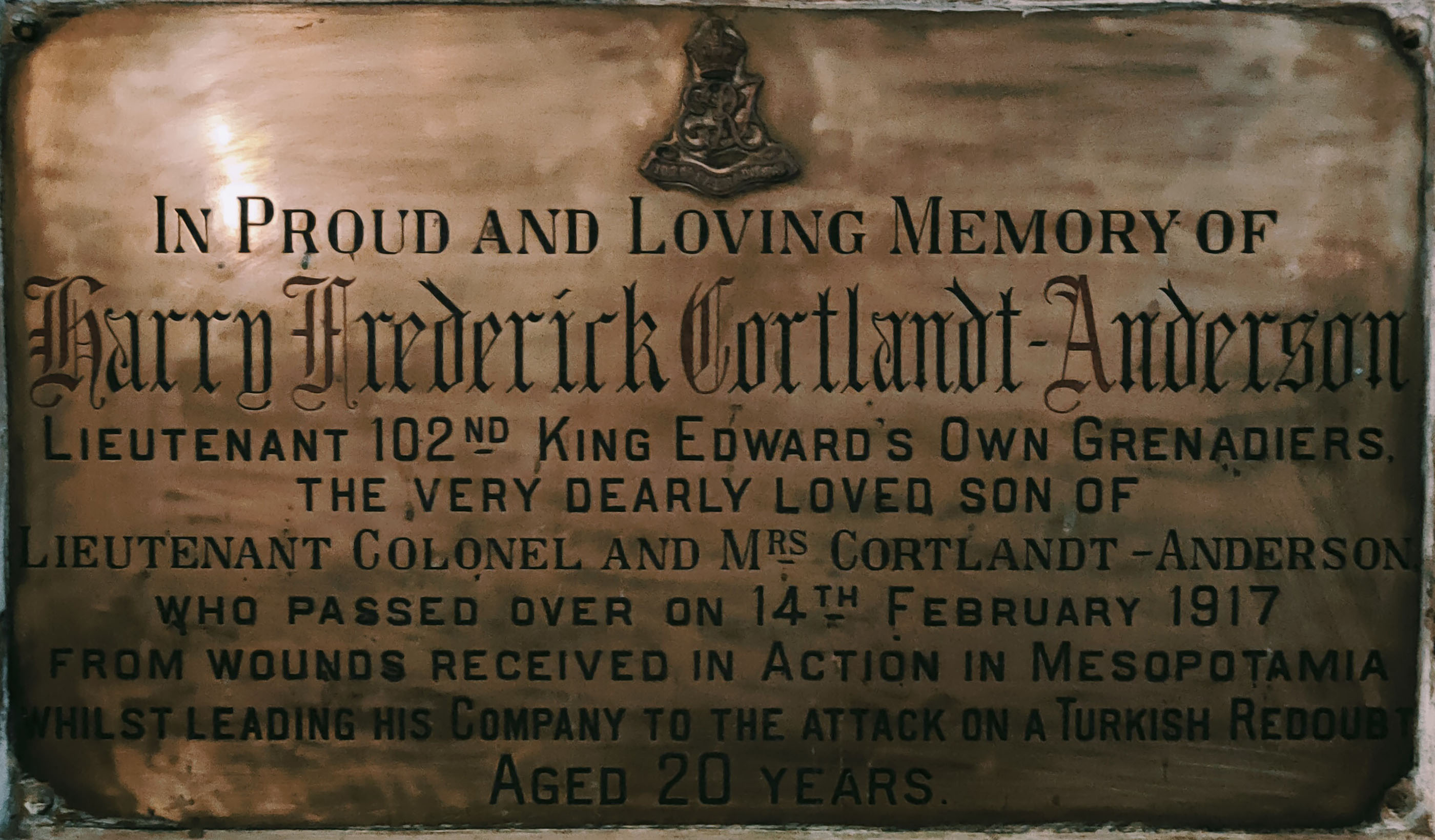
The 102nd (King Edward's Own) Grenadiers installed this plaque in memory of Lieutenant Harry Fredrick Cortlandt Anderson

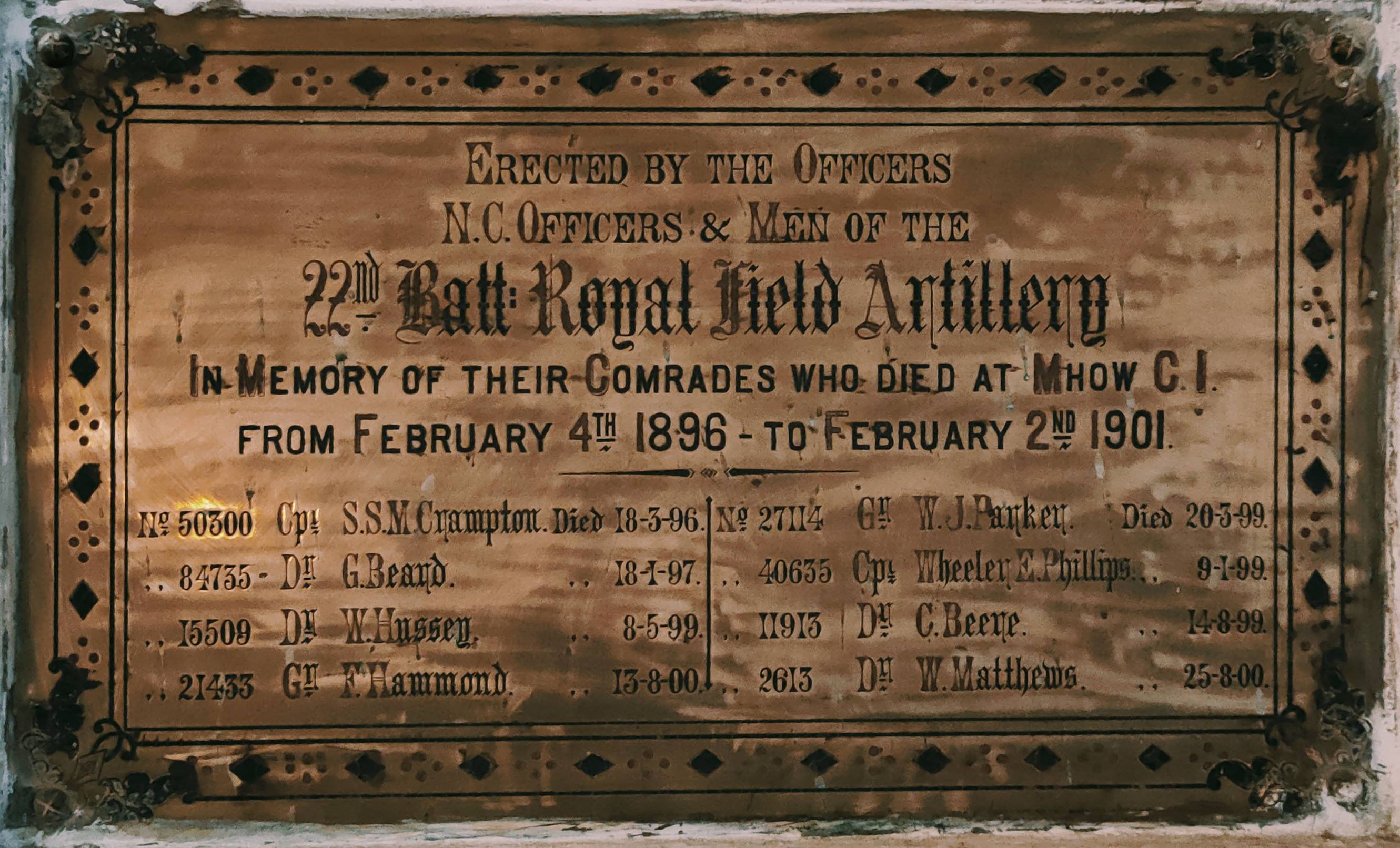
The 22nd Battery of the Royal Field Artillery was stationed at Mhow between 1896 and 1901

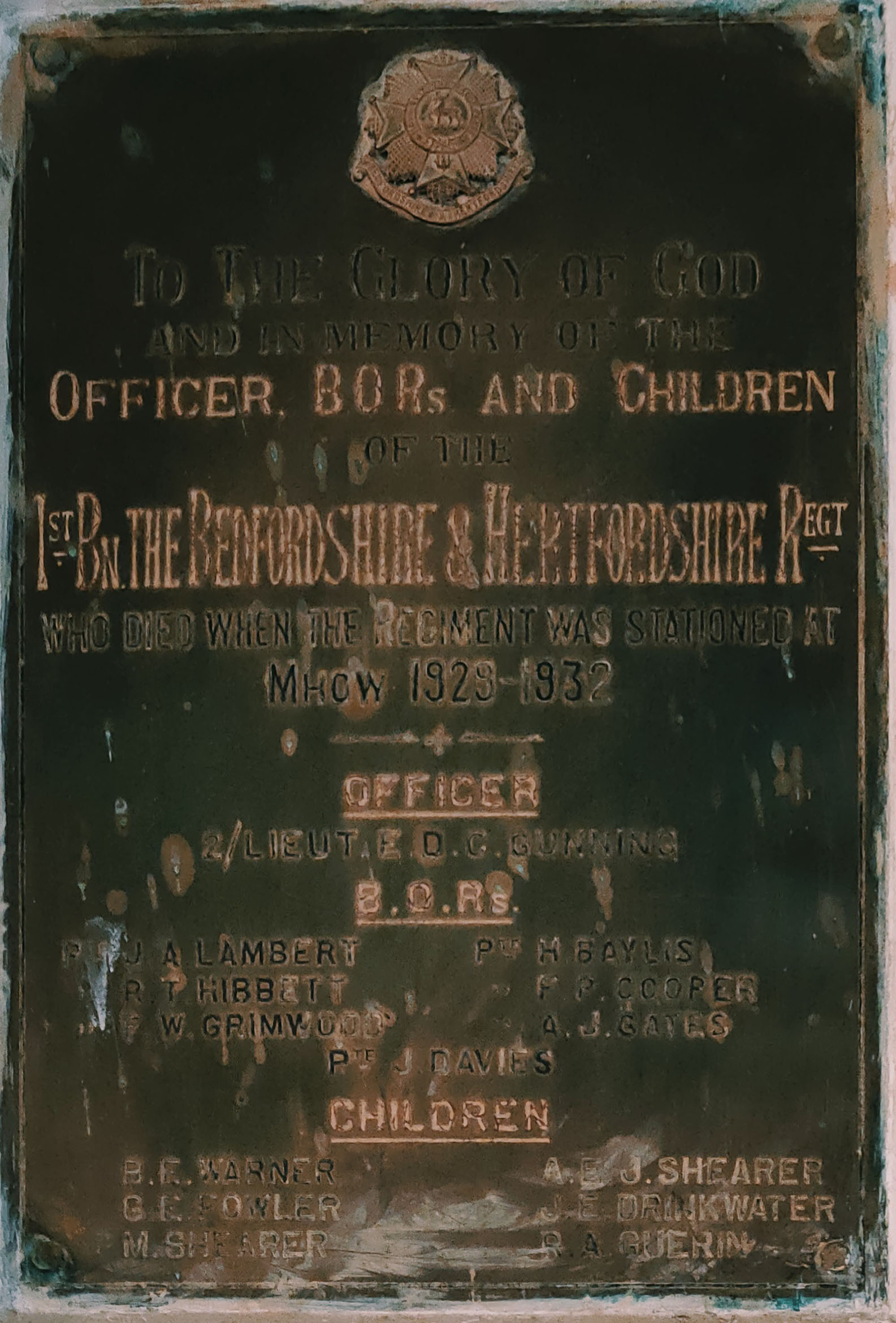
Plaque installed by The 1st Battalion the Bedfordshire and Hertfordshire Regiment

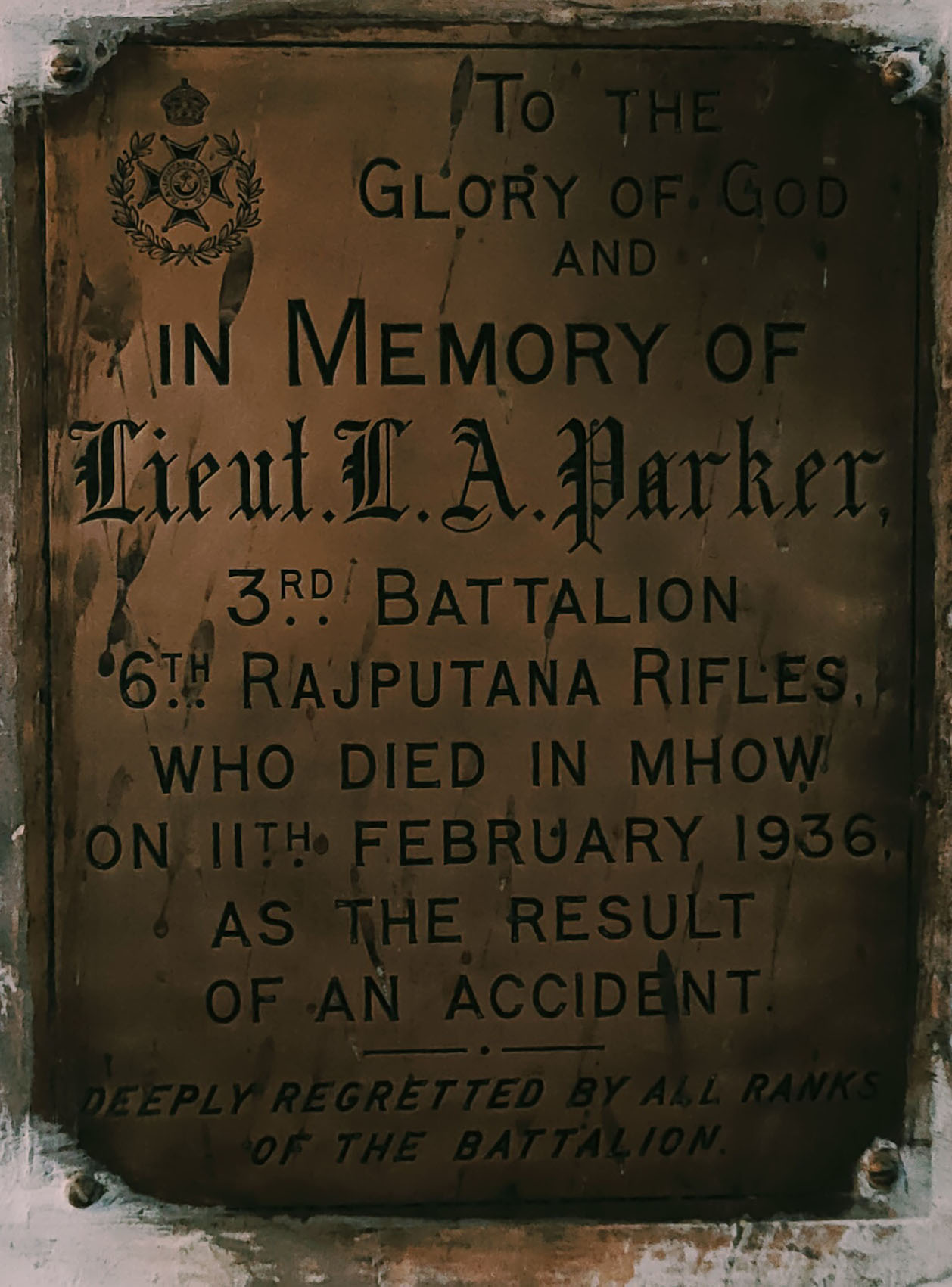
The 3rd Battalion the 6th Rajputana Rifles installed this plaque in memory of Lieutenant Parker, who died in an accident

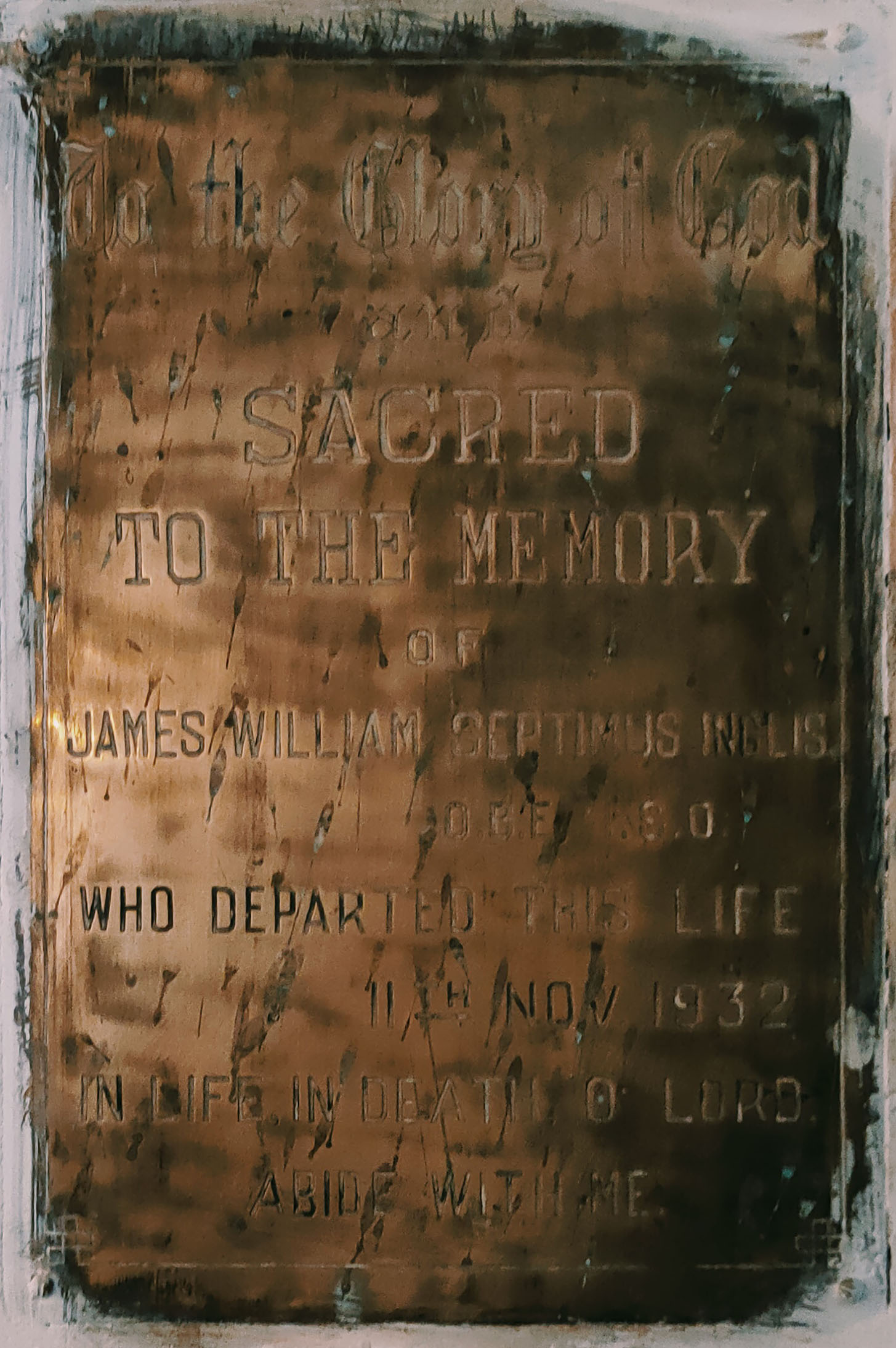
In memory of James William Septimus Inglis (not known if he was a serviceman)

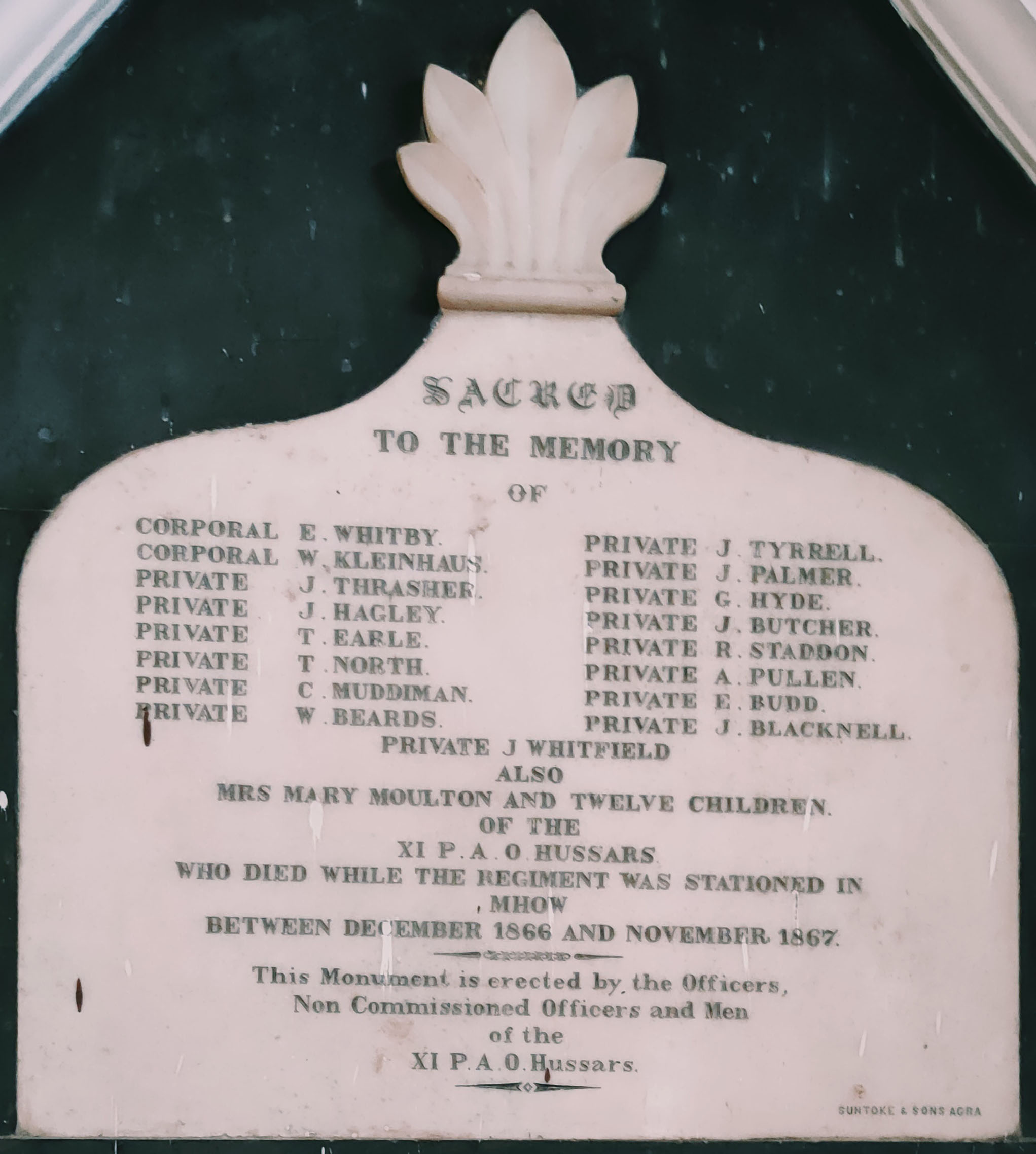
The 11th (Price Albert's Own) Hussars installed this white marble memorial during their short tenure in 1866-67

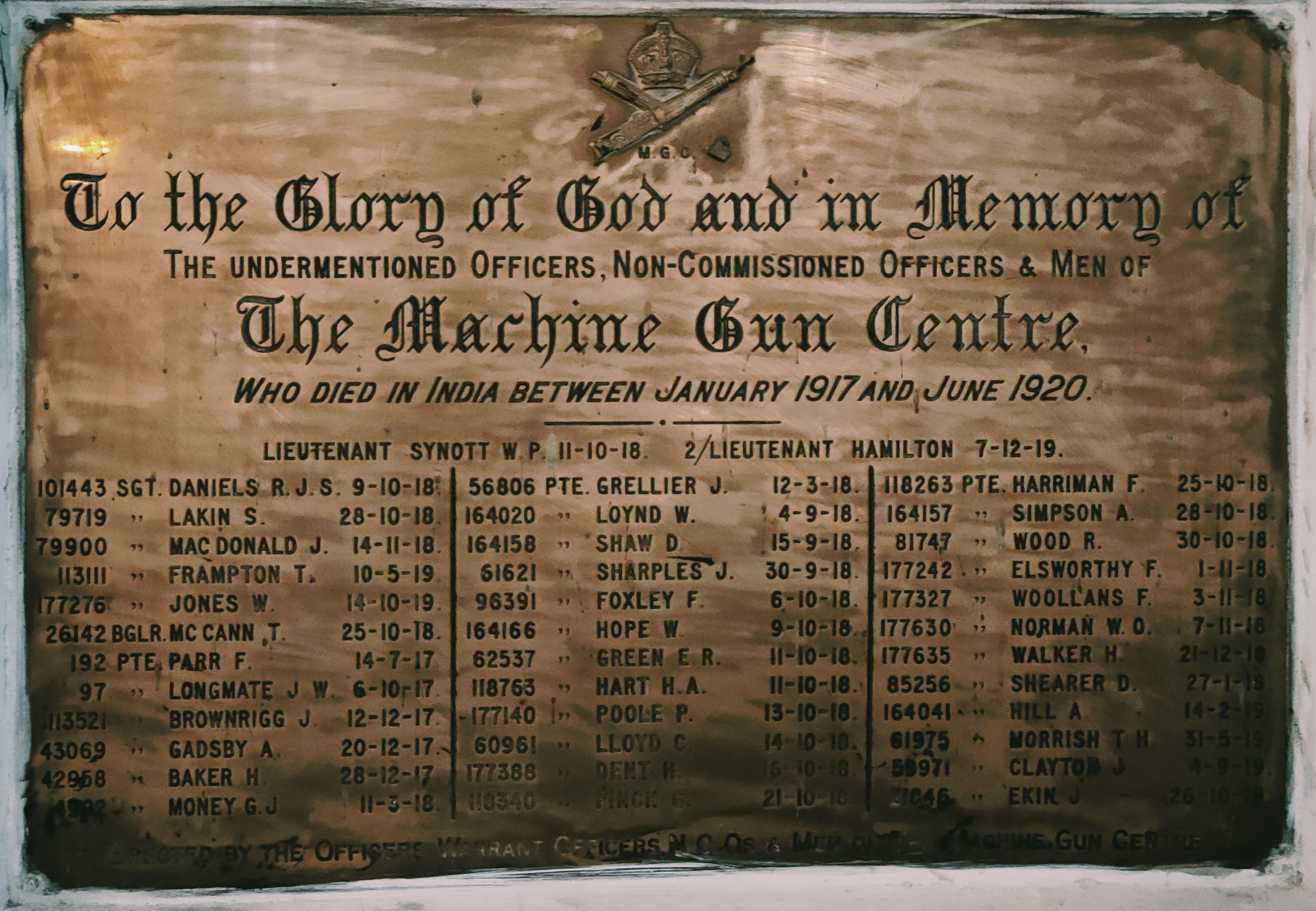
The Machine Gun Centre (now Mahar Regiment) installed this memorial

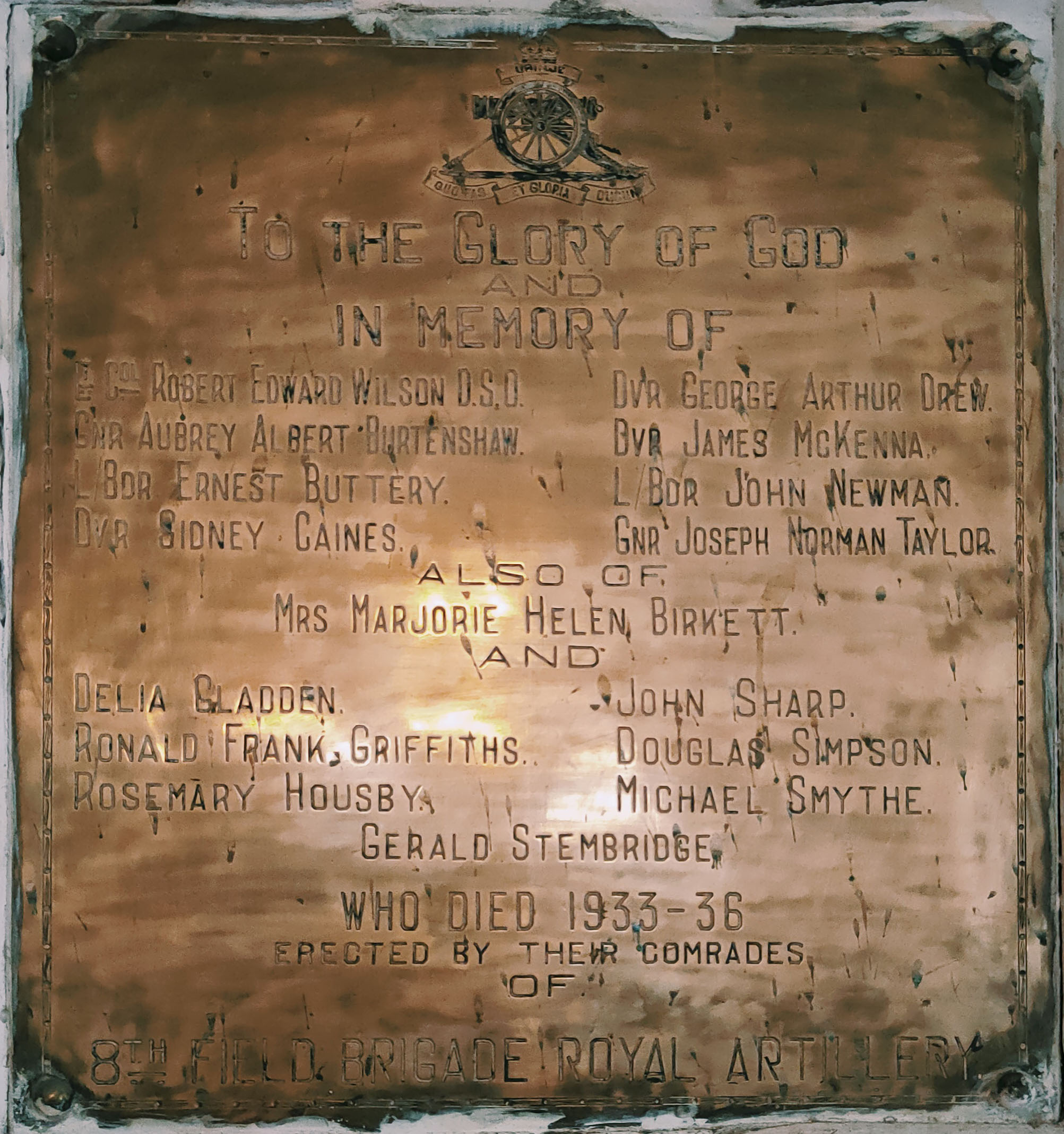
The 8th Field Brigade of the Royal Artillery was at Mhow between 1933 and 1936

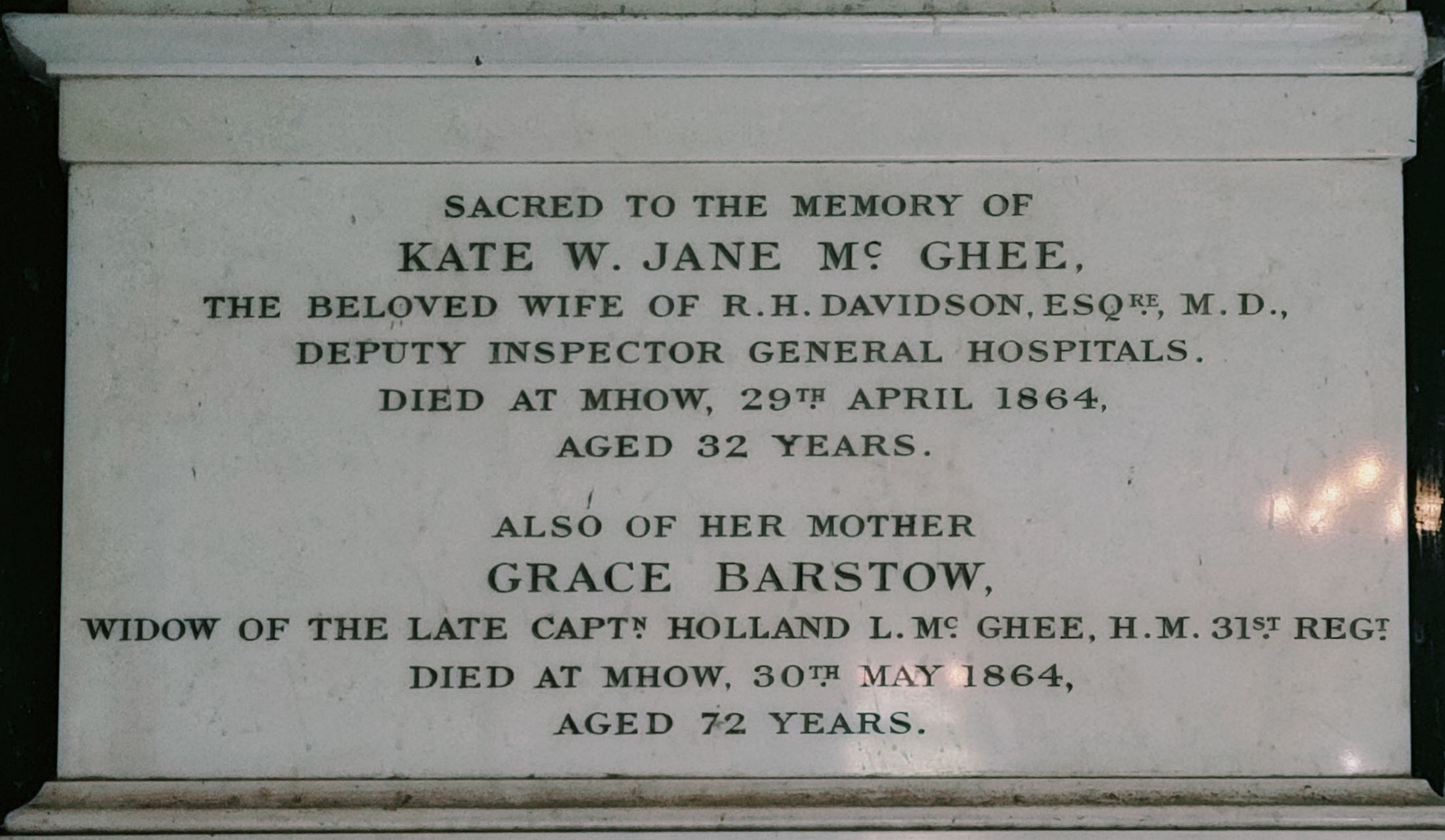
A White Marble memorial to Kate W Jane McGhee, Wife of RH Davidson, MD who was the Deputy Inspector General of Hospitals

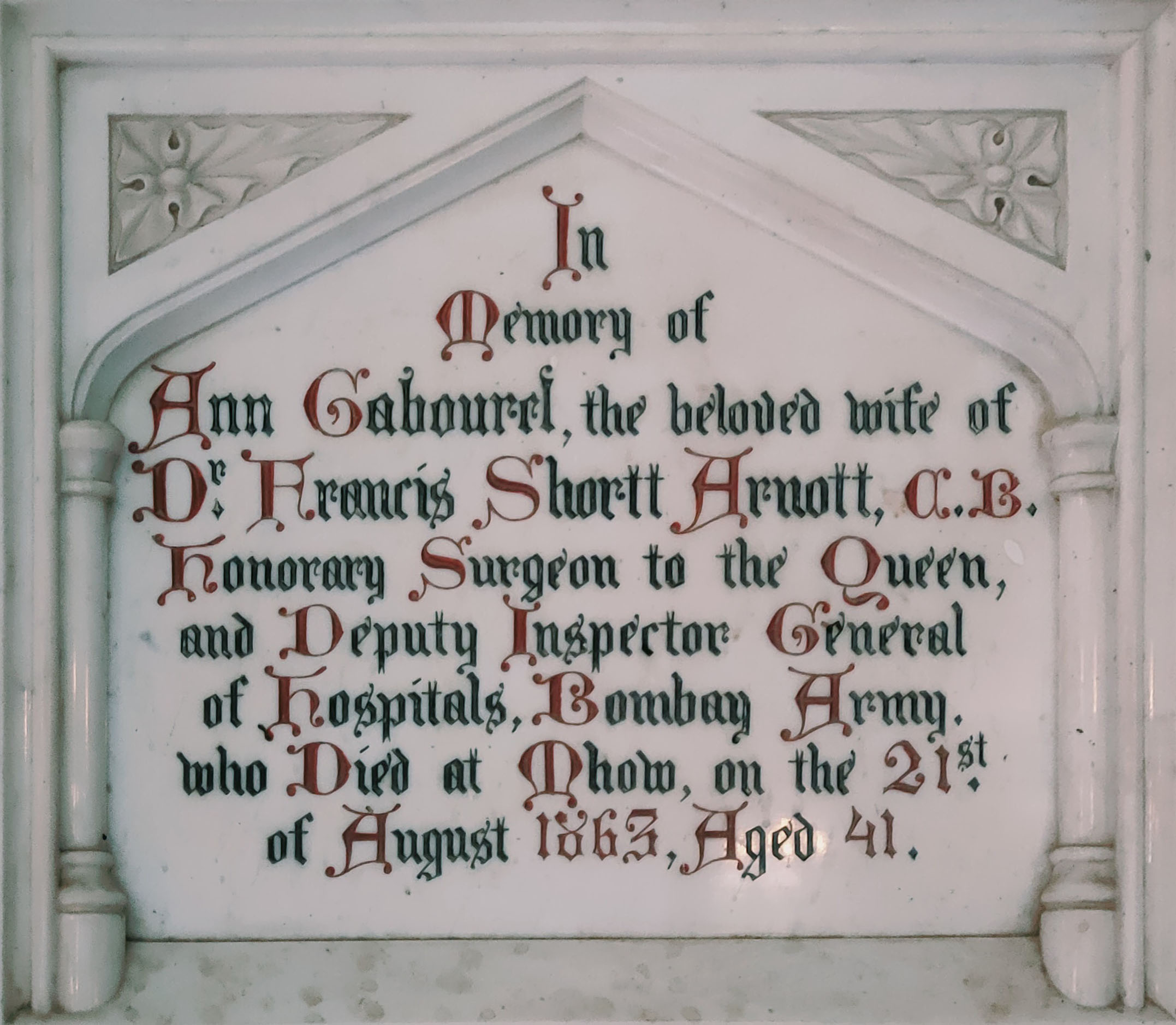
Ann was the wife of Dr Francis Shortt Arnott, the Deputy Inspector General of Hospitals

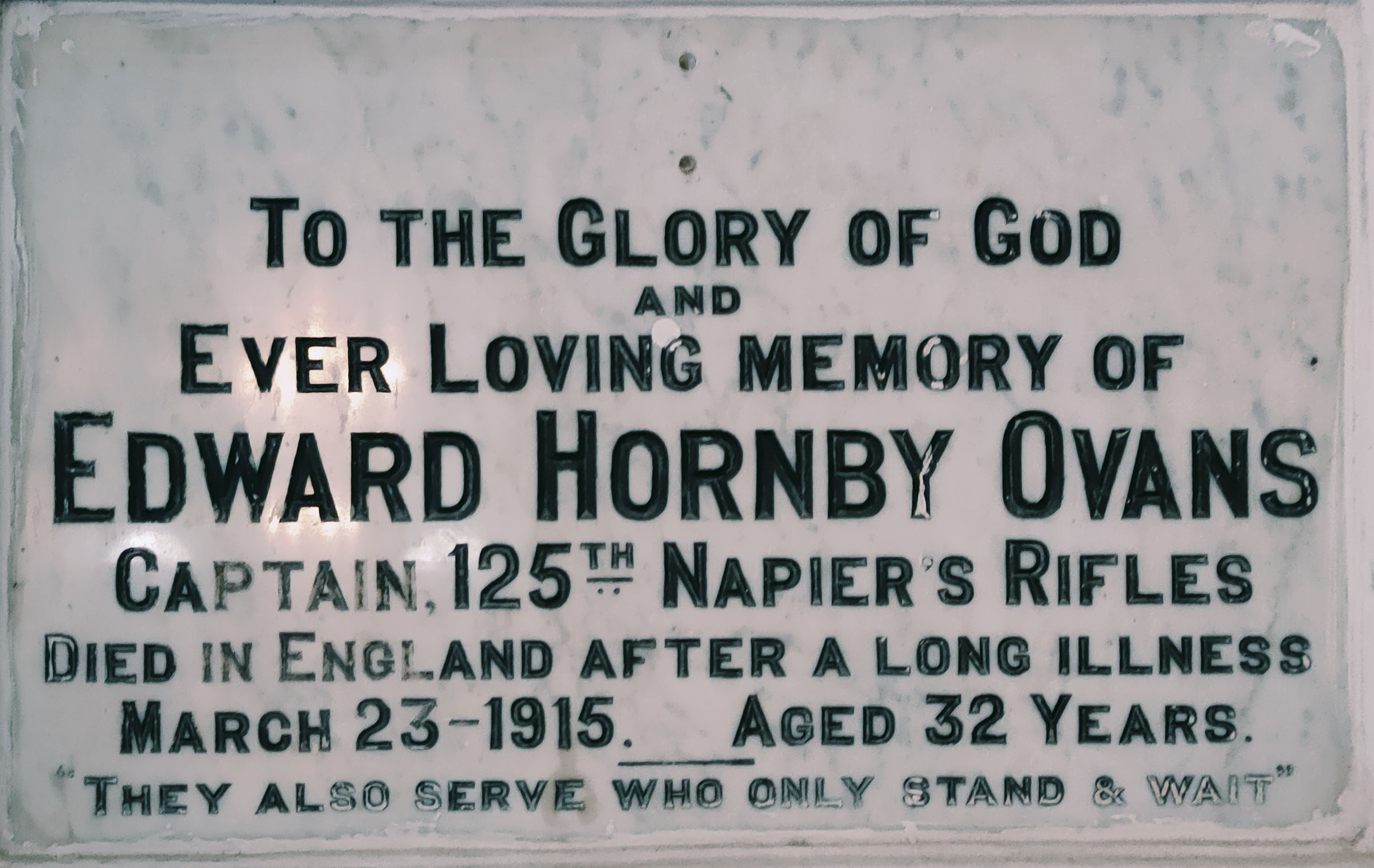
Captain Edward Hornby Ovans of the 125th (Napier) Rifles is commemorated in this plaque

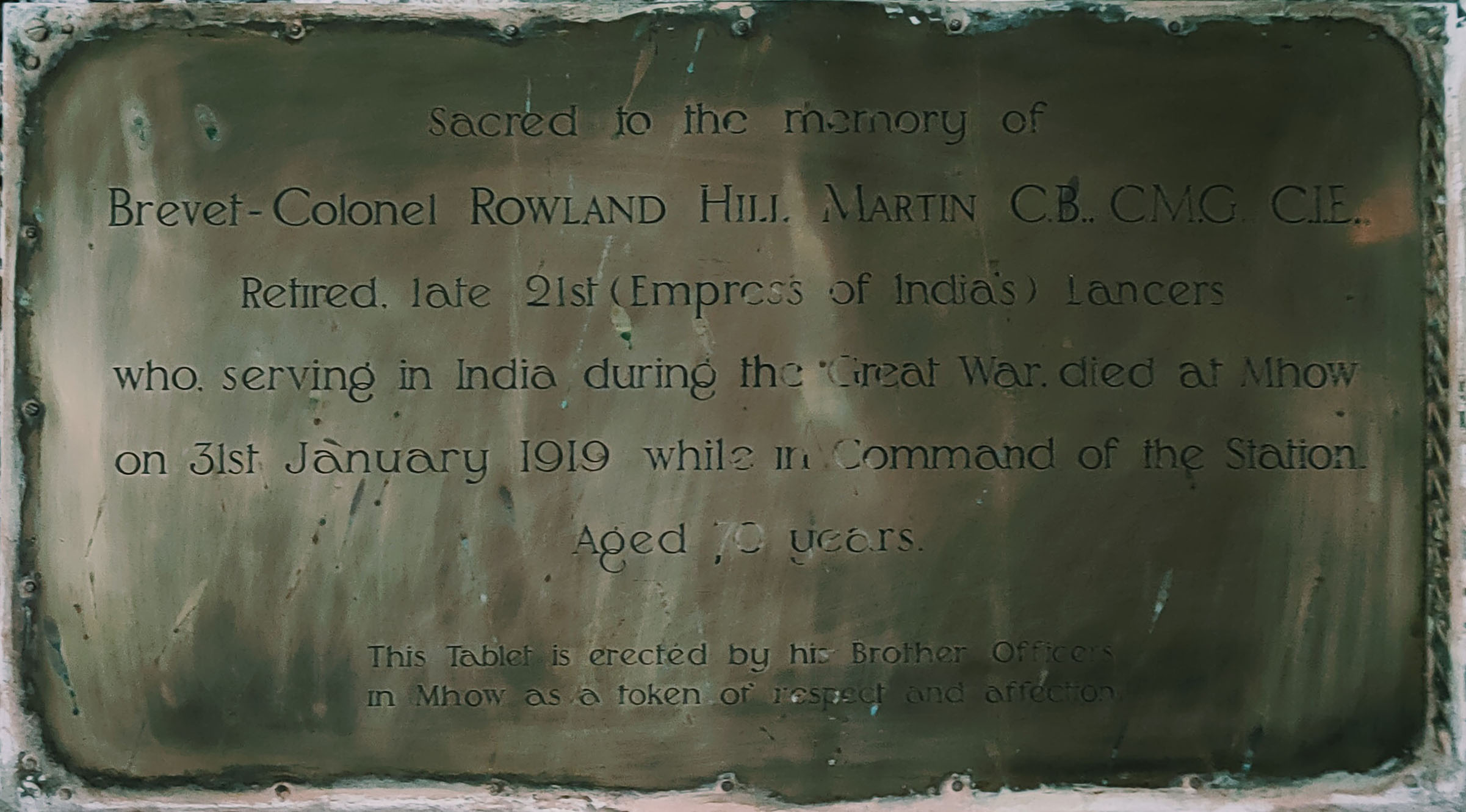
The 21st (Empress of India's) Lancers installed this in memory of Brevet-Colonel Rowland Hill Martin, who held the honorary rank

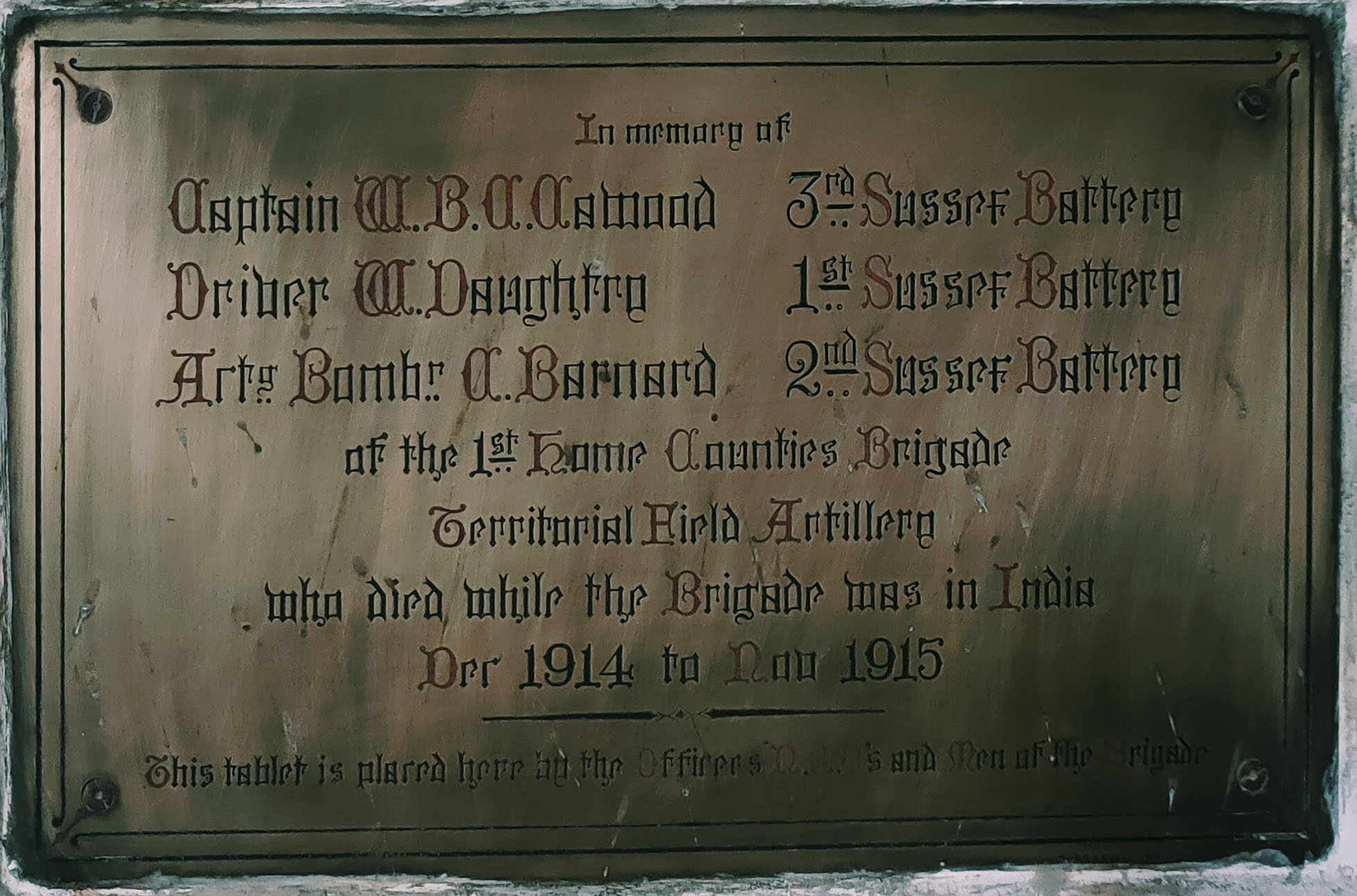
The 1st Home Counties Brigade of the Territorial Field Artillery (presumably a part of the 1st Sussex Artillery Volunteers) installed this brass plaque

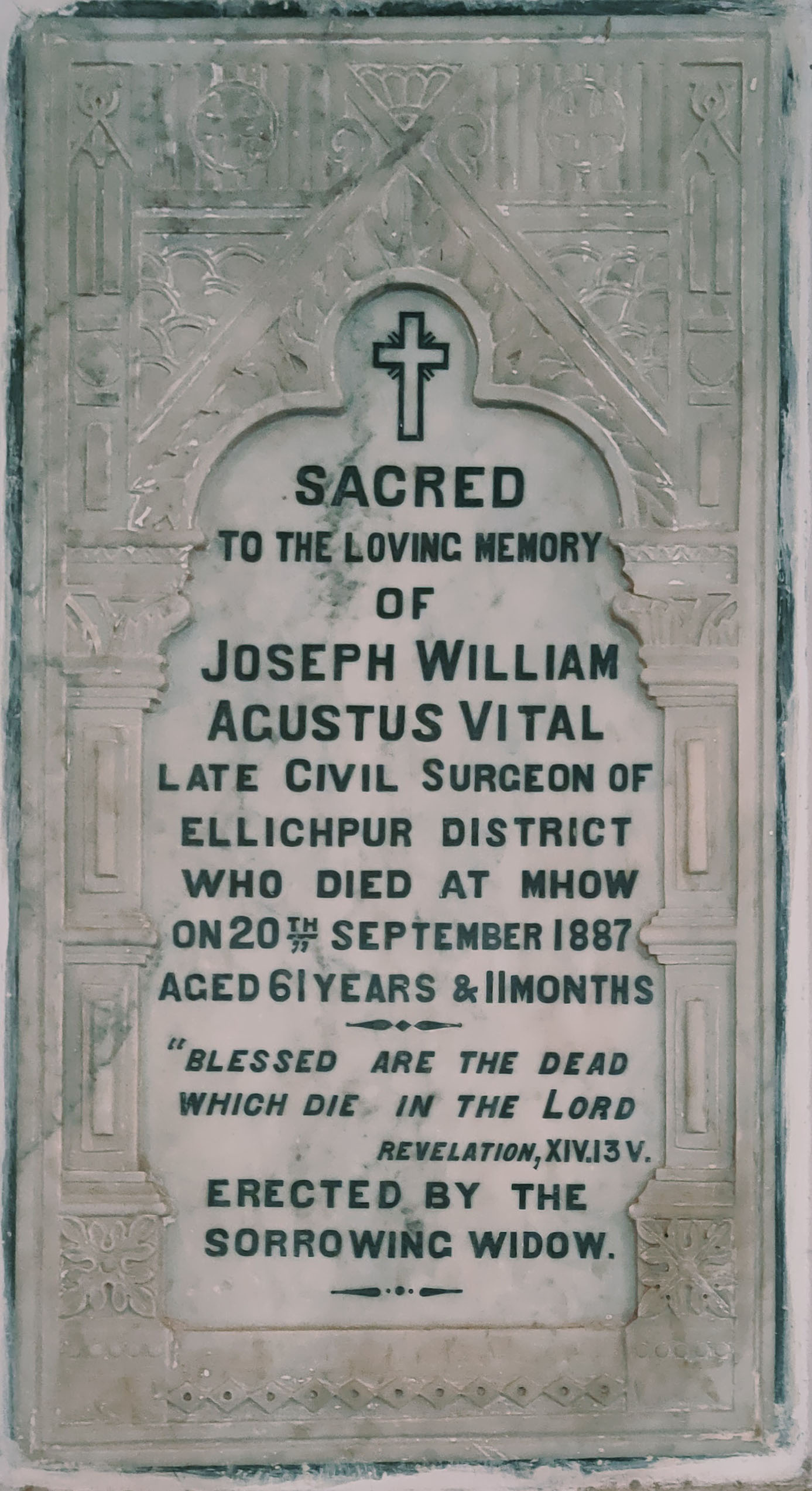
The widow of Joseph William Augustus Vital, the Civil Surgeon of Mhow installed this white marble plaque in memory of her late husband

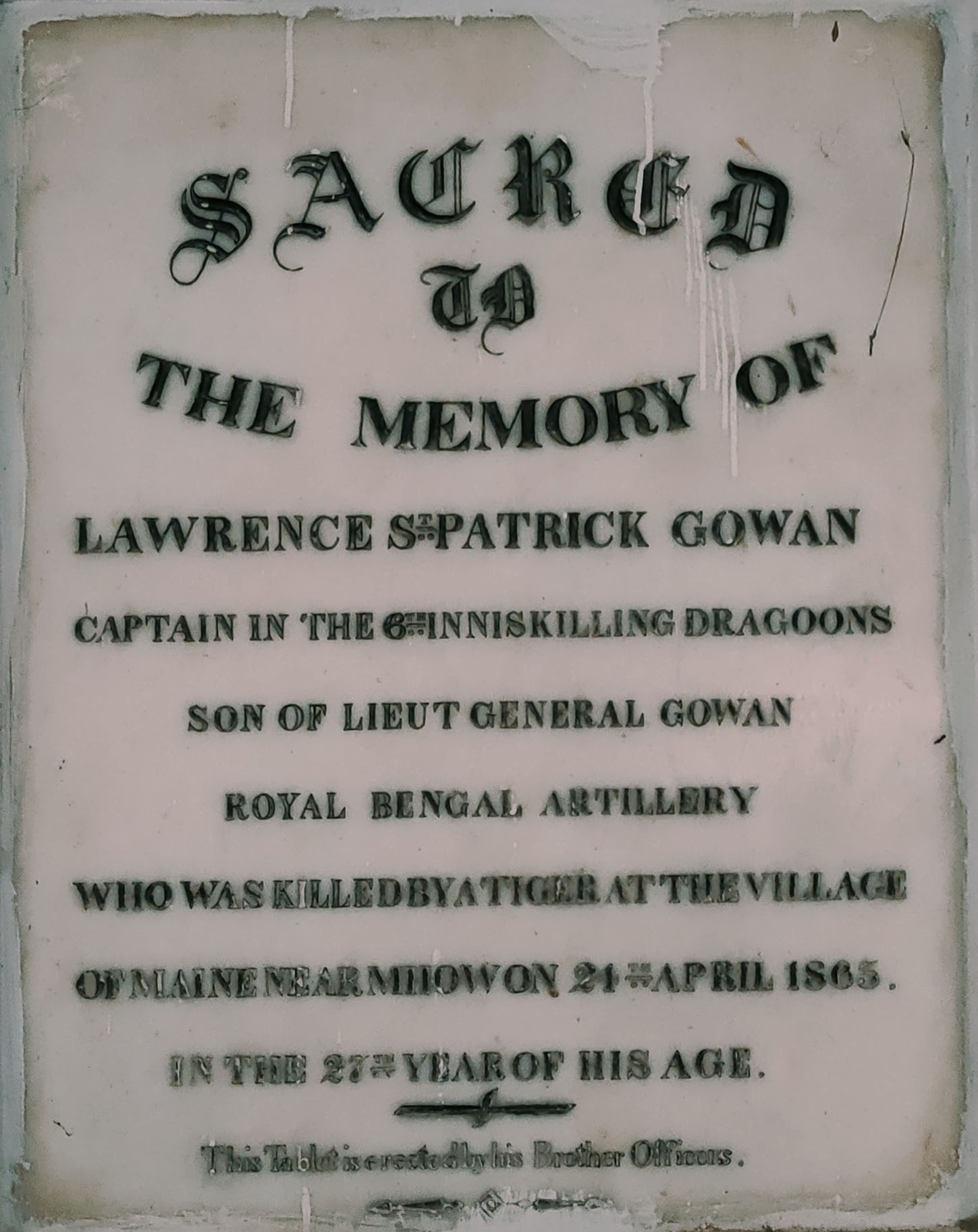
This inscription on white marble is in memory of an officer killed by a tiger at the village of Maine (now known as Men), south of Mhow.

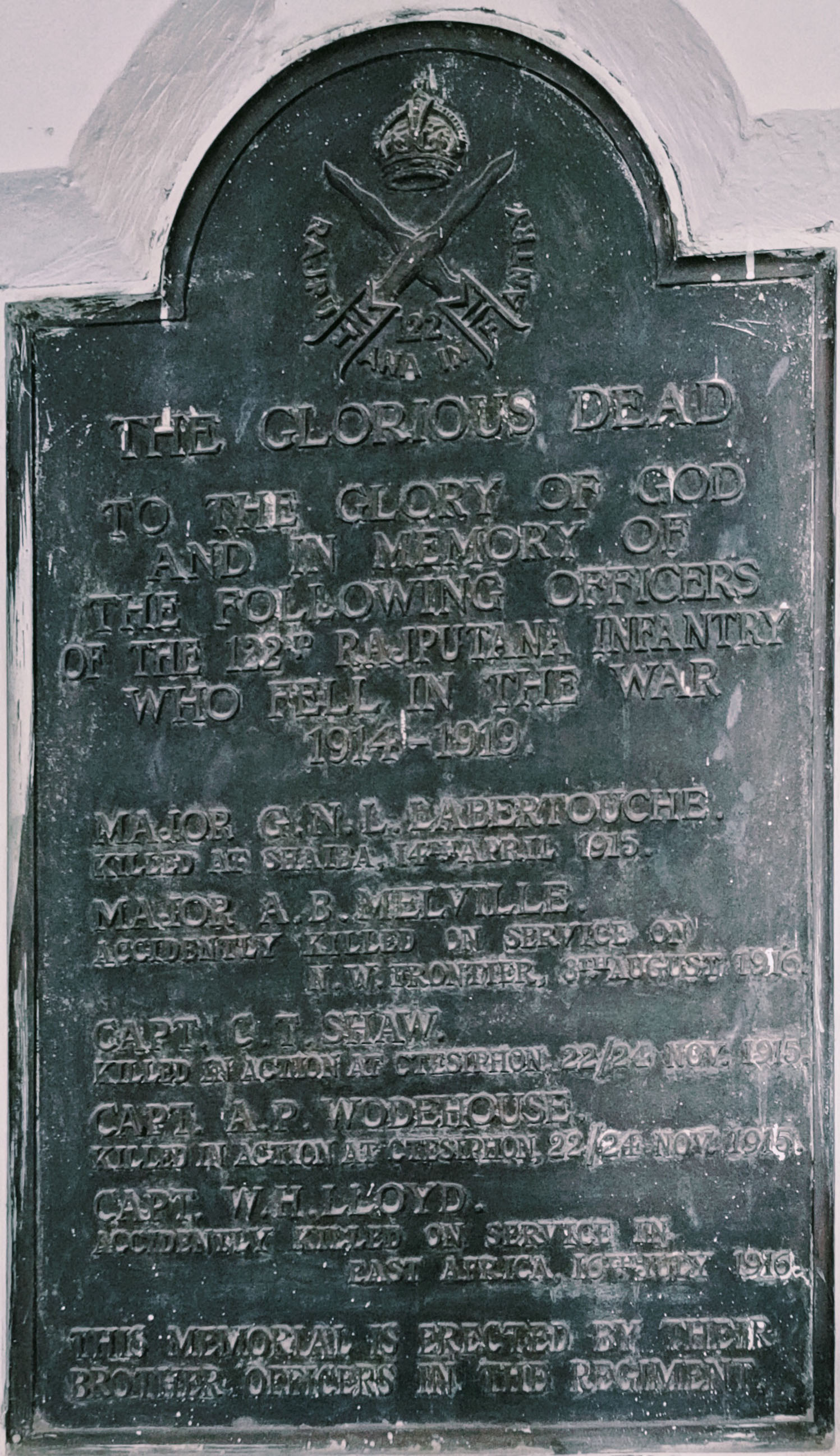
The 122nd Rajputana Infantry erected this bronze plate in memory of their comrades who fell during World War I.

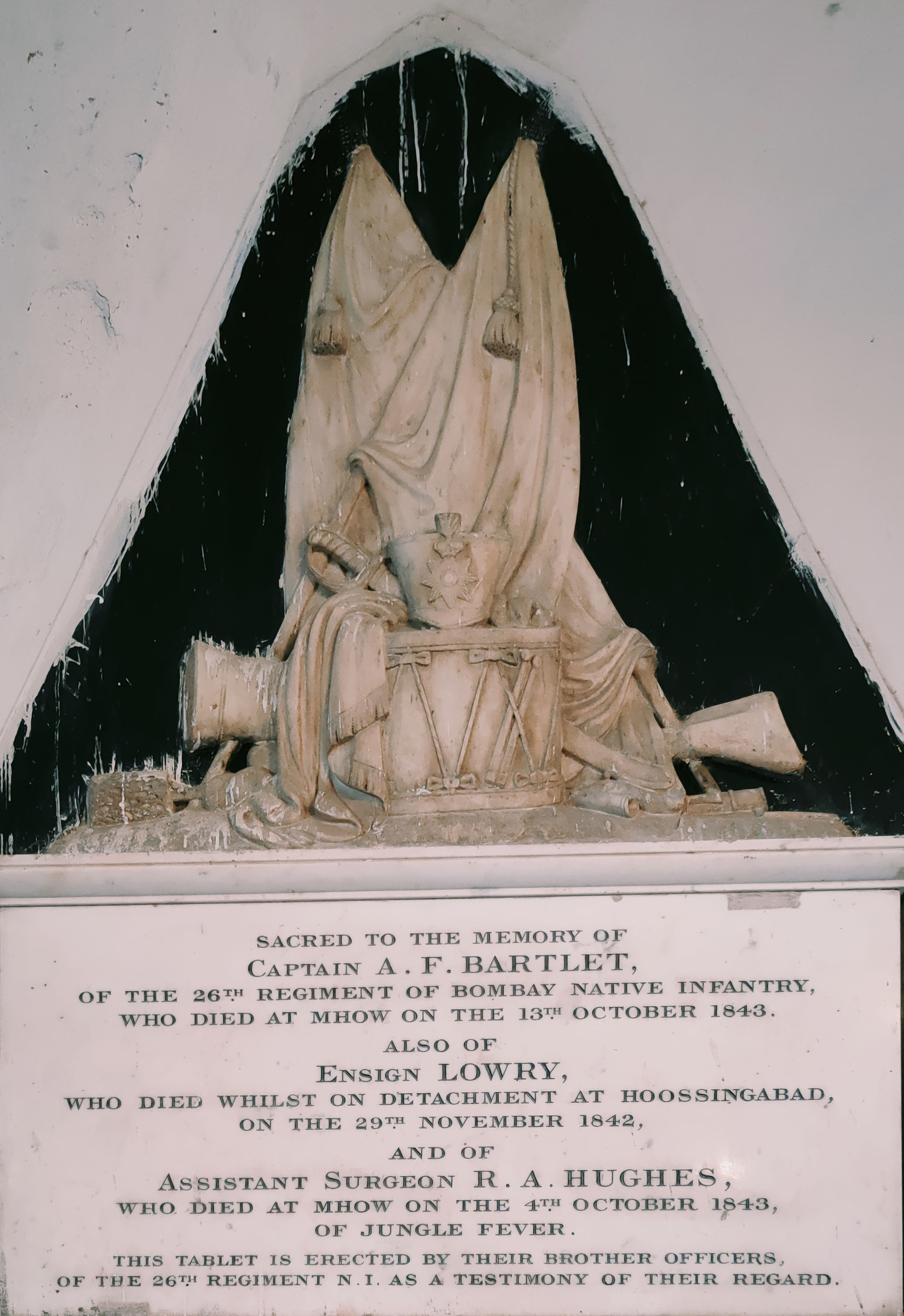
The 26th Regiment of the Bombay Native Infantry installed this white marble plaque in memory of men who died of "Jungle Fever" in 1843

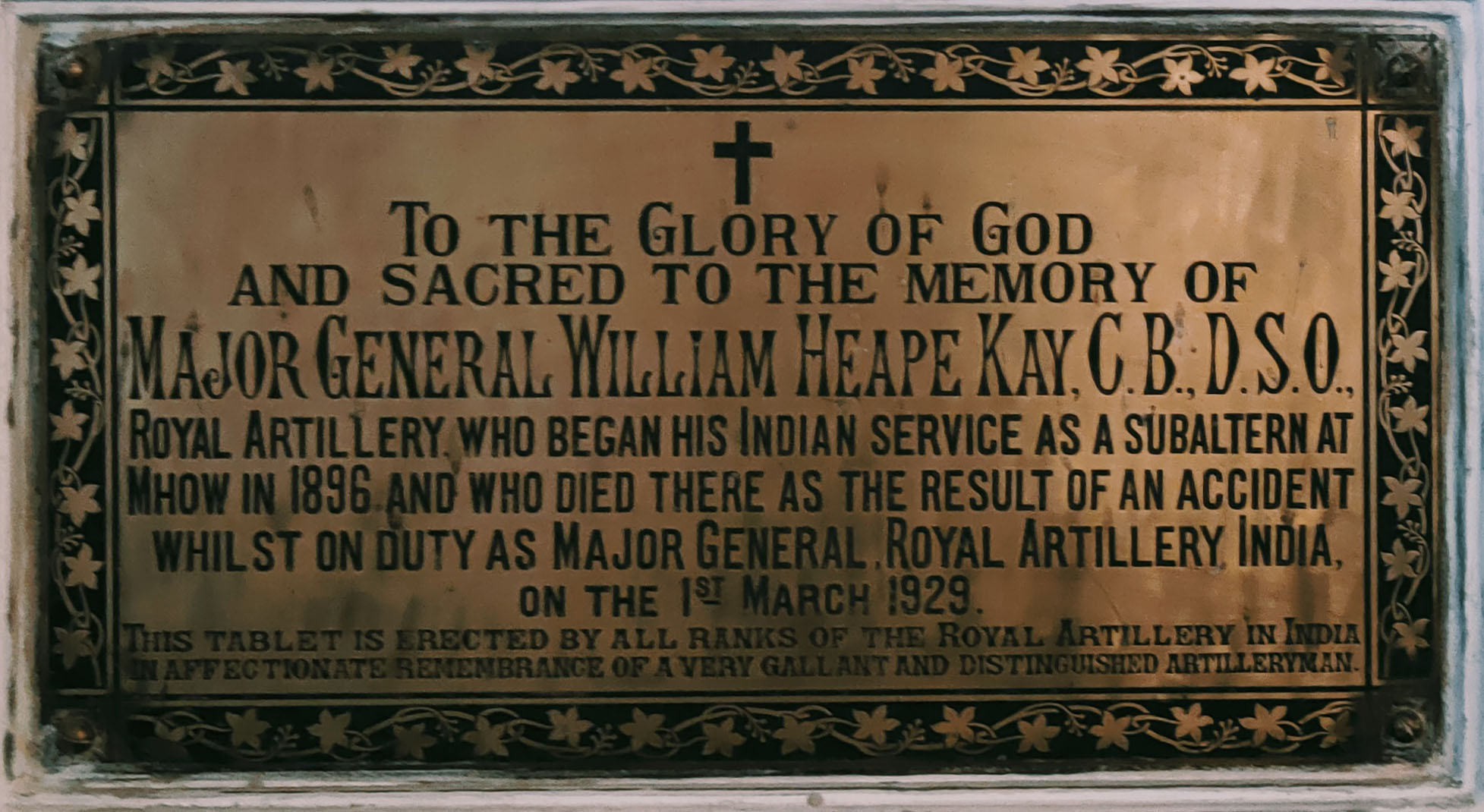
This brass plaque is in memory of Major General William Heape Kay of the Royal Artillery who began his Indian service at Mhow in 1896 and subsequently died in an accident here in 1929

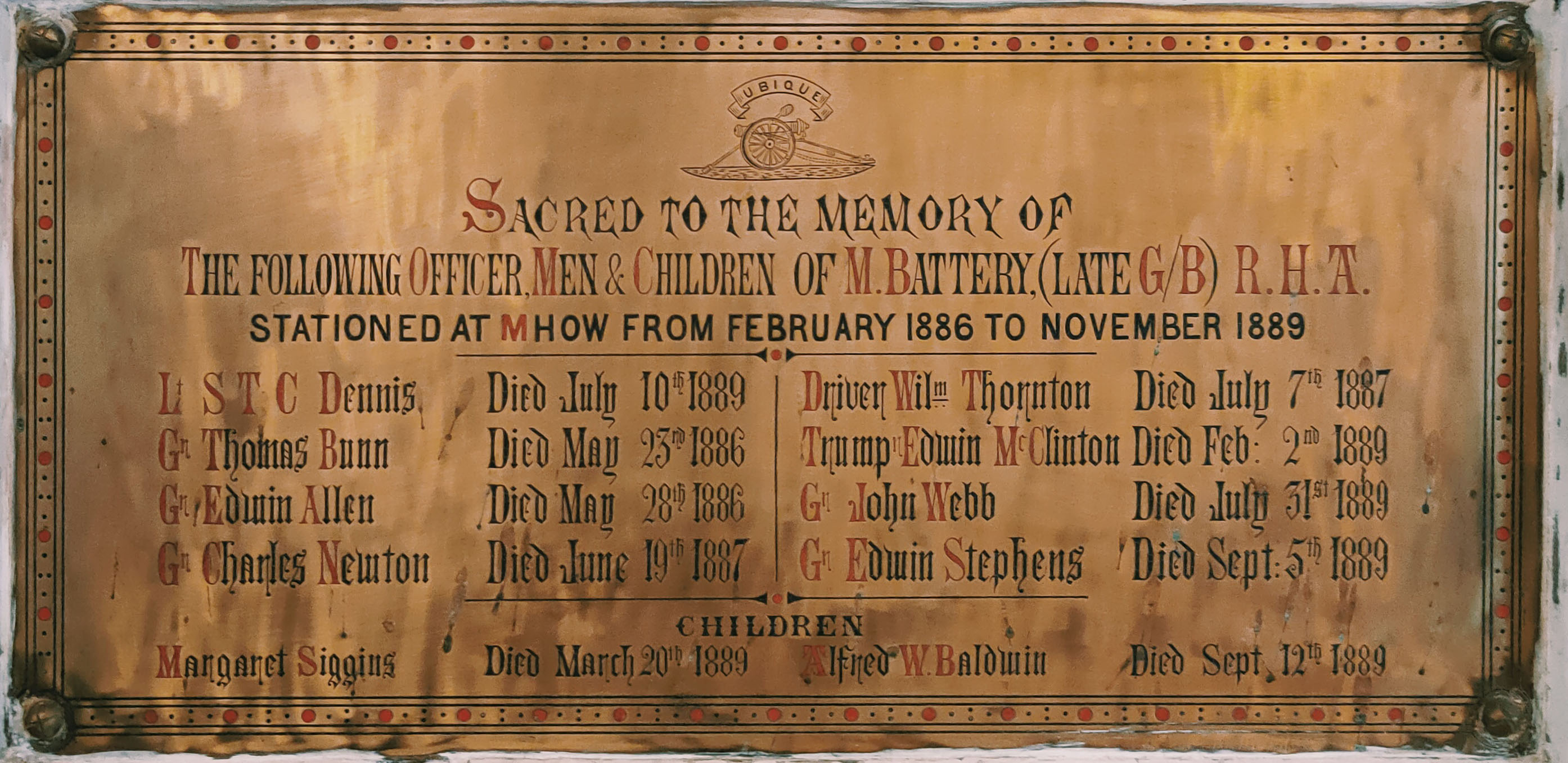
M (Mike) Battery of the Royal Horse Artillery was stationed at Mhow from 1886 to 1889 and installed this brass plaque

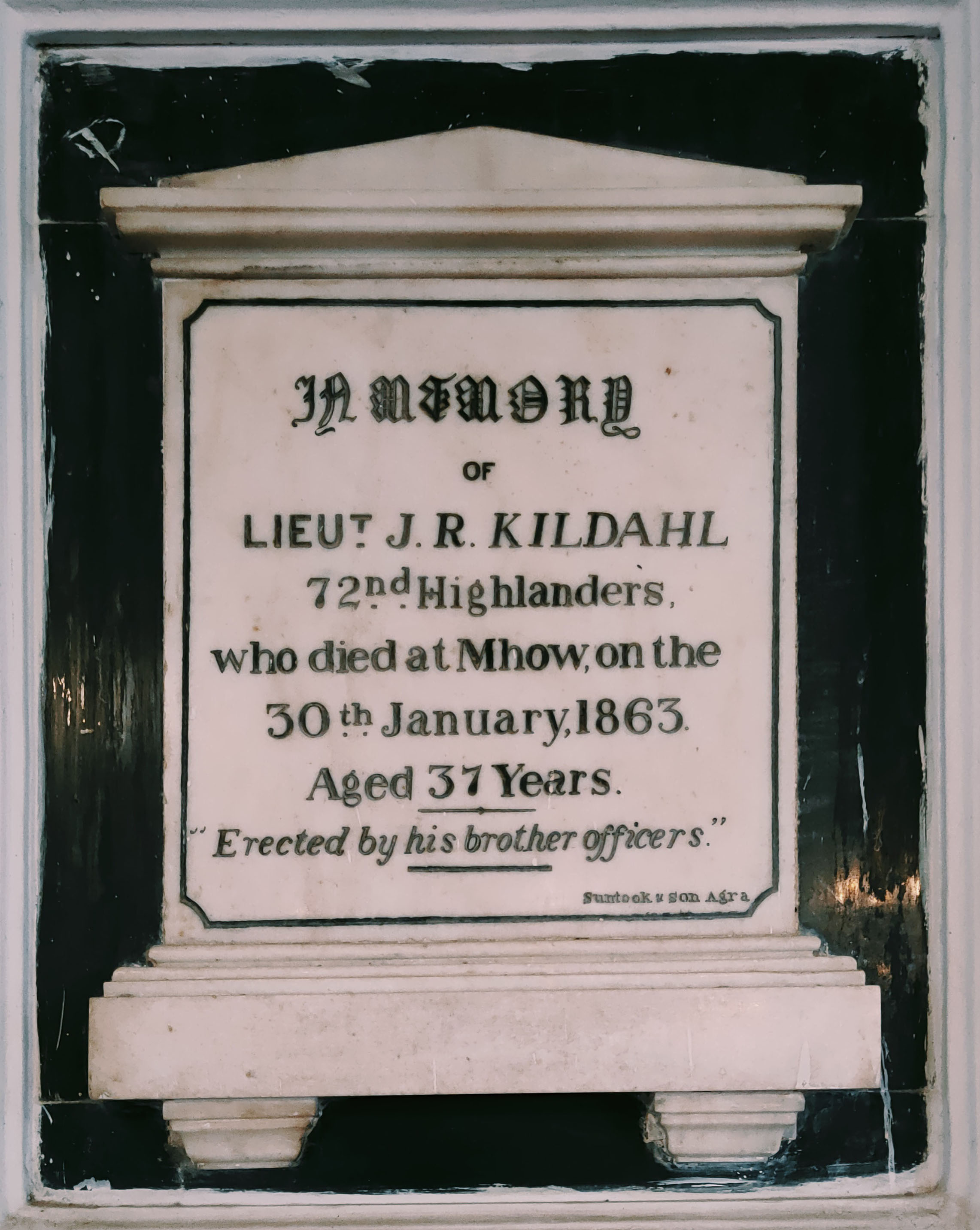
The brother officers of Lieutenant JR Kildahl installed this white marble plaque in his memory in 1863

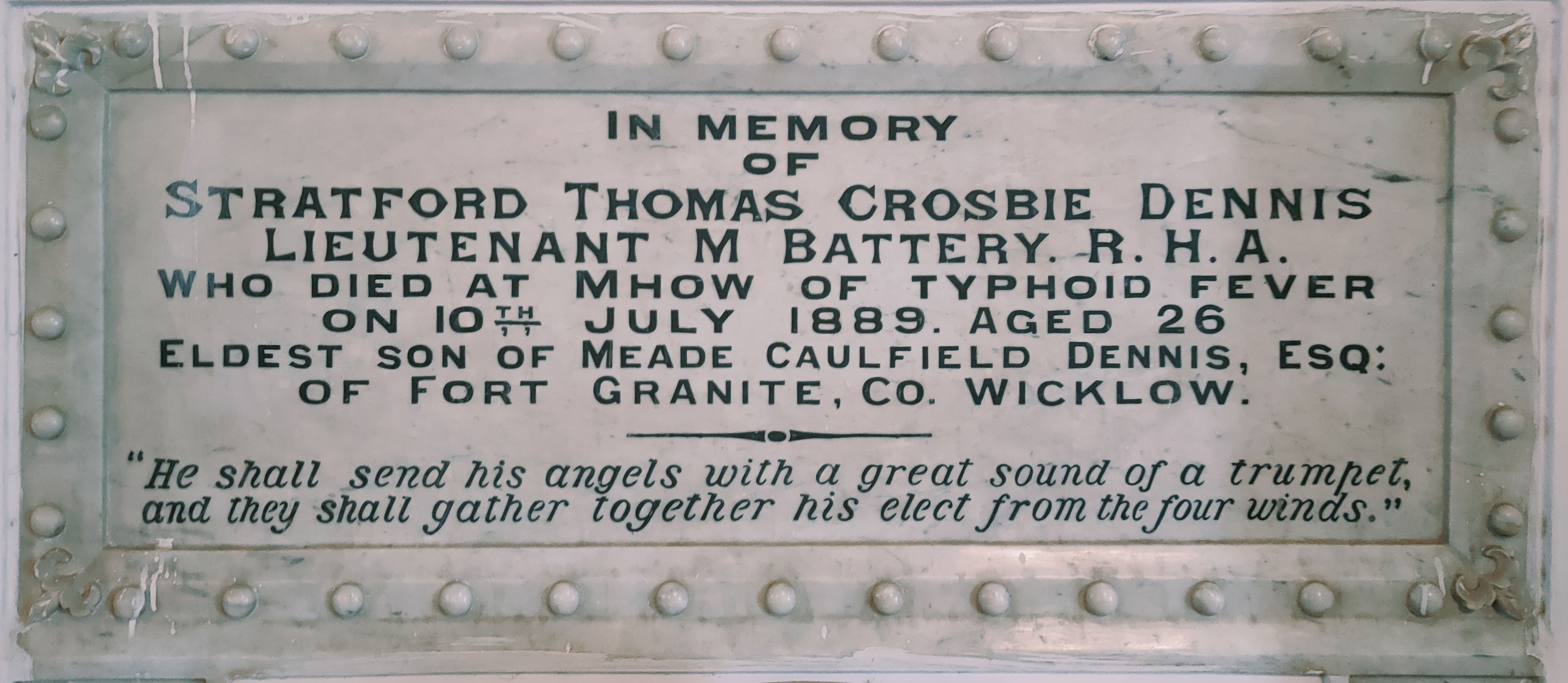
M (Mike) Battery of the Royal Horse Artillery placed this marble plaque in memory of Lieutenant Stratford Thomas Crosby Dennis, who died of Typhoid at Mhow in 1889

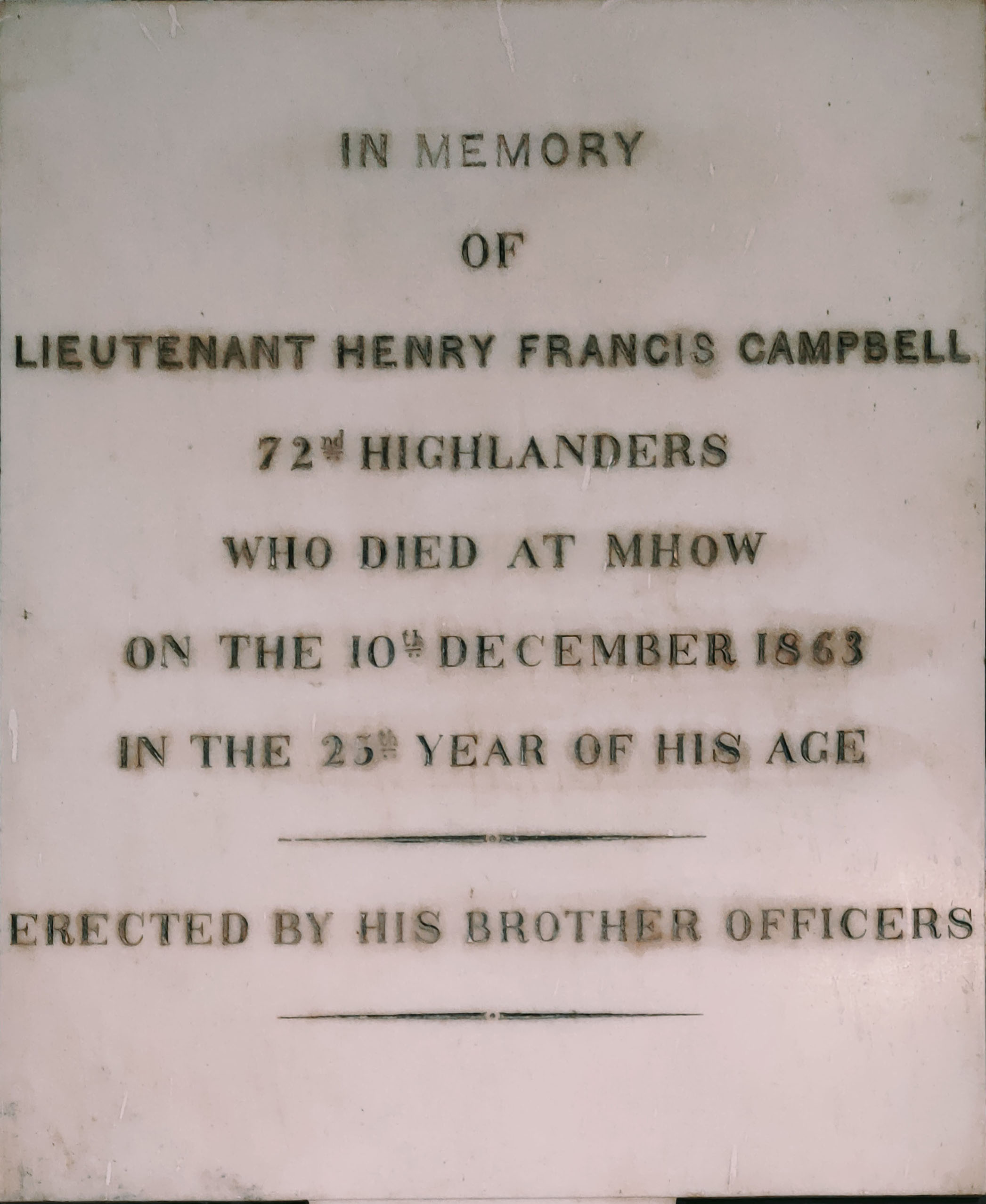
The Highlanders placed this marble plaque in memory of Lieutenant Henry Francis Campbell of their regiment

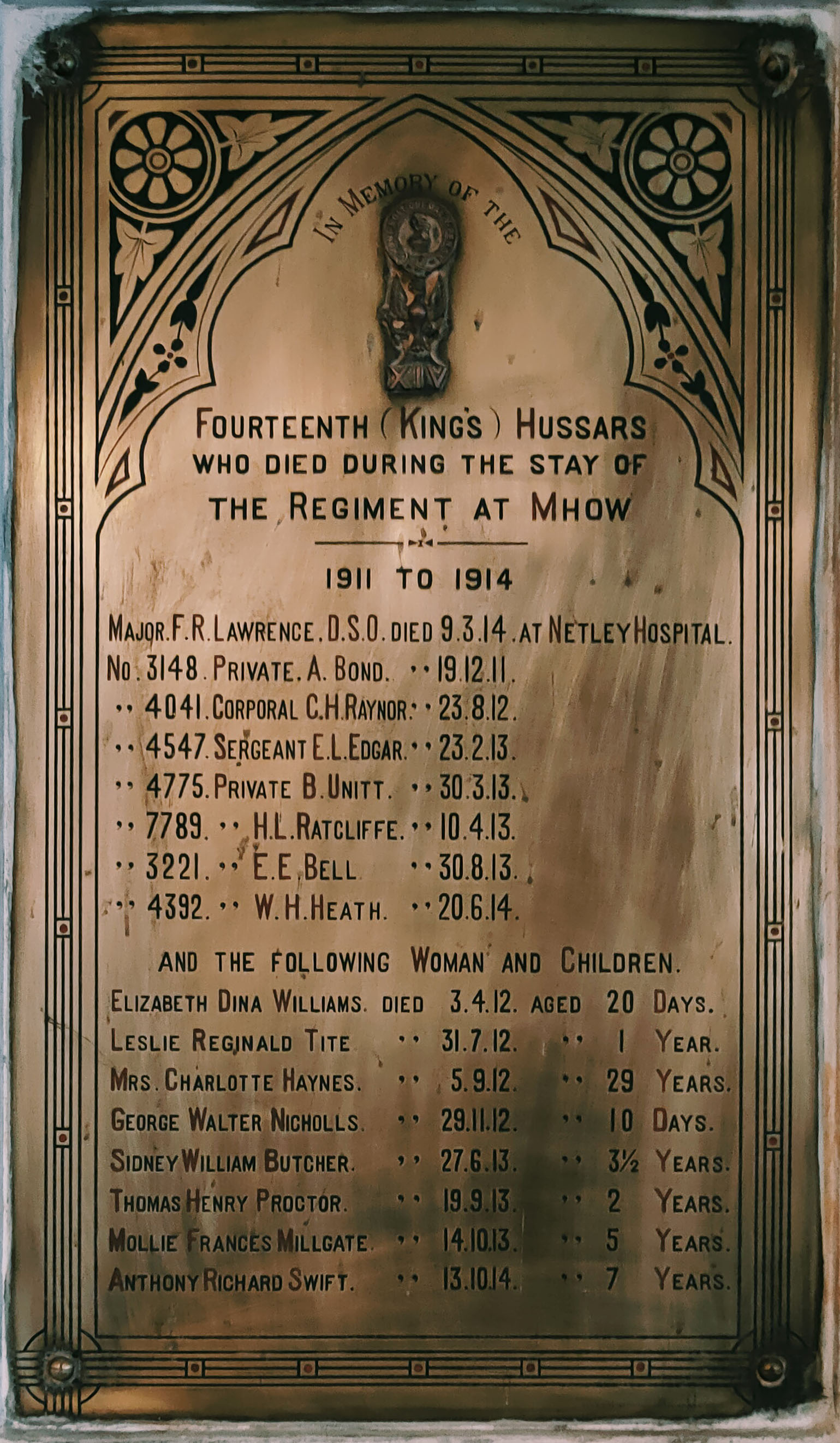
The 14th (Kings) Hussars placed this bronze plaque in memory of their comrades who died between 1911 and 1914

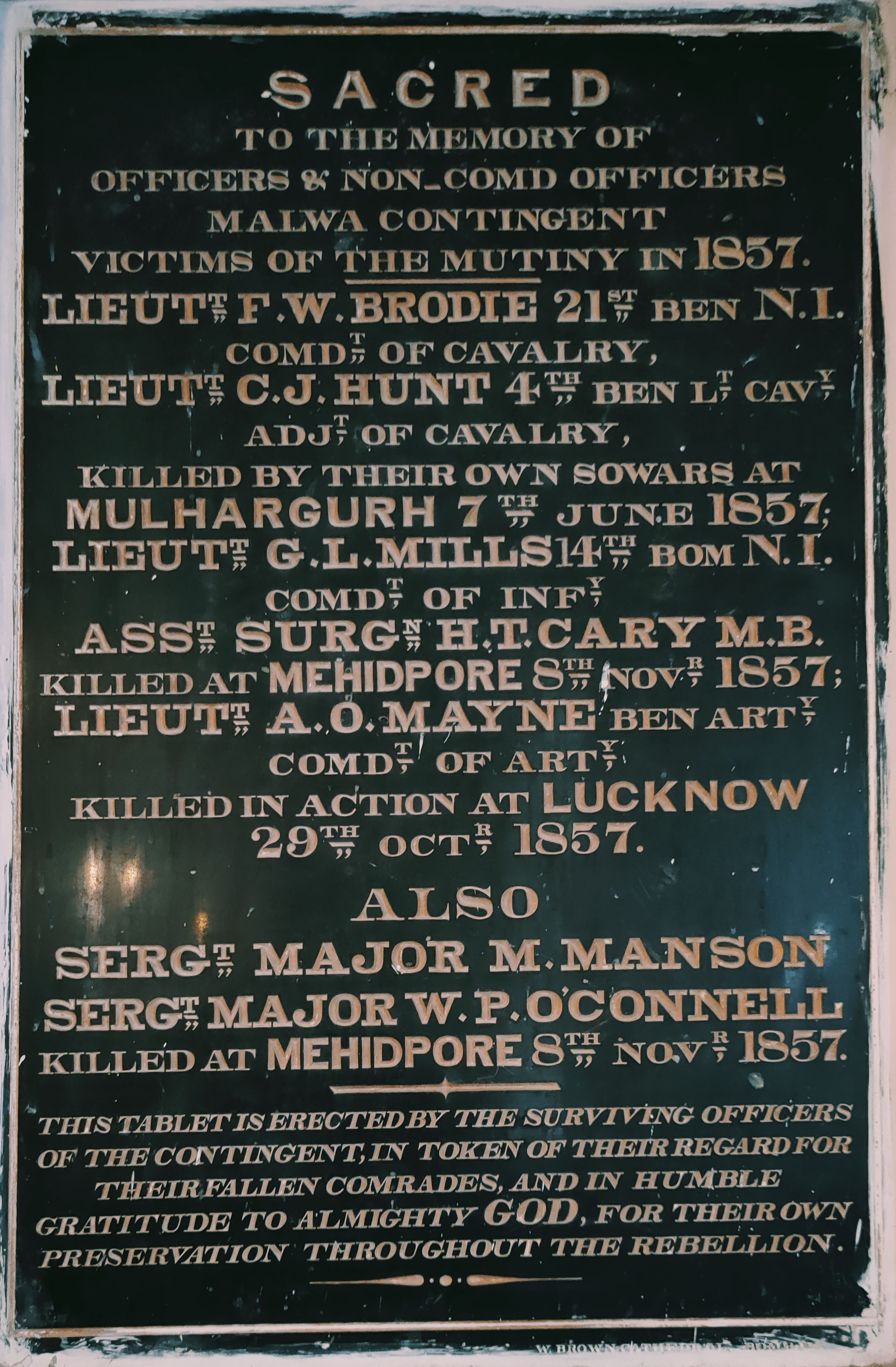
The Malwa Contingent placed this black marble plaque in memory of the officers and men who died during the Indian Rebellion of 1857

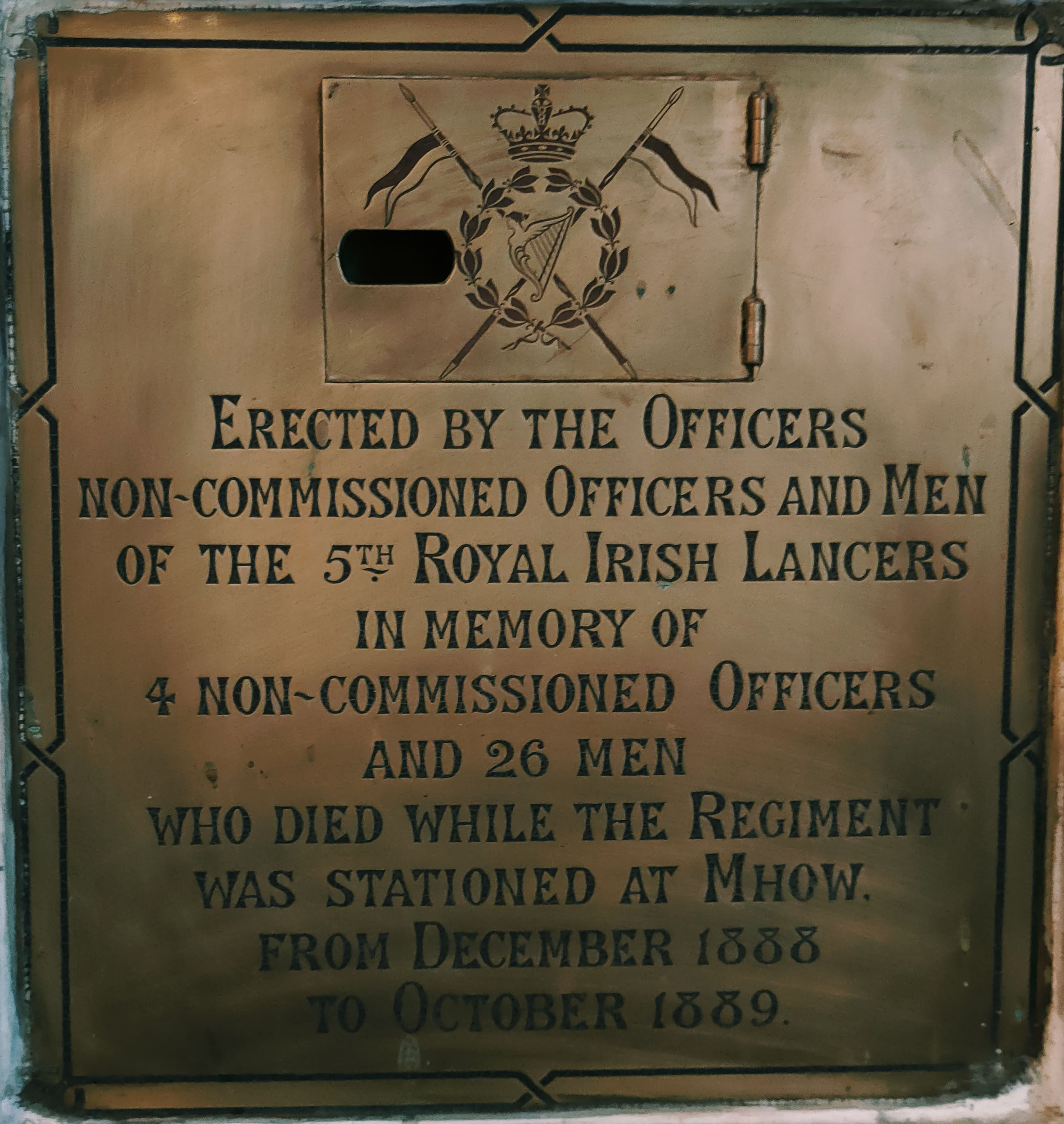
The 5th Royal Irish Lancers were stationed at Mhow between 1888 and 1889 and placed this brass plaque with a small built-in cabinet

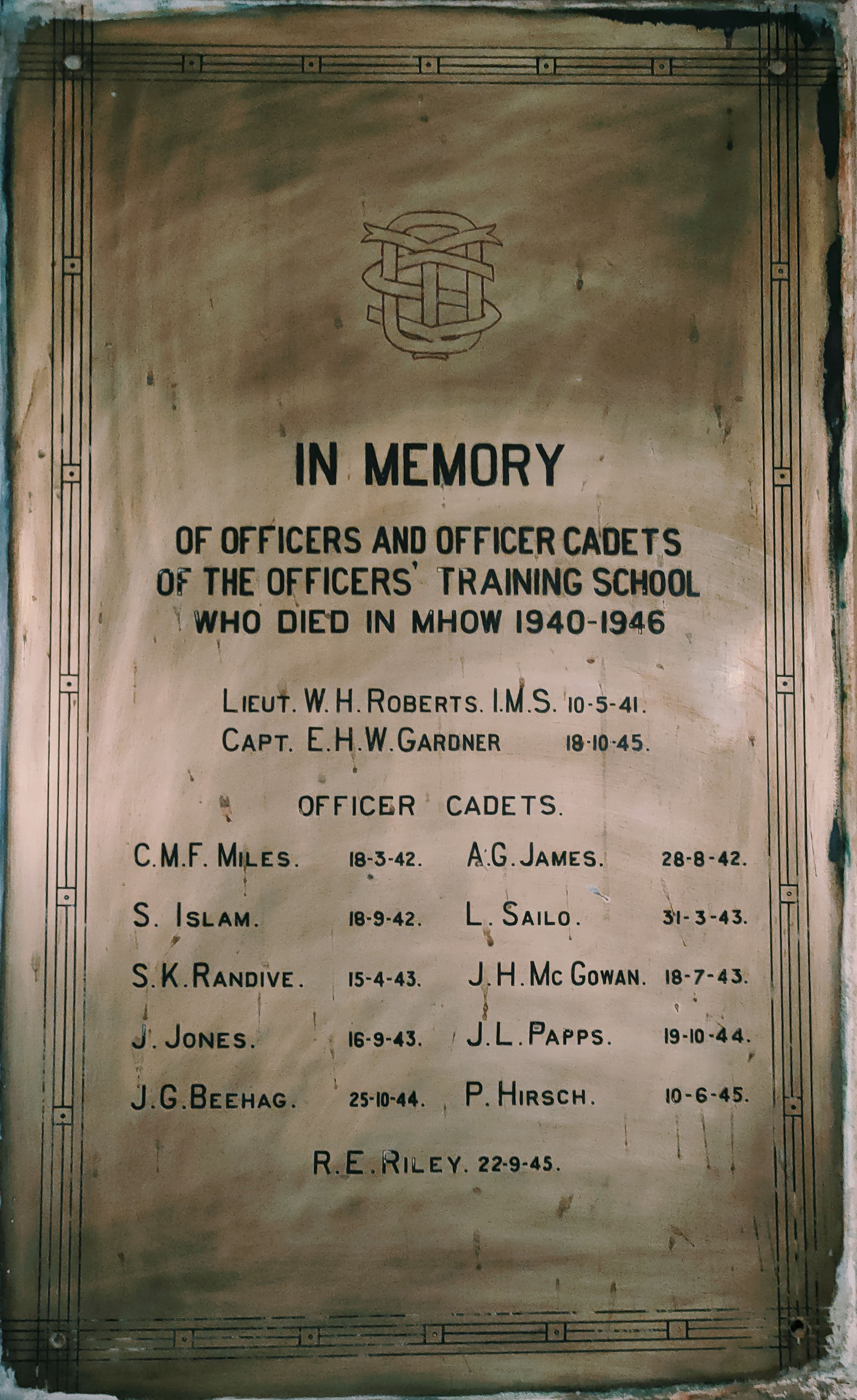
The plaque in memory of the Instructors and Officer Cadets of Officers Training School Mhow who died between 1940 and 1946

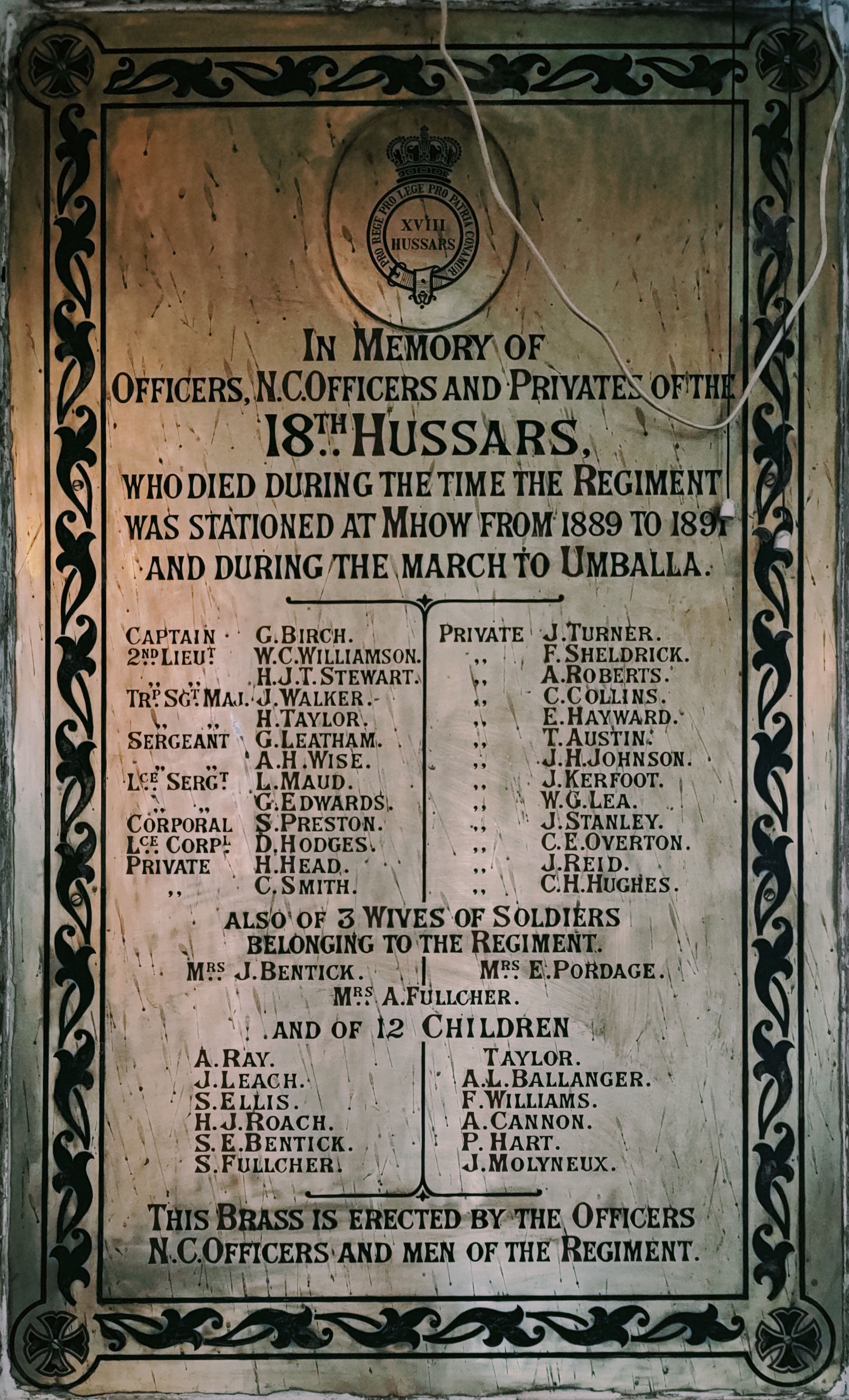
The 18th Hussars commemorated those who died while the Unit was at Mhow from 1889 to 1891 and during their March to Umballa

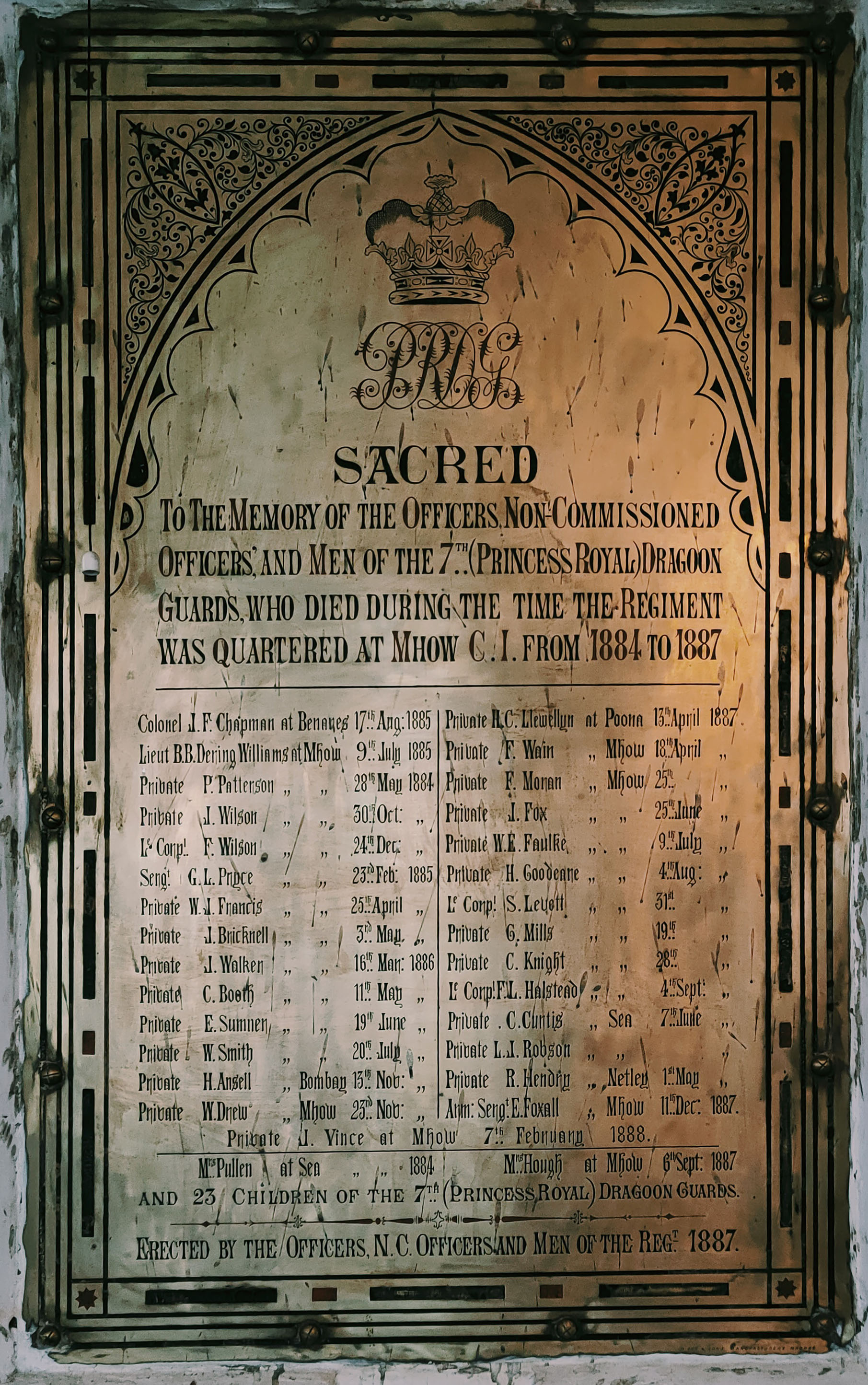
The 7th Princess Royal Dragoon Guards were at Mhow from 1884 to 1887 and placed this brass plaque in memory of their comrades who died during the tenure

== Sources ==
- Indore Plus, Times of India 24 April 2011: "Chronicle of Christ Church" by Deepa Vanjani
- Daily Pioneer 25 Dec 2019: "Christ church catches people’s attention" by Vikas Tyagi
- Photos of Christ Church
