= Gulawat Lotus valley =

Valley in Madhya Pradesh, India

Coordinates: 22°47′14″N 75°41′47″E

Gulawat Lotus valley is a valley near Gulawat village at Hatod tehsil, Indore district, Madhya Pradesh, India. It is the largest lotus valley in Asia, and is covered with thick forest surrounded by small ponds around which are covered with lotus and for which the source of water is the Yashwant Sagar Dam located nearby.

It is located near Indore attracts many tourists during the year. It is regarded as largest lotus valley in Asia.

The valley is accessible by air from Devi Ahilya Bai Holkar Airport, approximately 16 km away, by rail from Indore Junction railway station, or by road from Sarwate Bus Stand.
