= Khadotiya =

- Village
- Nickname: Thikana Khadotiya
- Location of Khadotiya Khadotiya (India)
- Coordinates: 22.9267787°N 75.6756269°E
- Country: India
- State: Madhya Pradesh
- District: Indore
- Tehsil: Depalpur
- Gram Panchayat: Deorakhedi
- Establishment: 1247 AD
- Founder: Panwar Rajputs

Government
  - Type: Local Self Government
  - Body: Gram panchayat
  - Sarpanch: Kailash Prajapat

Area
  - Total: 3.763600 km^{2} (1.453134 sq mi)
- Elevation: 497 m (1,631 ft)

Population (2011)
  - Total: 651
  - Density: 173/km^{2} (448/sq mi)

Language
  - Official: Hindi
- Time zone: UTC+5:30 (IST)
- PIN: 453115
- Vehicle registration: MP09

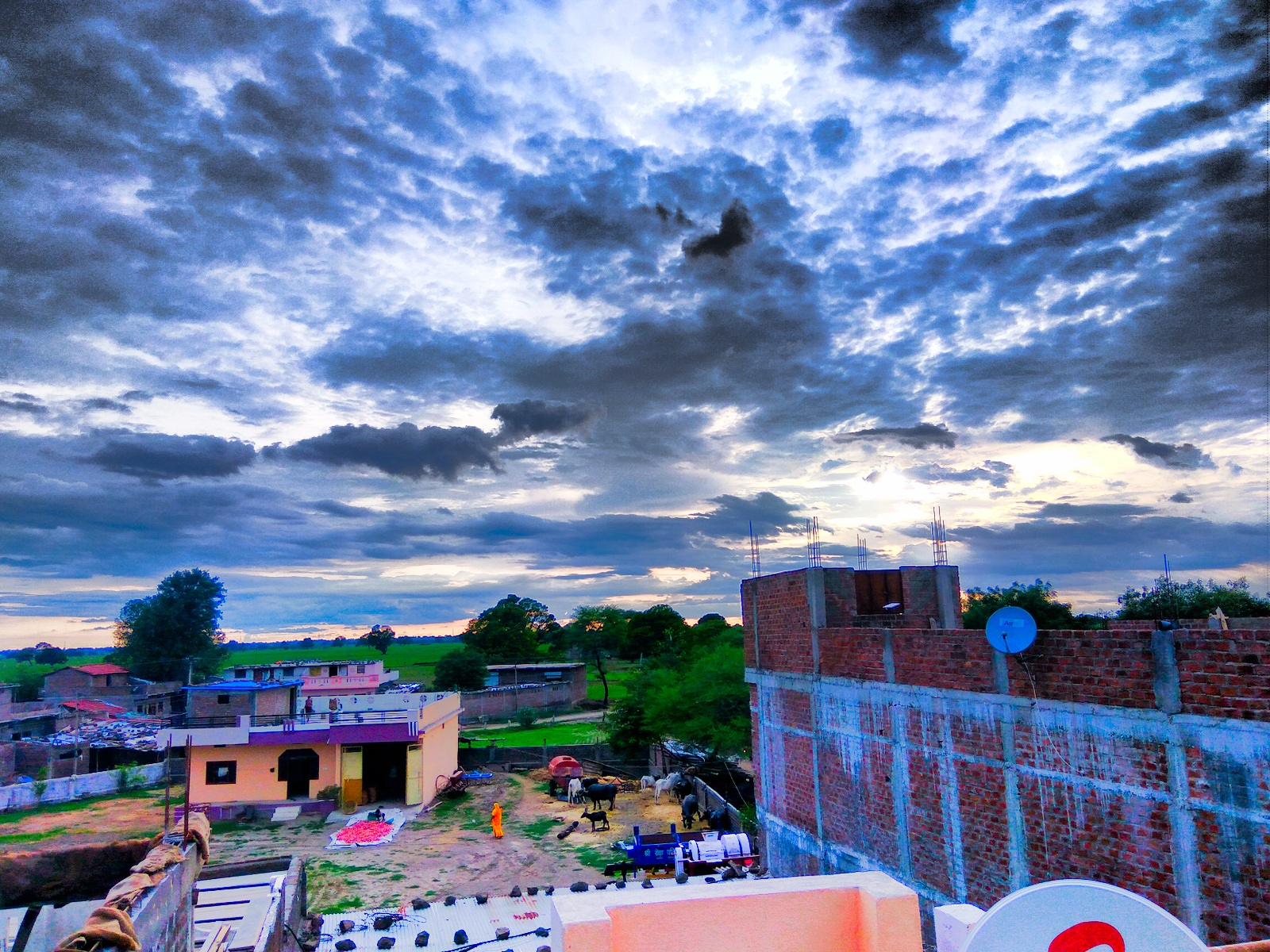
Khadotiya Village

Khadotiya is a village in Depalpur tehsil in Indore district of Madhya Pradesh State, India. The village is located 36 km away from district headquarters Indore, 17 km from Depalpur and 212 km from state capital Bhopal.

== Demographics ==
=== Population ===
Khadotiya village has population of 651 of which 332 are males while 319 are females as per Population Census of 2011.

=== Literacy ===
Khadotiya village has lower literacy rate compared to Madhya Pradesh. In 2011, literacy rate of Khadotiya village was 56.19% compared to 69.32% of Madhya Pradesh. In Khadotiya Male literacy stands at 68.90% while female literacy rate was 42.76%. In Khadotiya village population of children with age 0-6 is 69 which makes up 10.60% of total population of village.

Average Sex Ratio of Khadotiya village is 961 which is higher than Madhya Pradesh state average of 931. Child Sex Ratio for the Khadotiya as per census is 1091, higher than Madhya Pradesh average of 918.

=== Religion ===
Majority of population in Khadotiya village are Hindus.

Religion in Khadotiya
| Religion | Percent |
| Hindus | 94% |
| Muslims | 5.35% |
| Jains | 0.65% |
Distribution of religions

=== Caste Factor ===
Schedule Caste (SC) constitutes 21.35% of total population in Khadotiya village. The village Khadotiya currently doesn’t have any Schedule Tribe (ST) population.

== Work Profile ==
In Khadotiya village out of total population, 218 were engaged in work activities.

The occupation of workers in the village is Main Work (Employment or Earning more than 6 Months) and none of them are engaged in any marginal activity which provides them livelihood for less than 6 months. Of 218 workers engaged in Main Work, 133 were cultivators (owner or co-owner) while 77 were Agricultural labourer.

== Administration ==
As per constitution of India and Panchyati Raaj Act, Khadotiya village is administrated by Sarpanch (Head of Village) who is elected representative of village. Currently Kailash Prajapat is the Sarpanch of Khadotiya since May 2022.

== History ==
Khadotiya has been ruled by several kingdoms and dynasties, including the Paramaras, the Malwa sultans, the Mughals and the Marathas. The village was established in 1247 AD by Panwar Rajputs who came from Palduna, assassinated Rangara, people, and took possession of Khadotiya.

== Culture ==
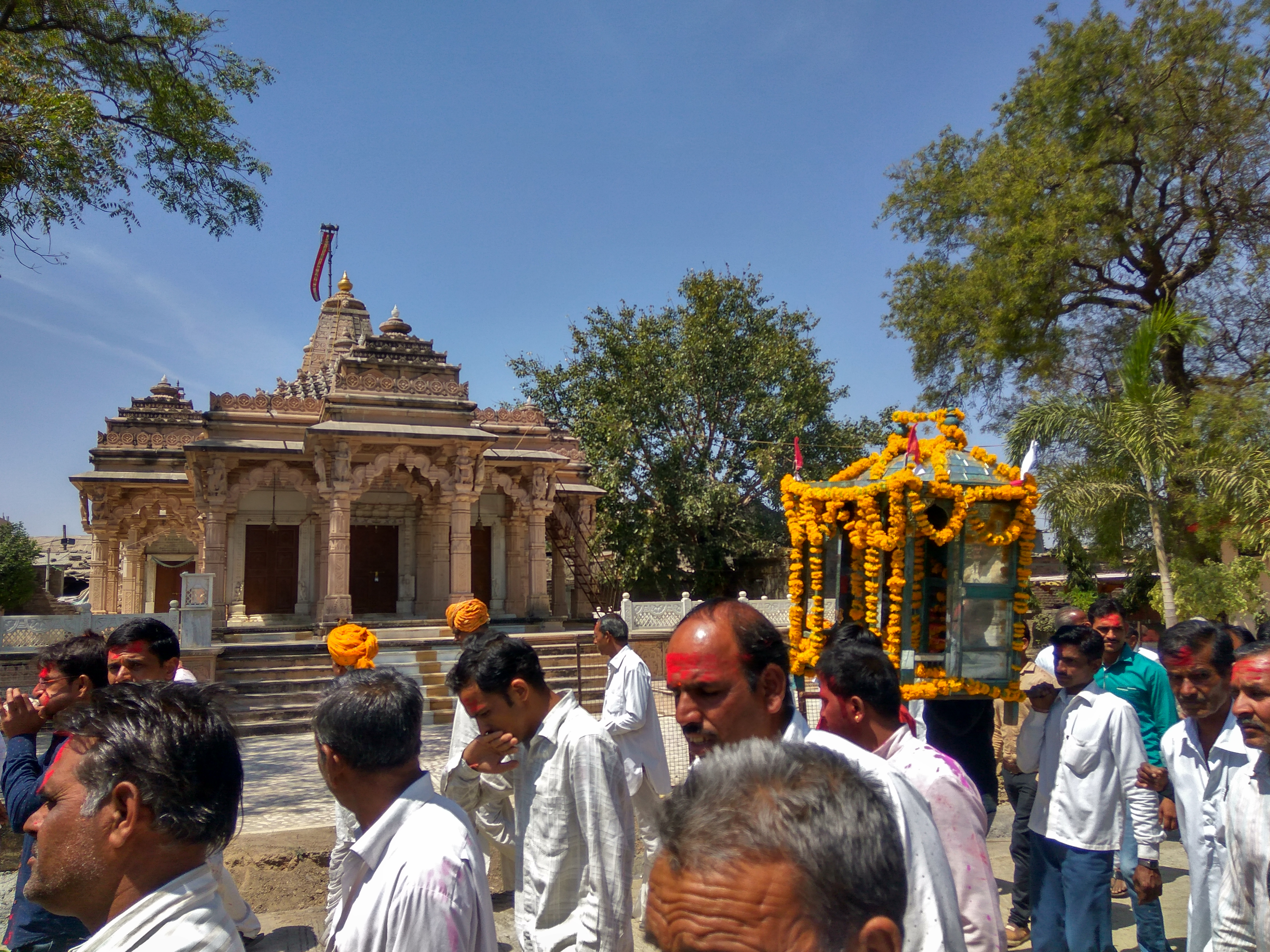
Villagers celebrating Jamra festival.

The culture of Khadotiya has been significantly influenced by Rajasthani and Gujrati culture, because of their geographic proximity.

The main language of Khadotiya is Malvi. This Indo-European language is subclassified as Indo-Aryan. The language is sometimes referred to as Malavi or Ujjaini. Malvi is part of the Rajasthani branch of languages.

Traditional Malwa food has elements of Rajasthani, Gujarati cuisine. Traditionally, jowar was the staple cereal, but after the Green Revolution in India, wheat has replaced jowar as the most important food crop.

== Tourist places ==
=== Shri Keshwarna Adinath Jain Temple ===
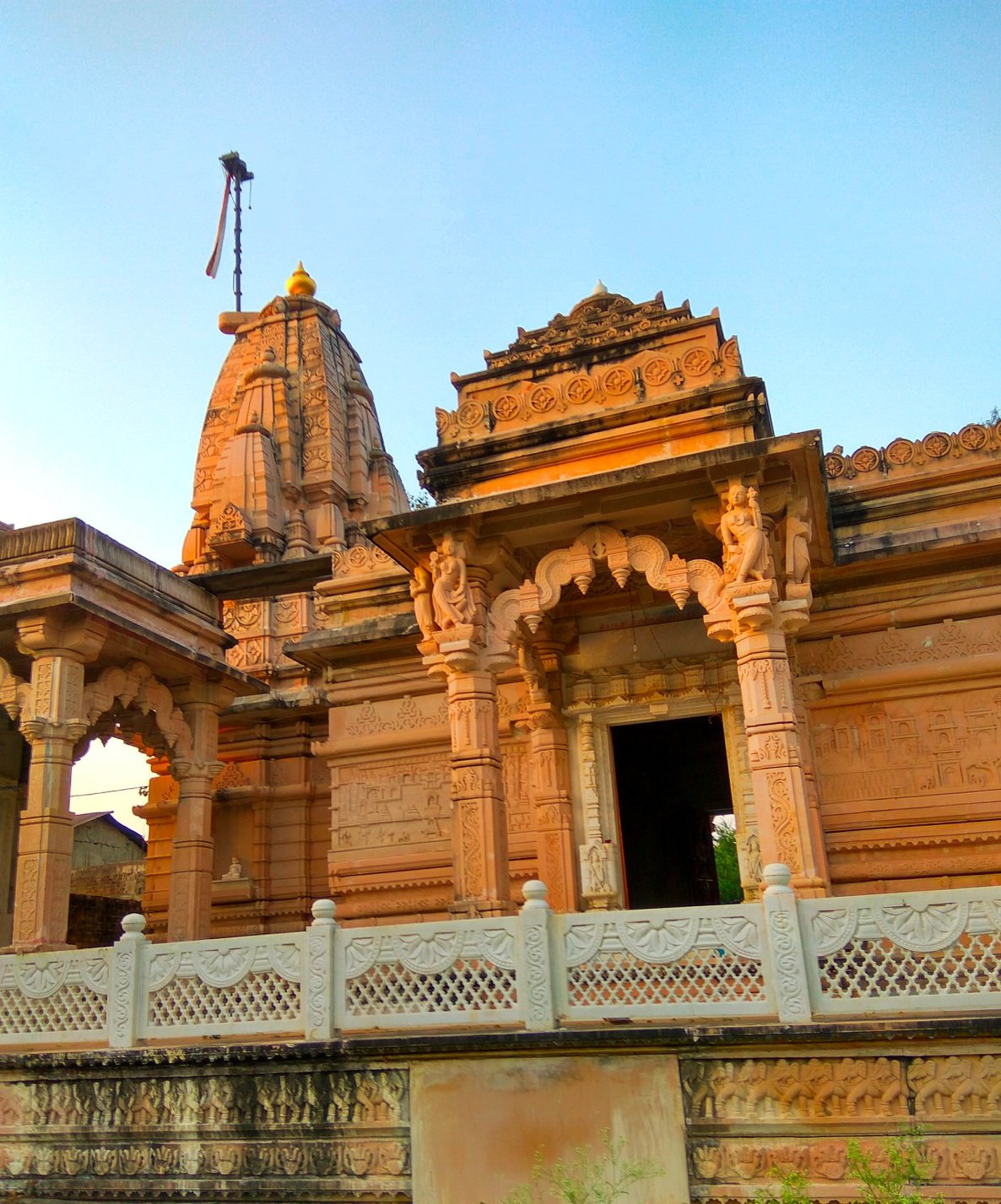
Jain Temple

There is a 540 years statue of Shri Adinath Keshwarna in Jain Temple. The temple was reconstructed by Rishabh Dharmchakra Vihar Trust and was completed in 2010.

=== Ramsa Peera Temple ===
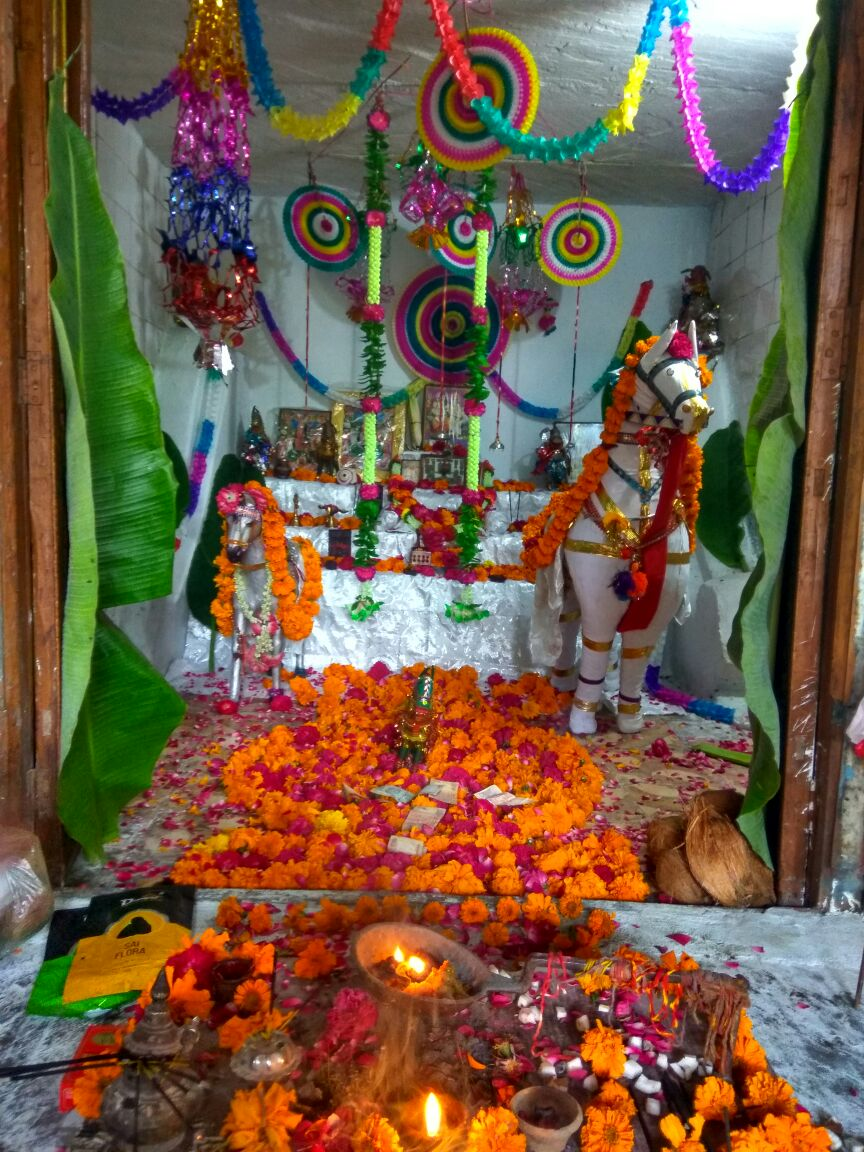
Inside Ramsa Peer Temple

== Annual Fair ==
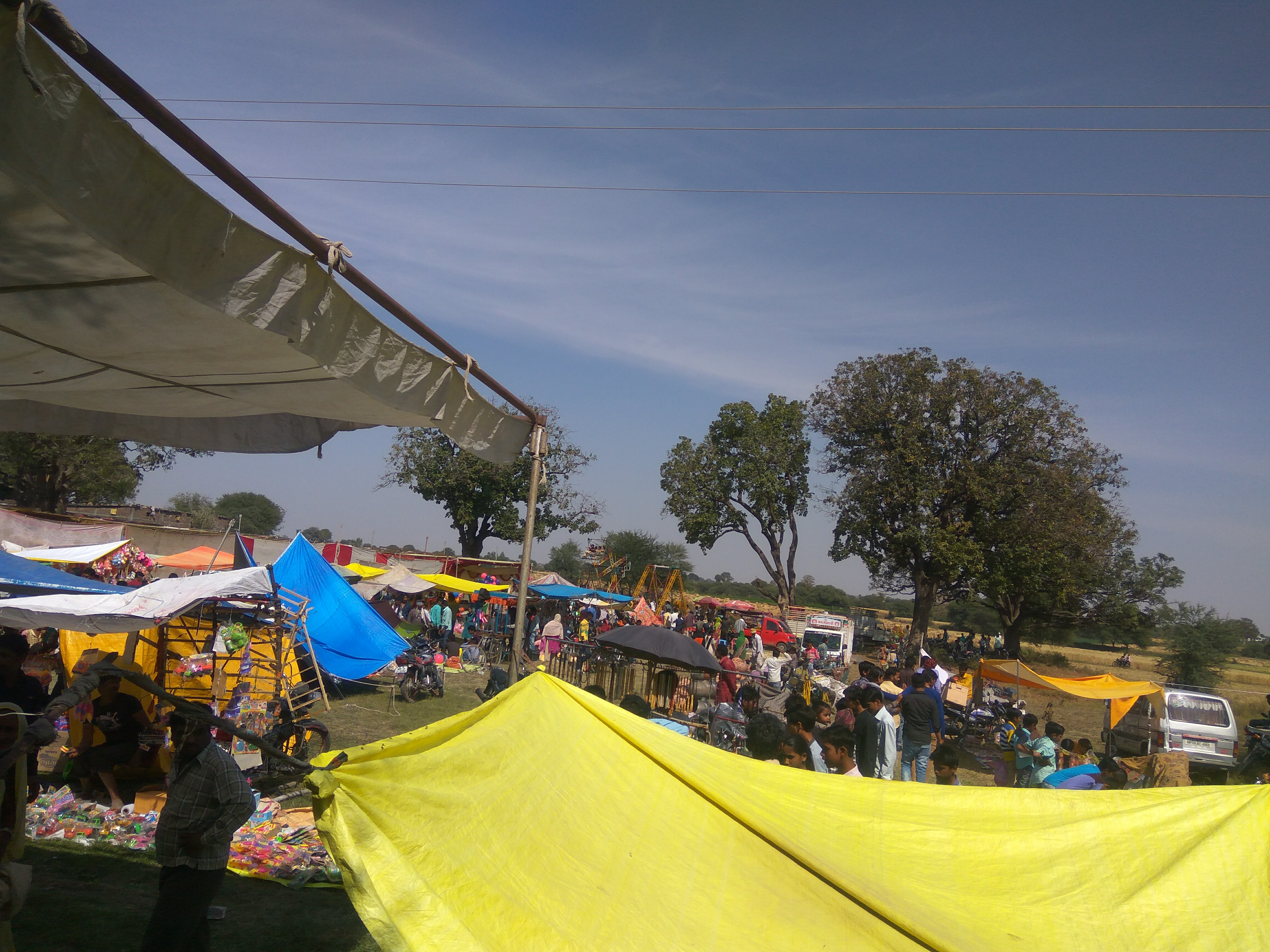
Annual Fair at Khadotiya Village

Khadotiya is also famous for its annual fair (Jatra) which is held for next two days after Holi. During the Jatra, the idol of Lord Krishna are taken out on special procession (Imliwadi) in a "Palkhi" (sort of a Palanquin).
