= Yashwant Sagar =

Dam reservoir in Madhya Pradesh, India

- Location of Yashwant Sagar Yashwant Sagar (India)
- Location: Madhya Pradesh, India
- Coordinates: 22°48′33.6″N 75°41′39.8″E
- River sources: Gambhir river
- Built: 1939

Ramsar Wetland
- Official name: Yashwant Sagar
- Designated: 7 January 2022
- Reference no.: 2495

Yashwant Sagar is a dam reservoir on Gambhir river, located around 26 kilometers west of Indore near Hatod village on Indore-Depalpur road in Indore district of Madhya Pradesh. It supplies water to Indore. It is spread over around 2,650 hectares. It was built in 1939.

It is one of the strongholds of the vulnerable Sarus crane in central India. It is also one of the 19 Important Bird Areas of Madhya Pradesh. Also it is one of the two IBAs in Indore region as well as one of the most important birding sites in Malwa. The reservoir has been designated as a protected Ramsar site since 2022.

== See also ==
- Sirpur Lake
- Important Bird Area
- Sarus Crane
