= Rajeev John George =

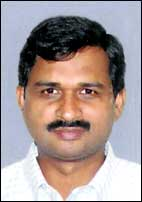
- Born: 3 July 1970; Jodhpur, Rajasthan
- Died: 21 February 2005 (aged 34)
- Occupation: Housing rights activist
- Awards: Ashoka Fellow, COHRE 2004 Housing Rights Defender Award

Rajeev John George (3 July 1970 – 21 February 2005) was a housing rights activist born in Jodhpur, Rajasthan. Rajeev was nurtured in a Christian conservative family. He lived in a cantonment town named Mhow, Indore District, Madhya Pradesh, India. He studied in Rajeshwar Vidhyalaya, Govt. Higher Secondary School, Devi Ahilya University, Indore. While studying for (MSW) Master of Social Work he lived in a slum in Indore called Chandra Prabha Shekhar Nagar. Rajeev was the founding member of an organization called Deenbandhu and was the Convenor for (NFHR) National Forum for Housing Rights. He was named an Ashoka Fellow in 2004.

One of Rajeev's most significant contributions towards the realisation of housing rights in India ... [was] his highly innovative strategies in developing pro-poor interventions in the City Master Plans of Indore and Hyderabad."

Rajeev John George was awarded the Geneva based "COHRE 2004 Housing Rights Defender Award".

Rajeev died on 21 February 2005.
