= Tincha Waterfall =

Waterfall in Indore district, MP

Coordinates: 22.5758°N 75.9771°E

Tincha Falls
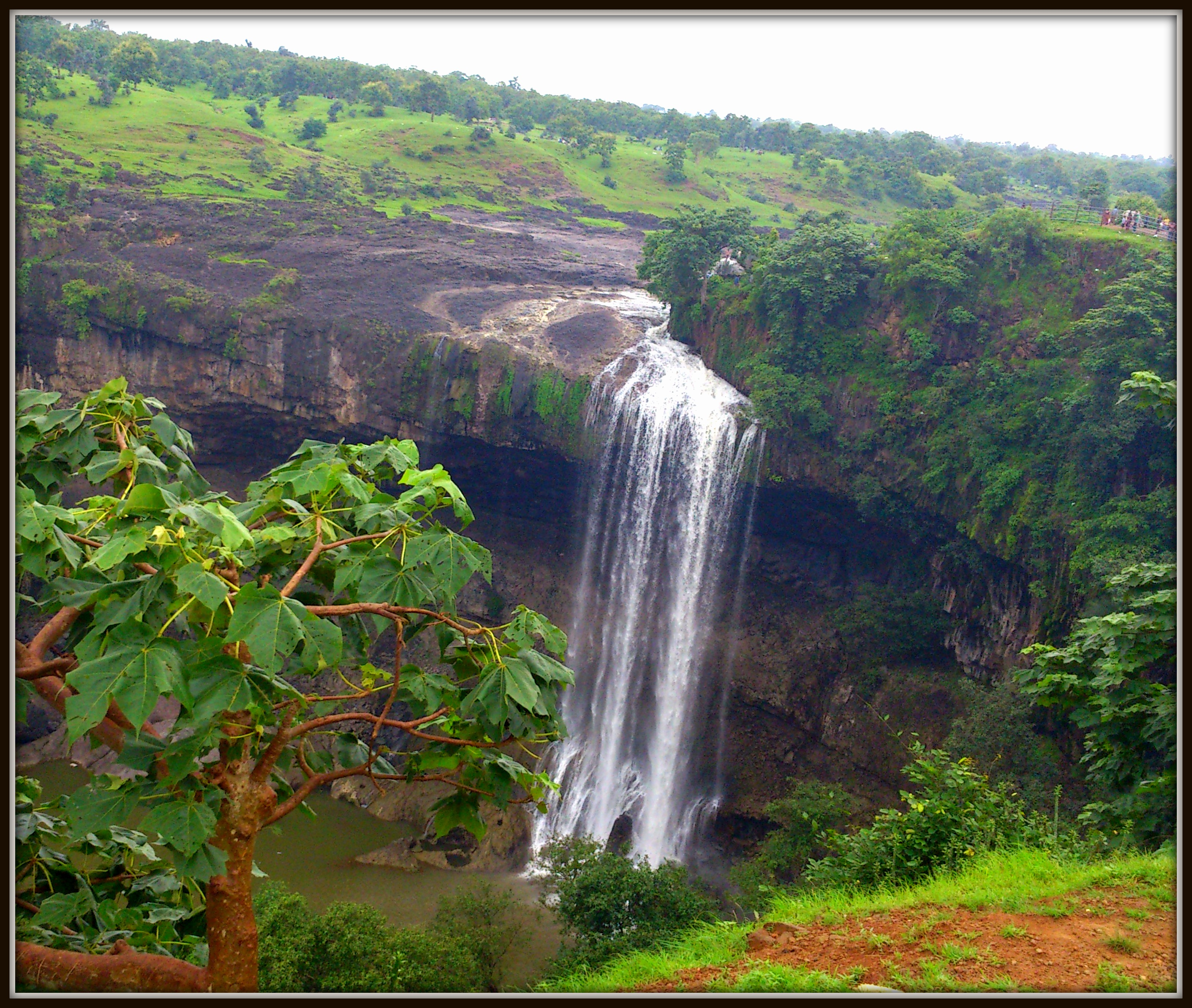
- Location: Tillore, Indore, Madhya Pradesh
- Type: segmented
- Number of drops: 1
- Watercourse: Kanar river

The Tincha Waterfall is located in Tillore within the Indore district in the state of Madhya Pradesh, India.

== The falls ==
The water flow is highest immediately after the rainy season (usually after July). It goes almost dry in the summer season, and the stream is reduced to a trickle. The area around Tincha is a popular picnic and trekking spot.

== Location ==
The nearest airport is Indore International Airport which is situated at a distance of roughly 40 km from the falls. Tillore is the nearest town.

=== Rail ===
The nearest railway station is Indore Junction railway station, 30 km from the waterfall.

=== Road ===
The route to the waterfall by road goes through the town of Tillore in Indore District, 9 km away on internal country roads.

== Accidents ==
Accidents have occurred at the waterfall in the past. In 2017 a pair of students who were out for a picnic drowned. A youth fell into the gorge in 2018.

== See also ==
- List of waterfalls
- List of waterfalls in India
