= Depalpur =

Depalpur may refer to:

- Depalpur, India, a town in Madhya Pradesh, India
  - Depalpur (Vidhan Sabha constituency)
- Depalpur Tehsil, Punjab, Pakistan, whose chief town is Dipalpur
- Dipalpur (also written as Depalpur), a town in Punjab, Pakistan
