= Mothala, Madhya Pradesh =

Mothala
- Village
- Location in Madhya Pradesh, India
- Coordinates: 22°40′57″N 075°35′15″E
- Country: India
- State: Madhya Pradesh
- District: Indore
- Tehsil: Depalpur

Population (2001)
  - Total: 519
- Time zone: UTC+5:30 (IST)
- ISO 3166 code: IN-MP
- Vehicle registration: MP-
- Lok Sabha constituency: Indore
- Vidhan Sabha constituency: Depalpur

Mothala is a village in western Madhya Pradesh, India. Administratively it is under Jhalariya Gram Panchayat, Depalpur, Indore District, Madhya Pradesh. Mothala is 1.5 km by road west of the town of Betma, and 23 km by road south of the town of Depalpur.

== Demographics ==
In the 2001 census, the village of Mothala had 519 inhabitants, with 267 males (51.4%) and 252 females (48.6%), for a gender ratio of 944 females per thousand males.
