= College of Veterinary Science and Animal Husbandry =

College of Veterinary Science and Animal Husbandry may refer to these veterinary medicine colleges in India:

- College of Veterinary Science and Animal Husbandry, Anand, Gujarat
- College of Veterinary Science and Animal Husbandry (Bhubaneshwar), Odisha
- College of Veterinary Science and Animal Husbandry, Jalukie, Nagaland
- College Of Veterinary Science And Animal Husbandry (Mathura), Uttar Pradesh
- College of Veterinary Sciences and Animal Husbandry, Mhow, Madhya Pradesh
- School of Veterinary Sciences & Animal Husbandry, Pasighat, Arunachal Pradesh
- College of Veterinary Sciences and Animal Husbandry, Selesih, Central Agricultural University, Manipur

== See also ==
- College of Veterinary and Animal Sciences, Mannuthy, Thrissur, Kerala, India
- College of Veterinary and Animal Science, Bikaner, Rajasthan University of Veterinary and Animal Sciences, Bikaner, Rajasthan, India
- Kerala Veterinary and Animal Sciences University, Kerala, India
- College of Veterinary and Animal Sciences, Pantnagar, G. B. Pant University of Agriculture and Technology, Pantnagar, Uttarakhand, India
