= Sirpur Lake =

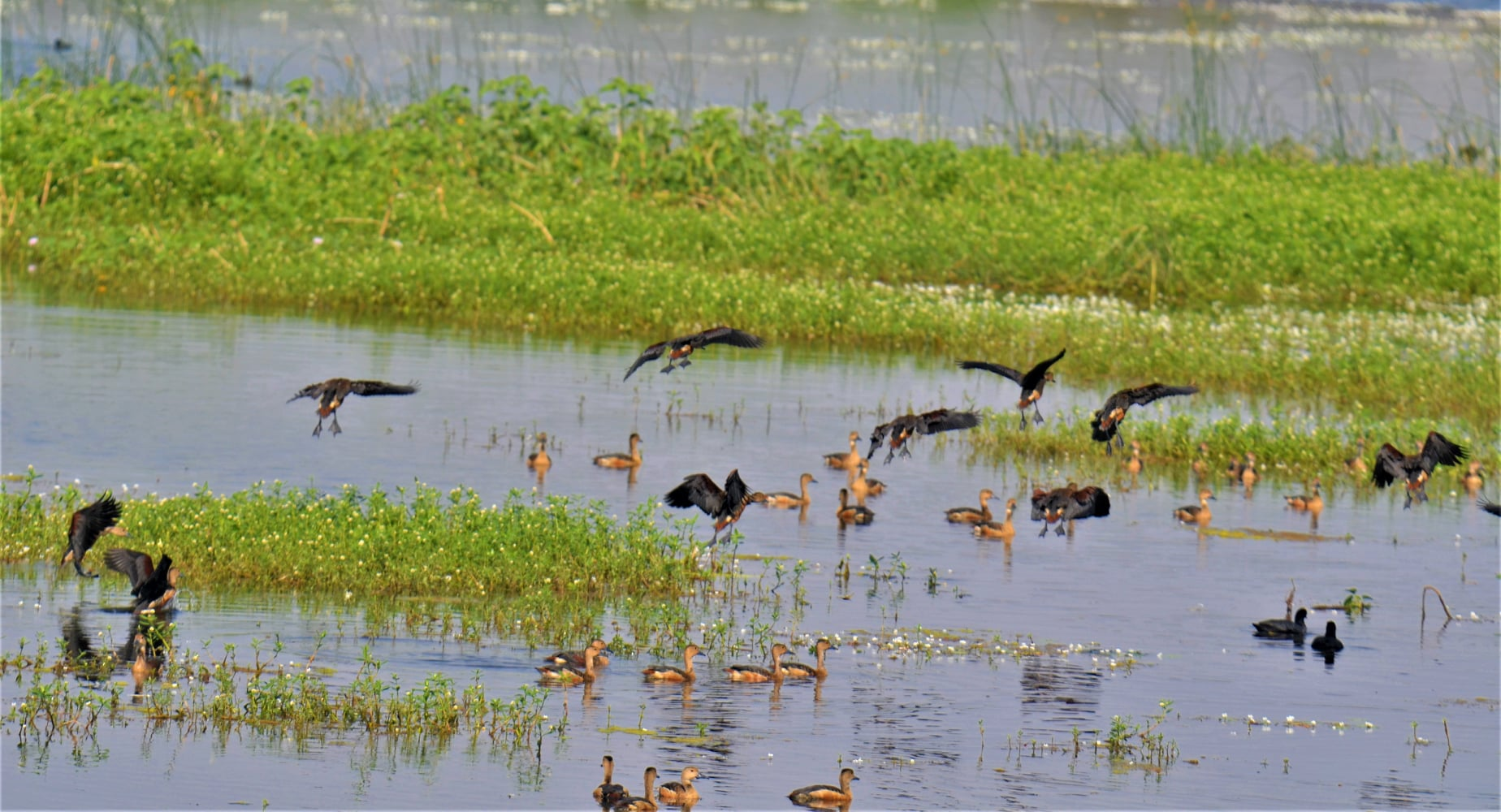
- Ducks and coots at Sirpur Wetland
- Interactive map of Sirpur Lake
- Location: Indore district, Madhya Pradesh
- Coordinates: 22°42′02″N 78°48′46″E
- Lake type: Freshwater Lake, wetland
- Primary inflows: Various local streams
- Primary outflows: Sirpur stream, which joins the Saraswati river near Gouri Nagar, Indore

Ramsar Wetland
- Designated: 1 July 2022
- Reference no.: 2478

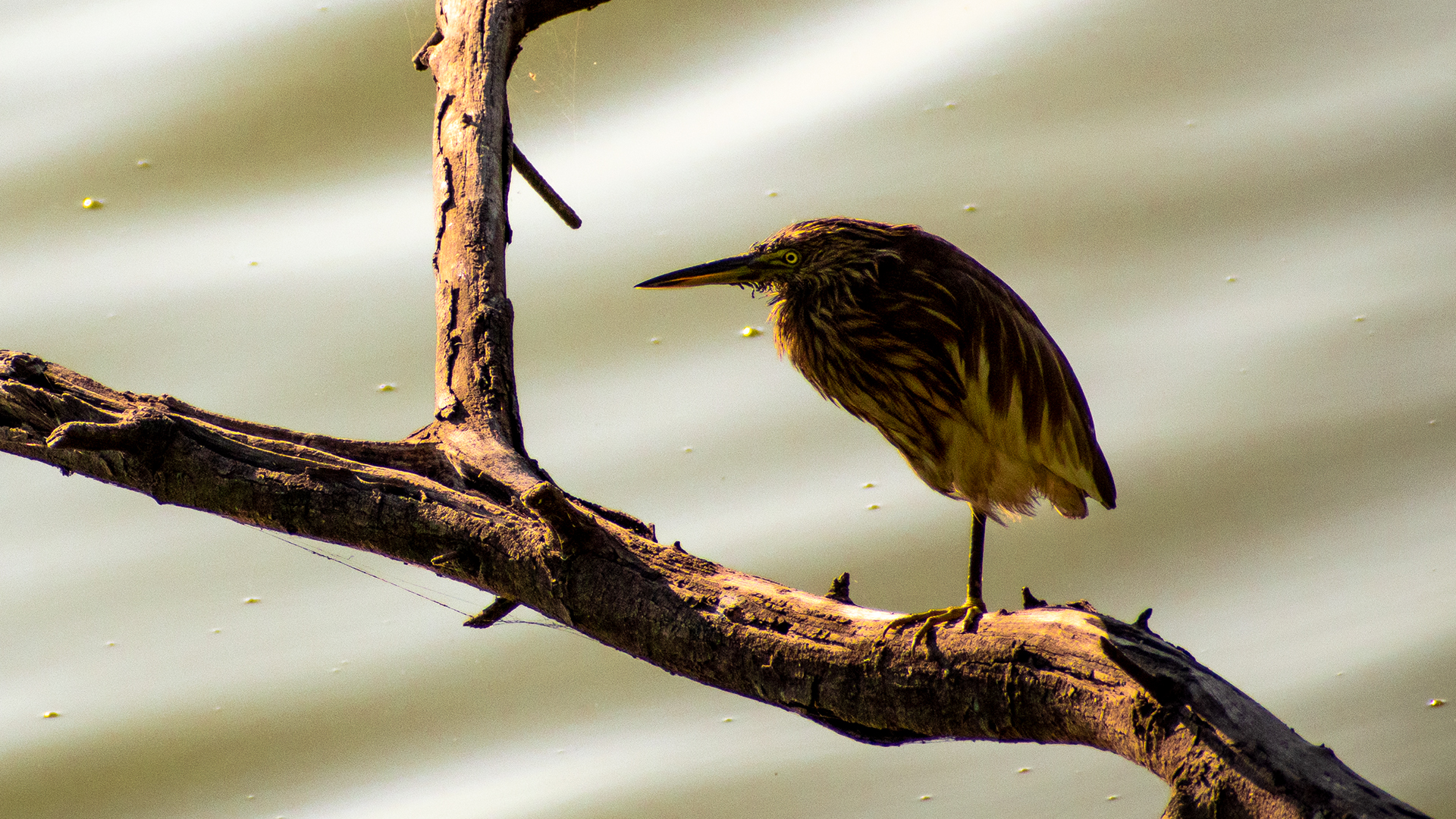

Sirpur Lake is located on Indore-Dhar Road in Indore. The total area of the lake and its surrounding protected region is 800 acres (around 3.6 square kilometers) and falls under the jurisdiction of the Indore Municipal Corporation. The wetland has been designated as a Ramsar site under the Ramsar Convention on 07-01-2022.

== History ==
Sirpur Lake was created by the Holkars of Indore State in the early 20th century. After the independence of India and extinction of the royal houses, religious sites started mushrooming up around the lake and over the years it was encroached upon by the people living in its vicinity. In February 2024, the Indore Municipal Corporation took action to remove encroachments from the lake as part of conservation efforts. Illegal activities like fishing, poaching, cattle grazing, waste dumping, etc., almost destroyed the lake's ecology.

== Restoration ==
The potential of the lake as a significant bird habitat was recognized by the Holkars of Indore. In early 1980s, Bhalu Mondhe, a renowned photographer and artist of Indore, now a Padmashri awardee, started restoring the lake, first individually and later joined by his friends, most notably, Abhilash Khandekar. Mondhe and Khandekar co-founded an NGO in 1992, The Nature Volunteers, primarily to restore the lake's ecology and develop it as an ideal birding site.

As the lake was restored, it became the home to many avian species and started attracting migratory birds, including ruddy shelduck, which migrates from Mongolia and Siberia for wintering at Sirpur. A total of around 130 species are listed in the book, The Birds of Sirpur.

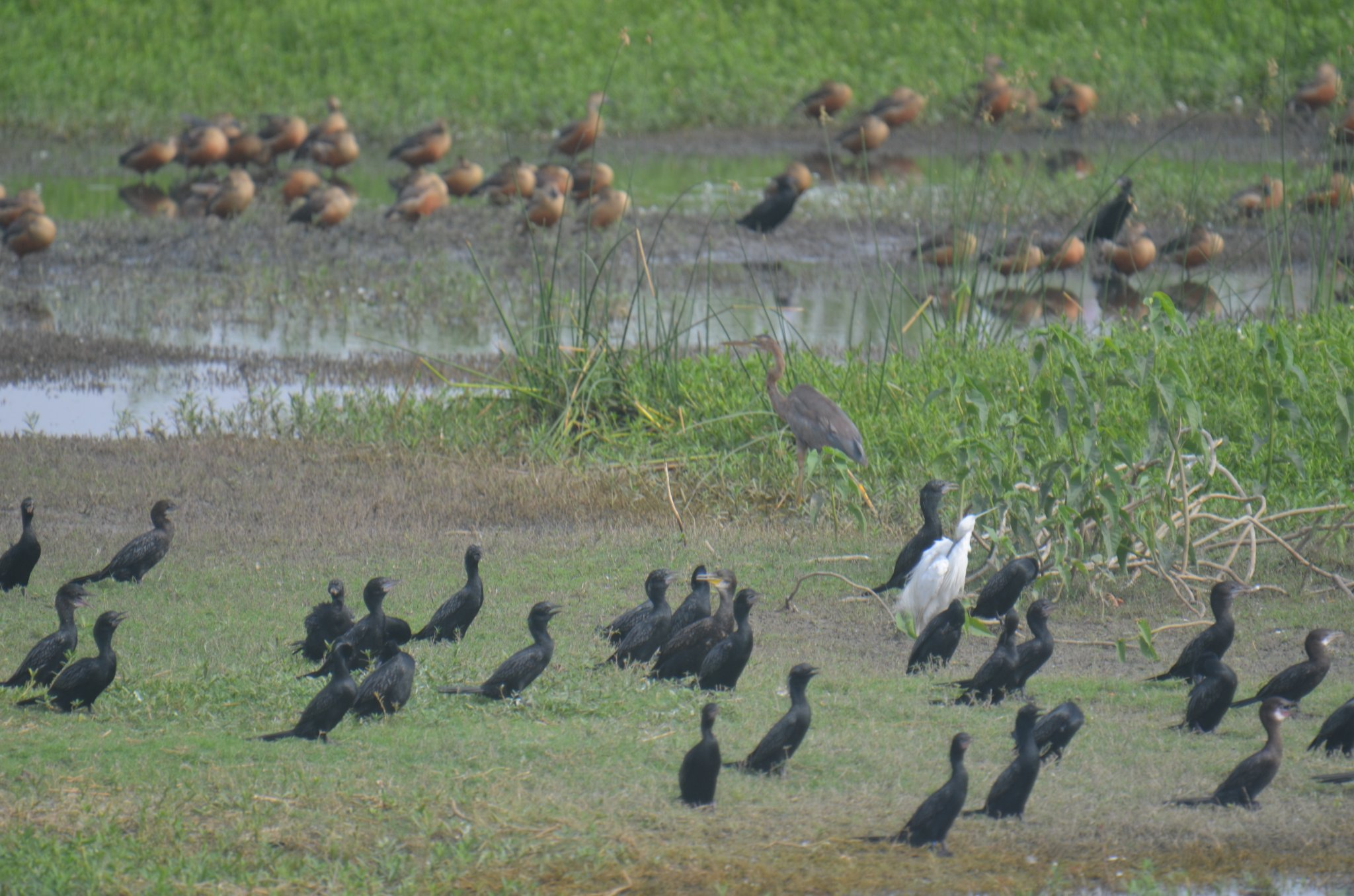

== IBA status ==
The lake was recognized by BirdLife International as one of the 19 important bird areas (IBAs) of Madhya Pradesh in 2015.

Another IBA near Indore is Yashwant Sagar, which was also declared a Ramsar site in August, 2022.

== Nature Knowledge Centre (Interpretation Centre) ==
An interpretation center is being established with an outlay of Rs.2.5 crores for educating the people and the visitors about the ecology of Sirpur lake, nearby wetlands, Malwa, Madhya Pradesh and Central India.

== Ramsar Recognition ==
In July, 2022, the Sirpur wetland was declared a Ramsar site.

Indore received accreditation under the Ramsar Convention's Wetland City Accreditation Scheme alongside Udaipur, making it one of India's first two Ramsar Wetland Cities.

== See also ==
- Bhalchandra Dattatray Mondhe
- List of Ramsar sites in India
- Important Bird Area
- Yashwant Sagar
