= Bhalchandra Dattatray Mondhe =

Indian artist

Bhalchandra Mondhe
- Born: 15 March 1944 (age 82)
- Occupations: Painter; Sculptor; Writer; Photographer; Environmentalist
- Known for: Padma Shri
- Notable work: Birds of Sirpur

Bhalchandra Dattatray Mondhe (born 15 March 1944) is an Indian artist, photographer, sculptor and painter from Madhya Pradesh. In 2016, the President of India bestowed upon him the Padma Shri award for his lifetime work in photography. He has authored two books, including Birds of Sirpur, which he co-authored. Mondhe co-founded an NGO to save the Sirpur Lake, The Nature Volunteers, which is credited with reviving the Sirpur Lake.

== Early life and career ==
Mondhe first encountered photography when he was 17. He subsequently became passionate about photography during his youth. In a 2016 feature on him by the Hindustan Times, Mondhe said that he used the camera to encapsulate his vision, adding, "I have never considered the camera and the lens as a burden to carry, but as my extension". Mondhe went on to graduate from the Düsseldorf Academy of Fine Arts in Germany.

Mondhe also developed an interest in sculpting, with the Nehru Centre hosting his exhibition in October 1993. The magazine India Today described his work as "unconventional", mentioning: "Indore-based Bhalu Mondhe uses anything that is handy – any material and any colour, sometimes brush and sometimes fingers – for what he calls 'playing with the material like a child'. The outcome is an unrestricted interplay of different kinds of material".

== Artwork ==
Mondhe's exhibition titled 50 Years of Rare Art Journey was also featured at Rangdarshini Gallery, Bharat Bhavan, in Bhopal. The exhibition featured a montage showcasing 50 years of Mondhe's art creations, including 90 pieces of sculptures, images, drawings and paintings. The Pioneer, covering Mondhe's exhibition, described his work as having a "high vision of creativity", mentioning that Mondhe "is an artist with a difference. He paints, clicks realistic photographs, molds the sculptures of his imagination and draws his ideologies on a plain paper. The way he expresses his imagination to the spectators is commendable".

In January, 2023, Mondhe's artwork was displayed

== Reviving the Sirpur Lake ==
During the 1990s, Mondhe used to regularly visit the Sirpur lake during the mornings to take photographs. On one such occasion, he had a significant argument with a group of slum dwellers who were chopping down a tree. Soon after, in his effort to protect the lake and neighboring region, Mondhe co-founded The Nature Volunteers Club with ornithologist Kaustubh Rishi and journalist Abhilash Khandekar. This group of three worked towards restoring the lake's condition by patrolling the lake regularly, increasing awareness within the society about the lake, investing considerable amounts of their money, communicating with and convincing bureaucrats and politicians, apart from involving institutions like the Bombay Natural History Society and noted individuals like Sunita Narain (Centre for Science and Environment). Subsequently, due to the efforts of Mondhe and his colleagues, the Madhya Pradesh government got involved and improved the infrastructure supporting the lake, apart from fencing off the lake and surrounding region. All this resulted in the Sirpur lake finally becoming a protected water body that could securely host resident and migratory birds.

Business Standard, in an article covering the environmental work of Mondhe and his colleagues, recognized their "remarkably successful effort" in saving and reviving the lake, additionally noting that "in two decades of effort, they have been able to win the support of the larger citizenry and also officialdom, without which such a battle could not have been won".

Mondhe and his colleagues decided to document their efforts to save the lake in the book titled Birds of Sirpur, which Mondhe co-authored. Sunita Narain launched the book in October 2012. The book covers details of migratory and resident birds based around the lake, and documents 130 bird species with photographs. In all, Mondhe has authored two books covering birds.

In August 2022, the Sirpur Lake was officially declared as a Ramsar Site, one of the 54 sites in India.

== Padma Shri ==
Bhalu Mondhe received Padma Shri in January 2016, one of India's highest civilian honours. The award was given for his significant work over the years in the field of photography. The President of India, Pranab Mukherjee, presented the award to him on 28 March 2016, at a ceremony held at Rashtrapati Bhavan, the presidential house.
