= Nanaji Deshmukh Veterinary Science University =

State university in Madhya Pradesh, India

- Motto: Jeevo Rakshati Rakshita
- Type: Public
- Established: 2009; 17 years ago
- Affiliations: UGC, ICAR
- Chancellor: Governor of Madhya Pradesh
- Vice-Chancellor: Dr. Mandeep Sharma
- Location: Jabalpur, Madhya Pradesh, India; 23.199°N 79.944°E
- Website: www.ndvsu.org

Nanaji Deshmukh Veterinary Science University, formerly Madhya Pradesh Pashu-Chikitsa Vigyan Vishwavidyalaya is a State Veterinary Science university located at Jabalpur, Madhya Pradesh, India.

== History ==
It was established in 2009 by the Madhya Pradesh Pashu Chikitsa Vigyan Vishwavidyalaya Adhiniyam, 2009 of the Government of Madhya Pradesh. It imparts education in different branches of veterinary science and fisheries management. The university has three constituent veterinary colleges in Jabalpur, Mhow and Rewa. Other institutes it includes are Fishery College, School of Wildlife Forensic and Health and Animal Biotechnology Centre all in Jabalpur. It also has five polytechnic colleges awarding two year diploma in Animal Husbandry.
