= Tillore =

Tillore Tillorian
- village
- Location in Madhya Pradesh, India
- Coordinates: 22.617°N 75.948°E
- Country: India
- State: Madhya Pradesh
- District: Indore

Population
  - Total: 15,000

Languages
  - Official: Hindi
- Time zone: UTC+5:30 (IST)
- Postal code: 452020
- Vehicle registration: MP-09
- Coastline: 0 kilometres (0 mi)

Tillore Khurd is a village located in the Indore district of Madhya Pradesh, India. It is also a gram panchayat according to 2009 stats and situated 15 km away from Indore, which is both a district and sub-district headquarter of Tillor Khurd village.

== History ==
The history of Tillore dates back to at least the 16th-century. Then, it was described as a village in Kampel Pargana of the Mughal Empire..Tillore is surrounded by Mundla Dosdar, Joshi Guradiya, Shivnagar, Umariya Khurd, Asrawad Khurd in different directions.

== Economy ==
The village is a center of agriculture and trade in the Indore district. Tillore Khurd is a center for milk production and dairy farms.

In June 2023, Childline identified Tillore Khurd as one of the child labour hotspots were children are forced to work for very low wages under unhygienic conditions.
