= Bicholi Hapsi =

Coordinates: 22°43′N 75°56′E

- Census Town
- Interactive map of Bicholi Hapsi
- Country: India
- State: Madhya Pradesh
- District: Indore
- Time zone: UTC+5:30 (IST)

Bicholi Hapsi is a Census Town situated in Indore district of Madhya Pradesh, India.

== Demographics ==
According to the 2011 Indian Census the "Bhicholi Hapsi Census Town" consists total population of 8,774 people amongst them 4,561 are males and 4,213 are females.
