= Gambhir River (Madhya Pradesh) =

Gambhir

Location
- Country: India
- State: Madhya Pradesh
- Cities: Mhow, Indore, Ujjain

Physical characteristics
- Source
  - location: Janapav, India
- Mouth: Shipra River
  - coordinates: 23°25′31″N 75°36′40″E

The Gambhir River is a river of Madhya Pradesh, India. It originates from Janapav near Mhow. It flows from south to north until its joins the Shipra River in Ujjain city, which later joins the Chambal River at the MP-Rajasthan boundary in Mandsaur district.

Narmada-Malwa-Gambhir river link project is a project linking Gambhir River to Narmada River will be commenced in 2024 with an estimated cost of Rs. 2,143 crore. The project will fill lake in Indore as well as will provides irrigation facility in 158 villages covering 50,000 hectares of area in Indore and Ujjain area of Madhya Pradesh. This is second project after Narmada Shipra Sihastha Link Pariyojana to link Narmada River to Malwa region.
