= Bhim Janmabhoomi =

Memorial in Madhya Pradesh, India

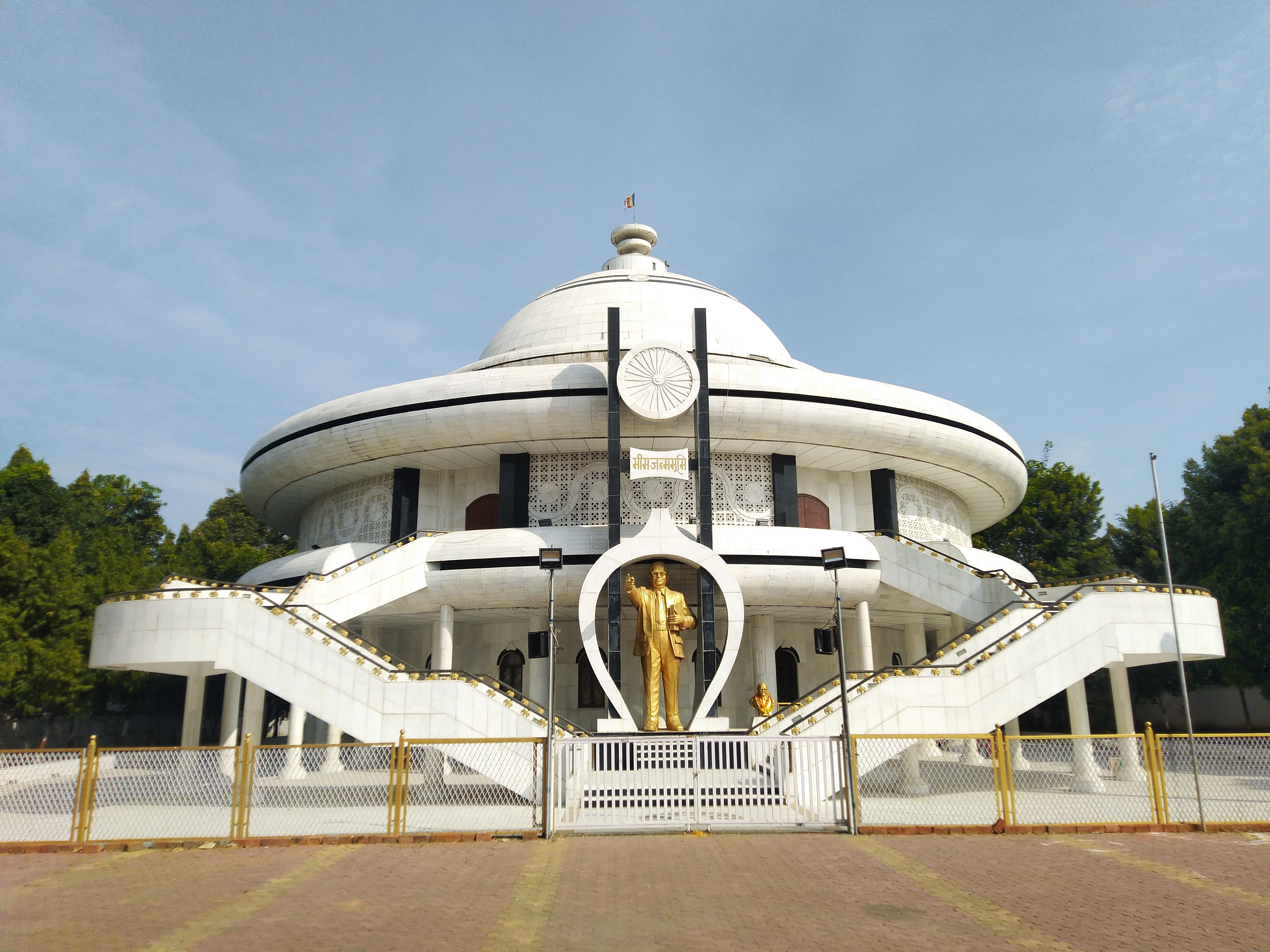
- Bhim Janmabhoomi, Dr. Bhimrao Ambedkar Memorial Mhow
- Location: Dr. Ambedkar Nagar (Mhow), Indore district, Madhya Pradesh, India
- Type: Monument and museum
- Beginning date: 1994
- Completion date: 2007
- Opening date: 14 April 2008; 18 years ago
- Dedicated to: B. R. Ambedkar

Bhim Janmabhoomi ('Bhim's birthplace') is a memorial dedicated to Bhimrao Ambedkar, located at Mhow (now Dr. Ambedkar Nagar) in Madhya Pradesh, India. This was birthplace of Ambedkar, who was born on 14 April 1891 in Mhow. where the local government built this grand memorial. This memorial was inaugurated on Ambedkar's 100th birth anniversary – 14 April 1991 by the then Chief Minister of Madhya Pradesh, Sunder Lal Patwa. The architecture of the memorial was composed by architect E.D. Nimgade. Later, On 14 April 2008, the 117th birthday of Ambedkar, inaugurated the memorial. Nearly 4.52 acres of land is connected to the memorial.

Every year, millions of Ambedkar's followers, Buddhists and other tourists visit this place, especially on 14 April and celebrated Ambedkar's birthday with pomp and gaiety. Mhow is 216 km away from Bhopal and 20 km away from Indore. This memorial is one of the Panchteerth, five holy sites related to the life of Babasaheb Ambedkar. The Madhya Pradesh government organizes 'Samajik Samrasta Sammelan' every year at Ambedkar Jayanti in Mhow. Apart from this, various social and cultural programs are organised here.

== History ==
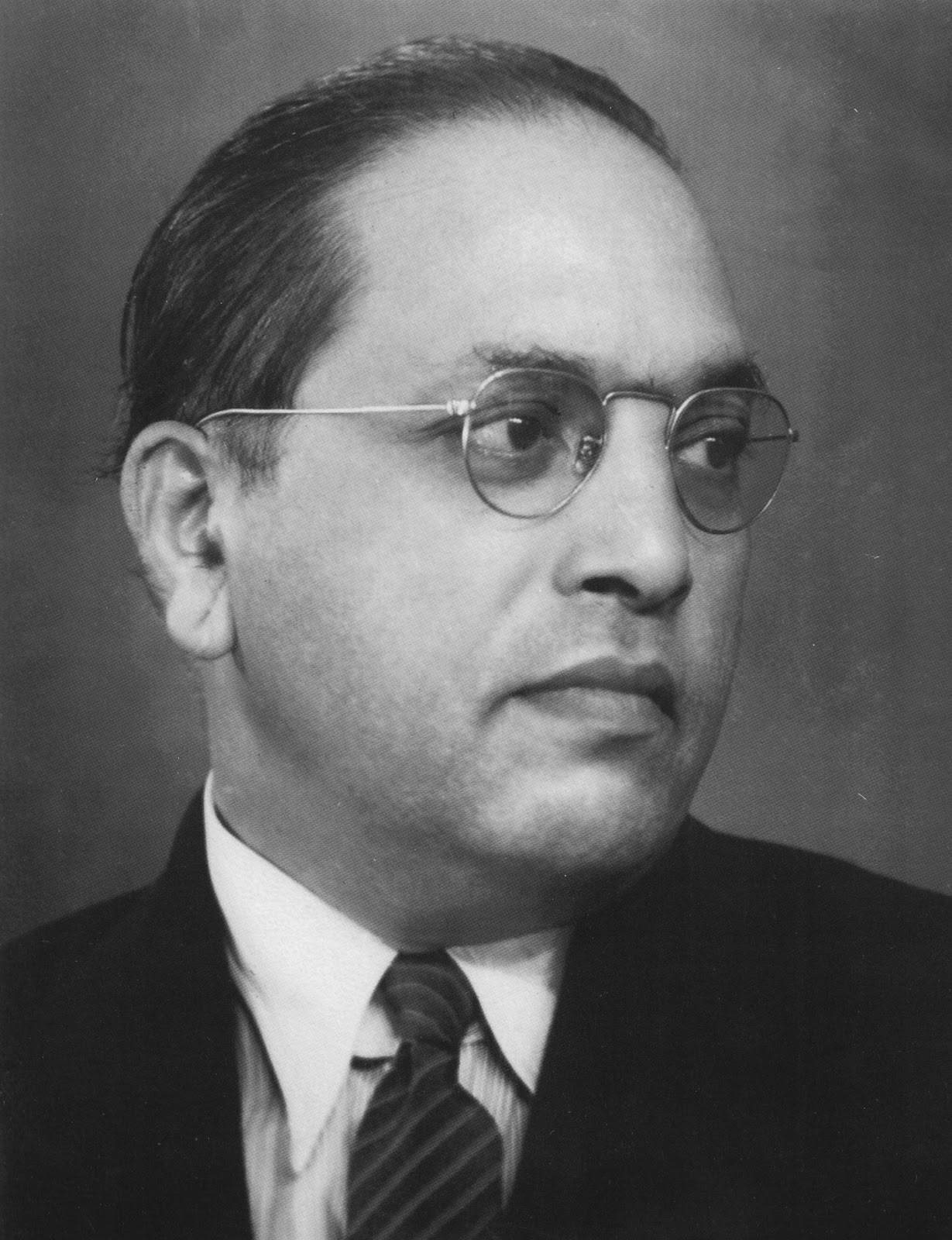
The memorial is dedicated to B. R. Ambedkar.

Ambedkar's father Ramji Maloji Sakpal completed his education at the Pantoji School in Pune and started his career as a teacher in the British army of India. He rose to prominence as the Prime Teacher and later as the headmaster. After 14 years of headmaster's work, the post of Subedar-major in the army got elevated to Mhow. Mhow was the Military Headquarters of War. Ambedkar was born on 14 April 1891, in the Kali Paltan area of Mhow, on the sack of Bhimabai and Ramji Sakpal. Ambedkar's birth name were Bhim, Bhiva and Bhimrao. Due to the abolition of untouchability, the formation of Indian constitution and Buddhism revival and other activities, the Babasaheb Ambedkar has to be considered as a notable person on the world stage. The birthplace of Babasaheb Ambedkar, who fought for the rights of the downtrodden, became a holy land and important place.

On 27 March 1991, Buddhist monk Dharmshil ji, the founder president of the "Dr. Babasaheb Ambedkar Memorial Society" organized a meeting of the committee. It was decided that Madhya Pradesh's Chief Minister Sunder Lal Patwa will be invited to foundation stone of the memorial. On the birthplace, memorial building design were created by architect E.D. Nimgade. Preparations for the celebration of the birthday festival were started. Bhanteji a (Buddhist monk) went to Mumbai to fetch the urn of Ambedkar's ashes and he returned to Mhow with the Urn of ashes on 12 April 1991. The foundation stone of the memorial was laid by the Chief Minister Sunder Lal Patwa on 14 April 1991, the 100th birth anniversary of Ambedkar. Atal Bihari Vajpayee and minister, Bherulal Patidar and Bhante Dharmashil were present this association. Later, the grand Bhim Janmabhoomi monument was built and the memorial inaugurated on 14 April 2008, 117th birth anniversary of Ambedkar.

== Structures ==
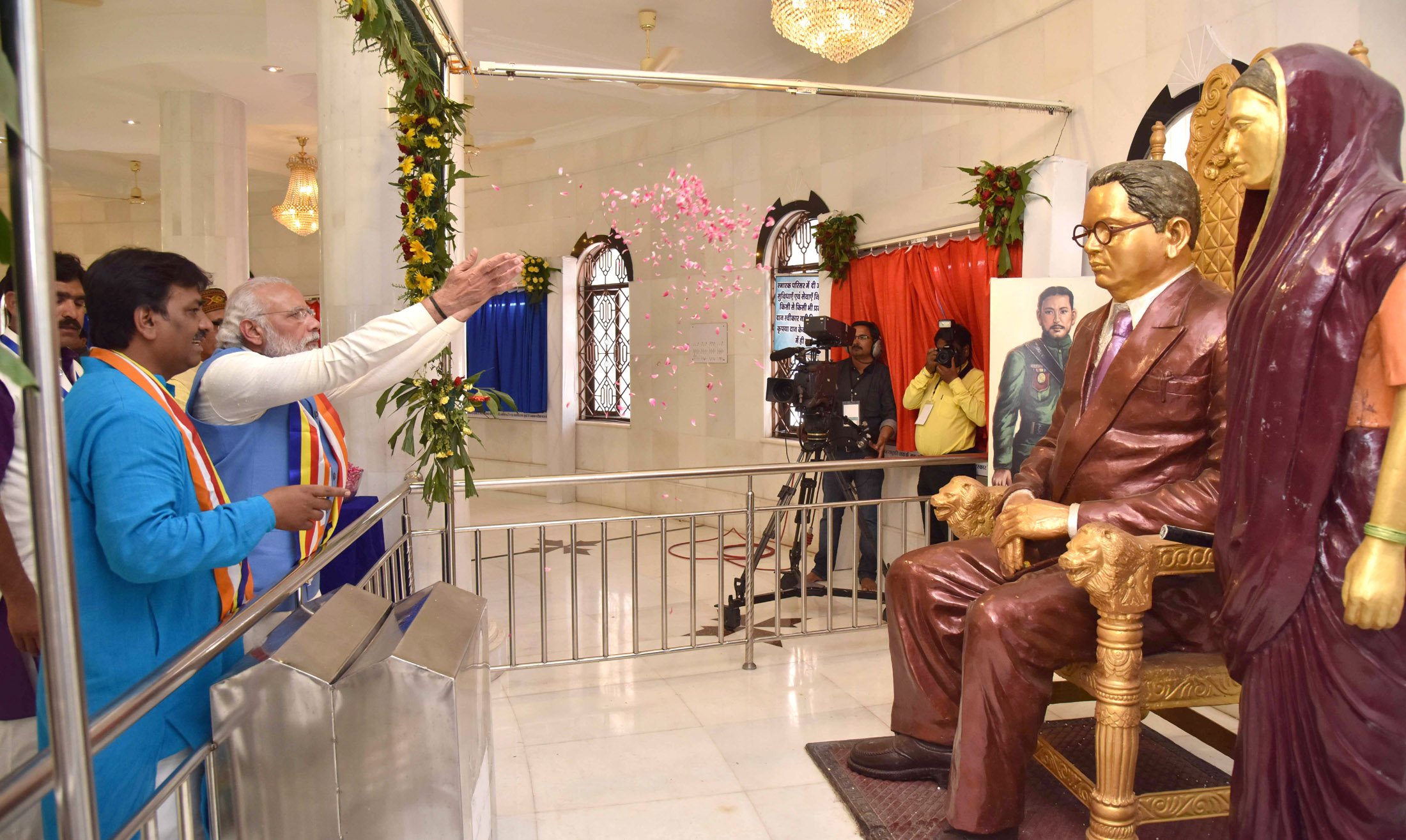
Statues of the Ambedkar and Ramabai, Prime Minister Narendra Modi in the memorial.

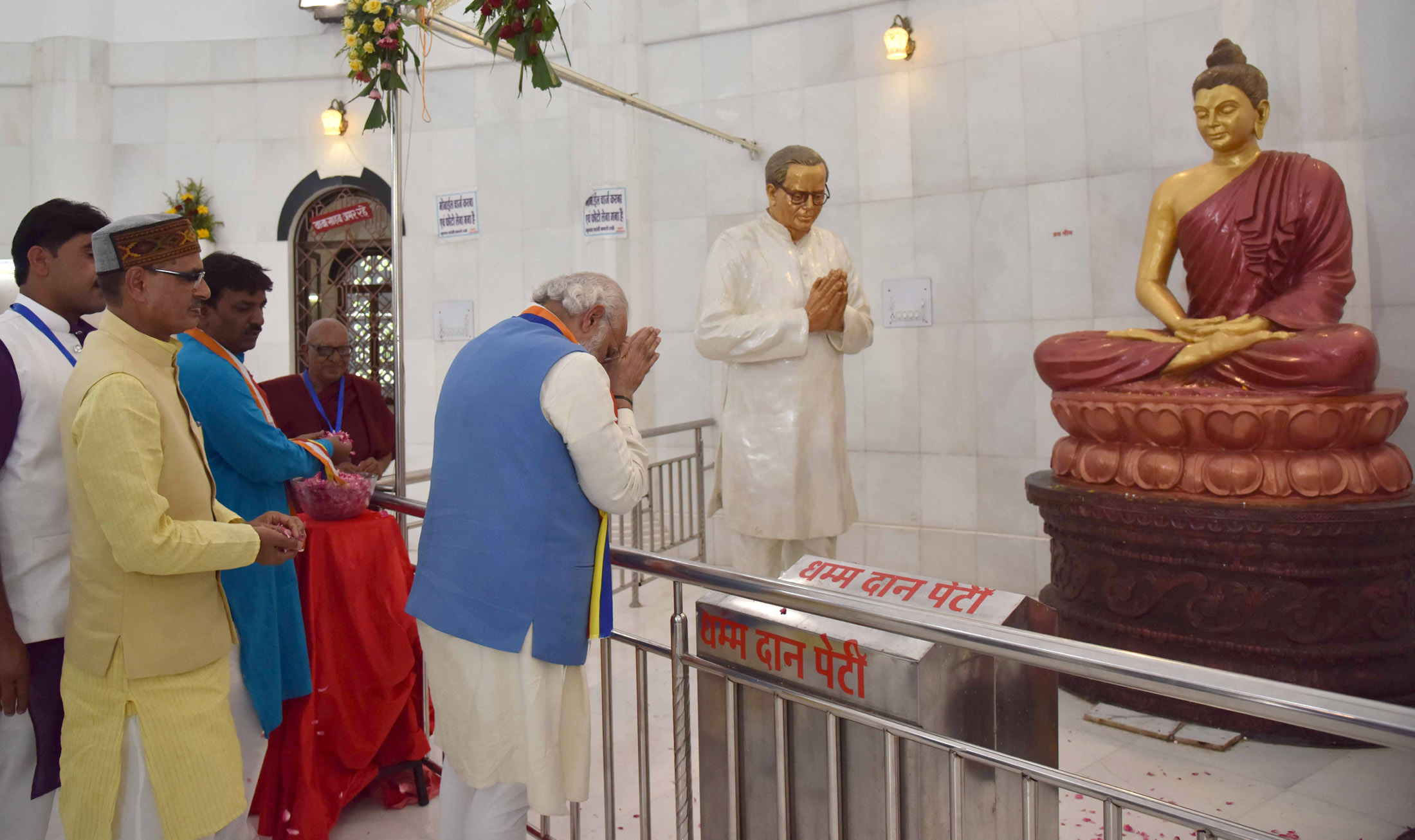
Statues of Ambedkar and Gautama Buddha.

The structure of the memorial is like a Buddhist architecture Stupa. A statue of Ambedkar is set up near the entrance to the memorial. on memorial Hindi letters "भीम जन्मभूमि" are carved above the statue and have a large Ashoka Chakra. There are two Buddhist flag in front of the monument and the top of the monument. Inside the memorial, many portraits of Babasaheb's life-style have been introduced. Also there are statues of Gautama Buddha, Babasaheb Ambedkar and Ramabai Ambedkar.

== See also ==
- List of things named after B. R. Ambedkar
