= College of Veterinary Sciences and Animal Husbandry, Mhow =

Autonomous veterinary university in India

- Type: Public
- Established: 1955
- Affiliations: Nanaji Deshmukh Veterinary Science University
- Dean: Dr. B.P. Shukla
- Location: Mhow, Madhya Pradesh, India; 22.5875°N 75.7828°E
- Campus: Urban, 257 acres
- Website: https://www.ndvsu.org/index.php/departments/jabalpur-vet-college/veterinary-college-mhow

The College of Veterinary Sciences and Animal Husbandry, Mhow is a constituent college of Nanaji Deshmukh Veterinary Science University, Jabalpur an autonomous veterinary university in India, and is a pioneer college in the field of veterinary sciences in India. It is one of the oldest veterinary colleges in Madhya Pradesh, was founded in 1955 the present building of the college was inaugurated by the first prime minister of India Pt.Jawaharlal Nehru on 12 November 1959.

== History ==
The College of Veterinary Science and Animal Husbandry, located in the Malwa region. Originally functioning as a satellite branch of Mathura Veterinary College under Agra University, the college awarded its first B.V.Sc. & A.H. degrees through Vikram University, Ujjain. The foundation stone was laid on 27 December 1954 by Shri V.V. Dravid, the Minister of Labor, alongside Dr. R.L. Kaushal, the founding Principal. Officially inaugurated on 12 July 1955, the college was initially named "College of Veterinary Science and Animal Husbandry cum Livestock Research Institute." In 1964, it joined Jawaharlal Nehru Krishi Vishwa Vidyalaya(JNKVV), Jabalpur, as a constituent unit. Later, in 2008, it became part of Rajmata Vijayaraje Sindia Krishi Vishwa Vidyalaya (RVSKVV), Gwalior. Finally, in 2009, the college was integrated into Madhya Pradesh Pashu Chikitsa Vigyan Vishwa Vidyalaya, which was renamed Nanaji Deshmukh Veterinary Science University (NDVSU) on 3 November 2012.

== Campus and student activities ==
The campus is situated approximately 5 km from Mhow cantonment and is 18 km from the Indore railway station on Mumbai Agra National highway No. 3.

It has a college building academic block, administrative block, teaching veterinary complex. It also has a dairy farm and a poultry farm. The college offers both undergraduate and postgraduate degrees in veterinary sciences and a diploma course in animal husbandry.

The college campus has accommodation facilities for its staff and students; there are two boys hostels namely Gandhi Hall and Tagore Hall, and a separate girls hostel. Every year in late January the college organises an annual cultural and sports week.

== Departments ==
1. Department of Veterinary Anatomy
2. Department of Veterinary Physiology and Biochemistry
3. Department of Livestock Production and Management
4. Department of Biochemistry
5. Department of Veterinary Microbiology
6. Department of Veterinary Pathology
7. Department of Animal Genetics and Breeding
8. Department of Veterinary Public Health
9. Department of Animal Nutrition
10. Department of Livestock Production Technology
11. Department of Veterinary and Animal Husbandry Extension
12. Department of Veterinary Parasitology
13. Department of Veterinary Public Health and Epidemiology
14. Department of Veterinary Pharmacology and Toxicology
15. Department of Veterinary Gynaecology and Obstetrics
16. Department of Veterinary Medicine
17. Department of Veterinary Surgery and Radiology
