= Mhow =

Mhow Mahu
- Cantonment Town
- Dr. Ambedkar Nagar
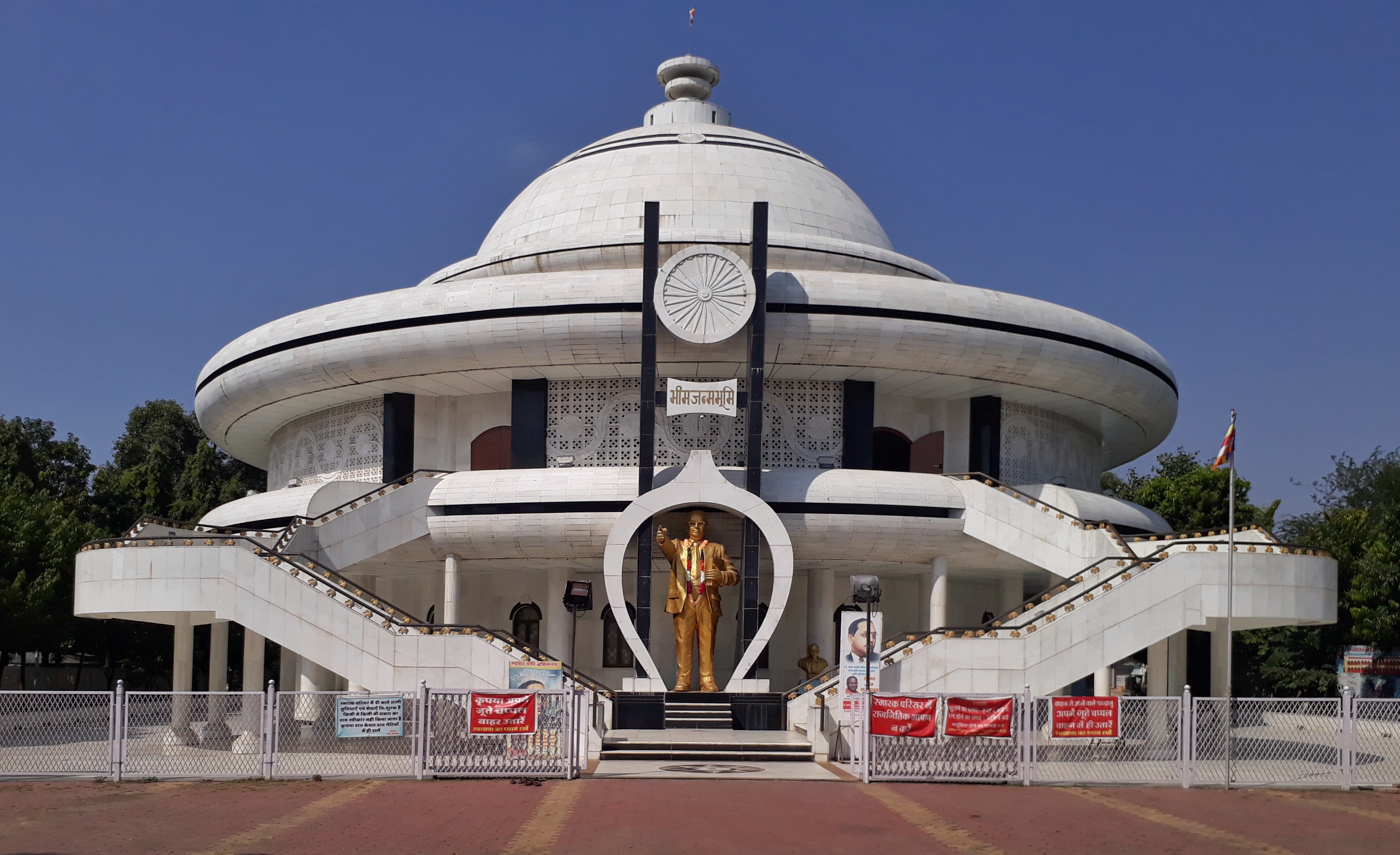
- Bhim Janmabhoomi, Dr. Babasaheb Ambedkar Memorial Mhow

- Location of Mhow in Madhya Pradesh Mhow (India)
- Coordinates: 22.55°N 75.76°E
- Country: India
- State: Madhya Pradesh
- District: Indore
- Named for: B. R. Ambedkar

Government
  - Body: Indore Metropolitan Region
- Elevation: 556 m (1,824 ft)

Population (2011)
  - Total: 85,023

Language
  - Official: Hindi
- Time zone: UTC+5:30 (IST)
- PIN: 453441
- Telephone code: 07324

Mhow, officially Dr. Ambedkar Nagar, is a town in the Indore district in Madhya Pradesh state of India. It is located 23 kilometres (14 mi) south-west of Indore city, towards Mumbai on the old -Agra Mumbai Road. It is the birthplace of the social and political reformer and the chairman of the Constitution Drafting Committee B. R. Ambedkar who was also independent India's first law minister. In 2003, the Government of Madhya Pradesh renamed the town Dr. Ambedkar Nagar in honour of Dr B R Ambedkar

It was a meter gauge railway district headquarters during the British Raj and after 1947.

== Demographics ==
As of 2011 India census, Mhow had a population of 85,023. Males constitute 54% of the population and females 46%. Mhow has an average literacy rate of 72%, higher than the national average of 59.5%; male literacy is 78%, and female literacy is 65%. The Mhow Cantt Cantonment Board has population of 81,702 of which 43,888 are males while 37,814 are females as per report released by Census India 2011.

The population of children aged 0-6 is 9308 which is 11.39% of total population of Mhow Cantt (CB). In Mhow Cantt Cantonment Board, the female sex ratio is 862 against state average of 931. Moreover, the child sex ratio in Mhow Cantt is around 908 compared to Madhya Pradesh state average of 918. The literacy rate of Mhow Cantt city is 85.78%; higher than the state average of 69.32%. In Mhow Cantt, male literacy is around 90.42% while the female literacy rate is 80.37%.

== Notable sites ==
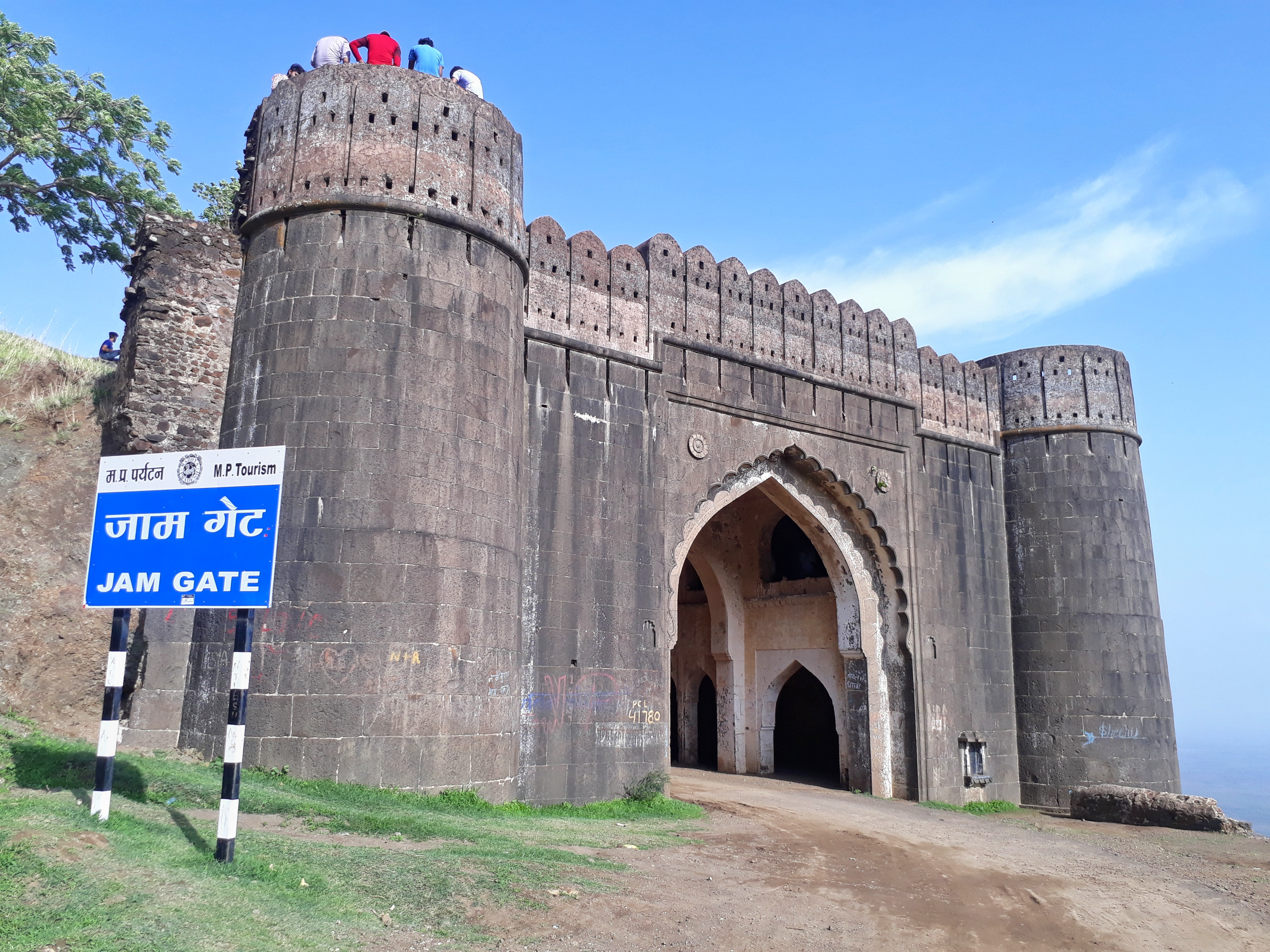
Jamgate

Tourist spots in and around Mhow include:

- Bhim Janmabhoomi, a memorial
- Patalpani waterfall
- Janapav hill Temple
- Christ Church, Mhow
- JamGate

== In popular culture ==
Some books about Mhow include:

- Diaries and letters from India, 1895-1900 by Violet Jacob; Non fiction

There are references to Mhow in the works of Rudyard Kipling:

- His poem "The Ladies"
- A reference to the train from Ajmer to Mhow in Chapter 1 of The Man Who Would Be King (1888)
- A reference to Mhow in chapter 11 of Kim (1901)

== Notable people ==
- B.R. Ambedkar, politician
- Catherine Arnott, British medical doctor and suffragette born in Mhow
- Shankar Lakshman, hockey player
- Vijay Kumar (sport shooter) soldier, marksman
- Kishan Lal, hockey player
- Rajyavardhan Singh Rathore soldier, marksman
- Mukesh Kumar, golfer
- Denis Compton English cricketer and footballer stationed in Mhow during World War II
- Adela Florence Nicolson, poet lived in Mhow from 1895 to 1900
- Violet Jacob Scottish writer and illustrator in Mhow from 1895 to 1900
- Dorothy Gill, opera singer and actress born in Mhow
- J. G. Greig, Cricketer, born in Mhow
- Rajeev John George, housing rights activist
- Cyrus Sahukar, actor, born in Mhow

== Universities and colleges in the Tehsil ==
- Dr. B.R. Ambedkar University of Social Sciences
- Army War College, Mhow
- Military College of Telecommunication Engineering
- College of Veterinary Sciences and Animal Husbandry, Mhow
- IIT Indore
- IIM Indore
