= Janapav =

Janapav Janapav Kuti
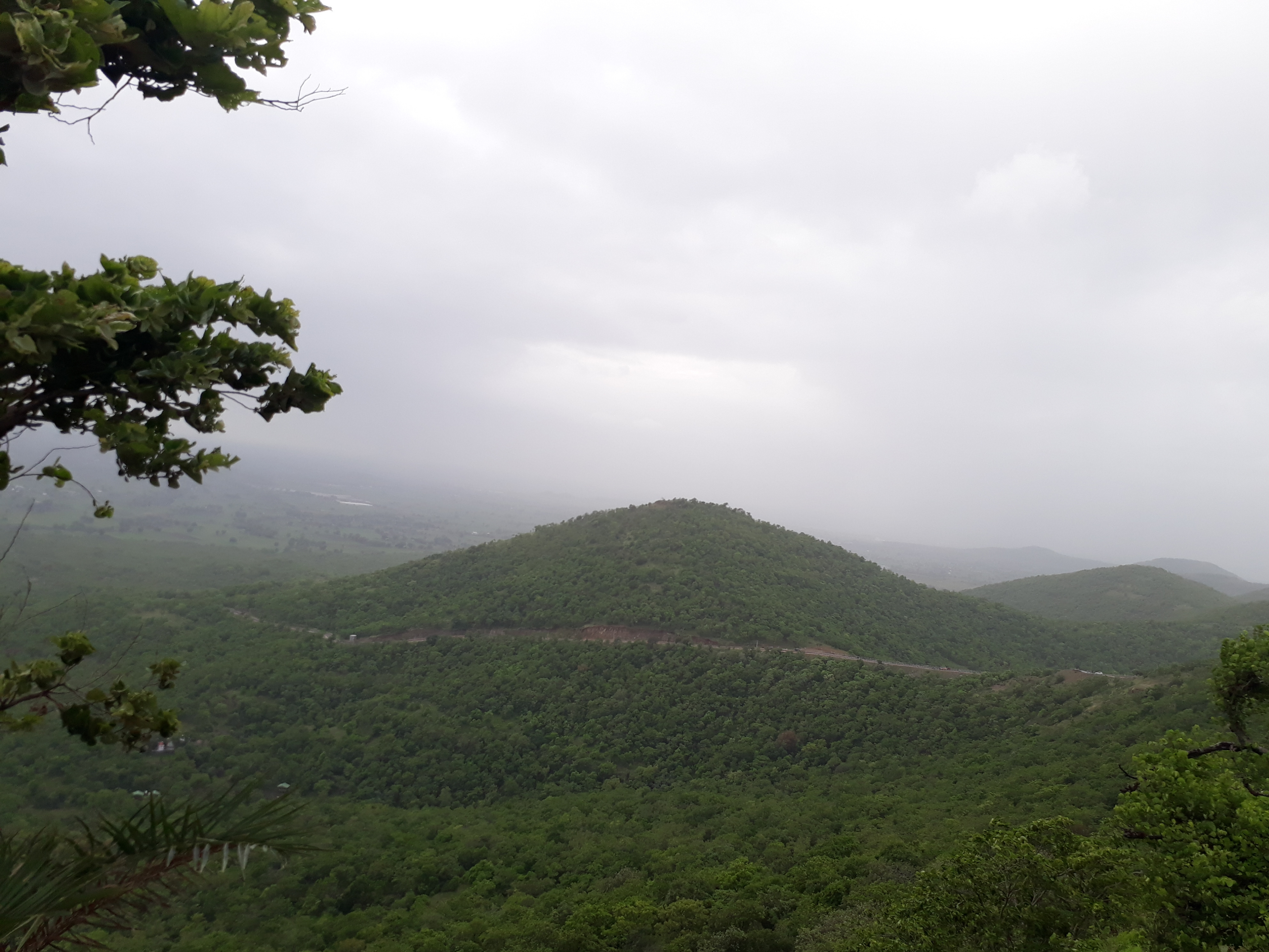
- Janapav Kuti Mhow
- Country: India
- State: Madhya Pradesh

Languages
  - Official: Hindi
- Time zone: UTC+5:30 (IST)
- PIN: 453441
- Vehicle registration: MP-

Janapav also known as Janapav Kuti is a mountain at altitude of 854m from sea level and the highest peak in the Vindhayanchal range. It is located on the Indore-Mumbai highway, near the village of Janapav Kuti in Mhow Tehsil, Indore district of Madhya Pradesh. It is 45 kilometers from Indore. The mountain is surrounded by dense forests. The place is quite popular among trekkers. The place is also known for being the birthplace of Lord Parshurama and for a fair that is held here every year on Kartik Purnima which is the first full moon after Diwali.

== Historical importance ==
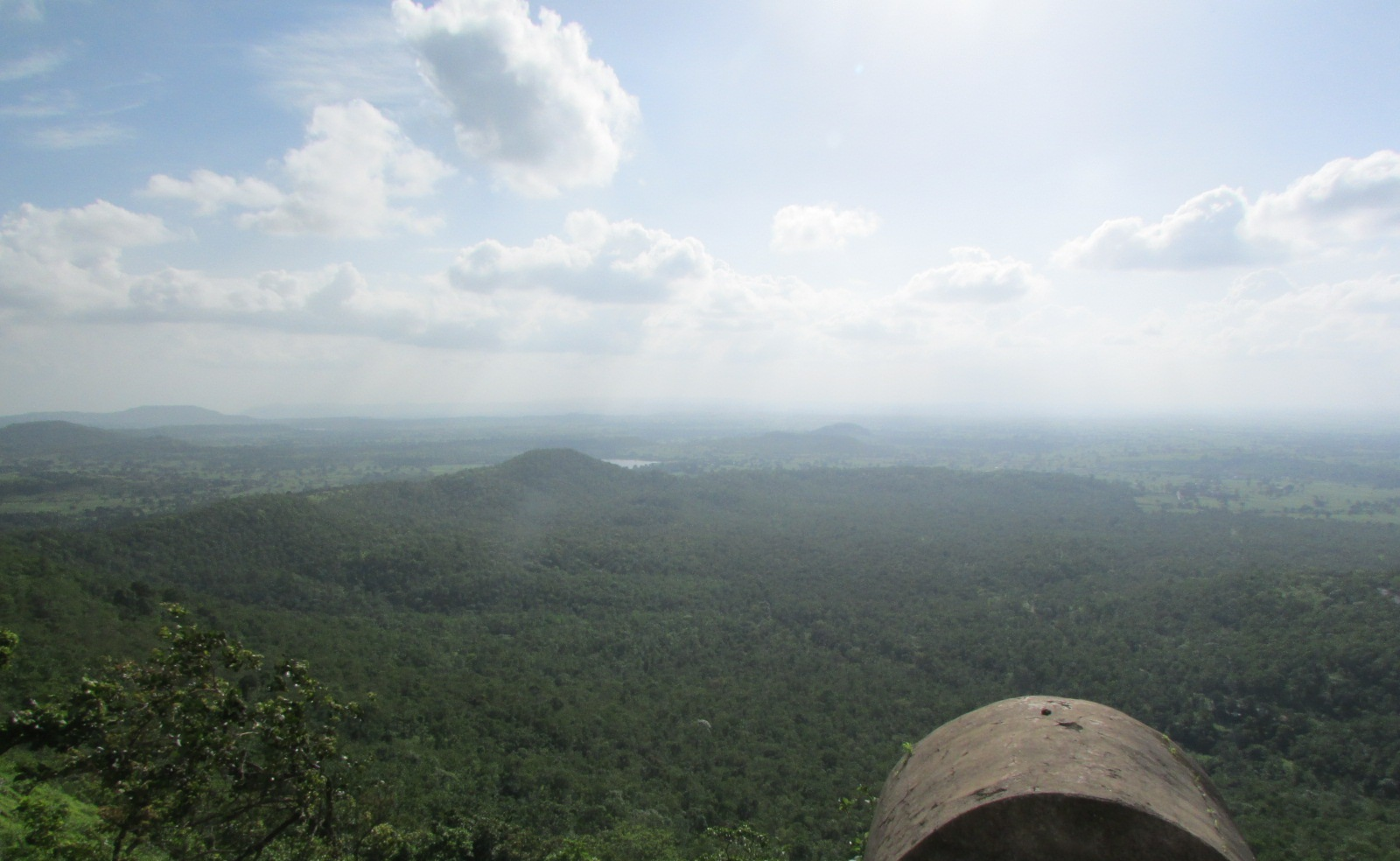
A view from the top of Janapav

As per the legend, it is the birthplace of Parshurama, the sixth avatar of Vishnu, and is considered sacred by the Hindu community. At the top of the hill is an ashram of Jamadagni, the father of Parashurama. His mother Renuka was a renowned medical practitioner and had then grown a variety of herbs on the hill and its surroundings. As per some reports, even today, many Ayurvedic alternative medicine practitioners from across the country arrive at the hill in search of herbs.

As per the folklore, twelve rivers originate from the tank situated on this hill, including Chambal, Saraswati & Nakheri.

== Development ==
As many devotees visit the temple every year, a road was constructed from highway to the top of the mountain to facilitate easy transport. In May 2008, the government of Madhya Pradesh announced to develop the site into an international pilgrimage centre. The development package was sanctioned for the construction of road, electrification, arrangement of drinking water, renovation of the pond, construction of a temple, ambulatory path, museum, and a research seat.

== Travel and accommodation ==
The place is well connected and transport is available to visit Janapav from Indore and Mhow. Popular for its scenery, Janapav is also a popular trekking and cycling destination. Good connectivity with Indore helps with tourism.

== Gallery ==
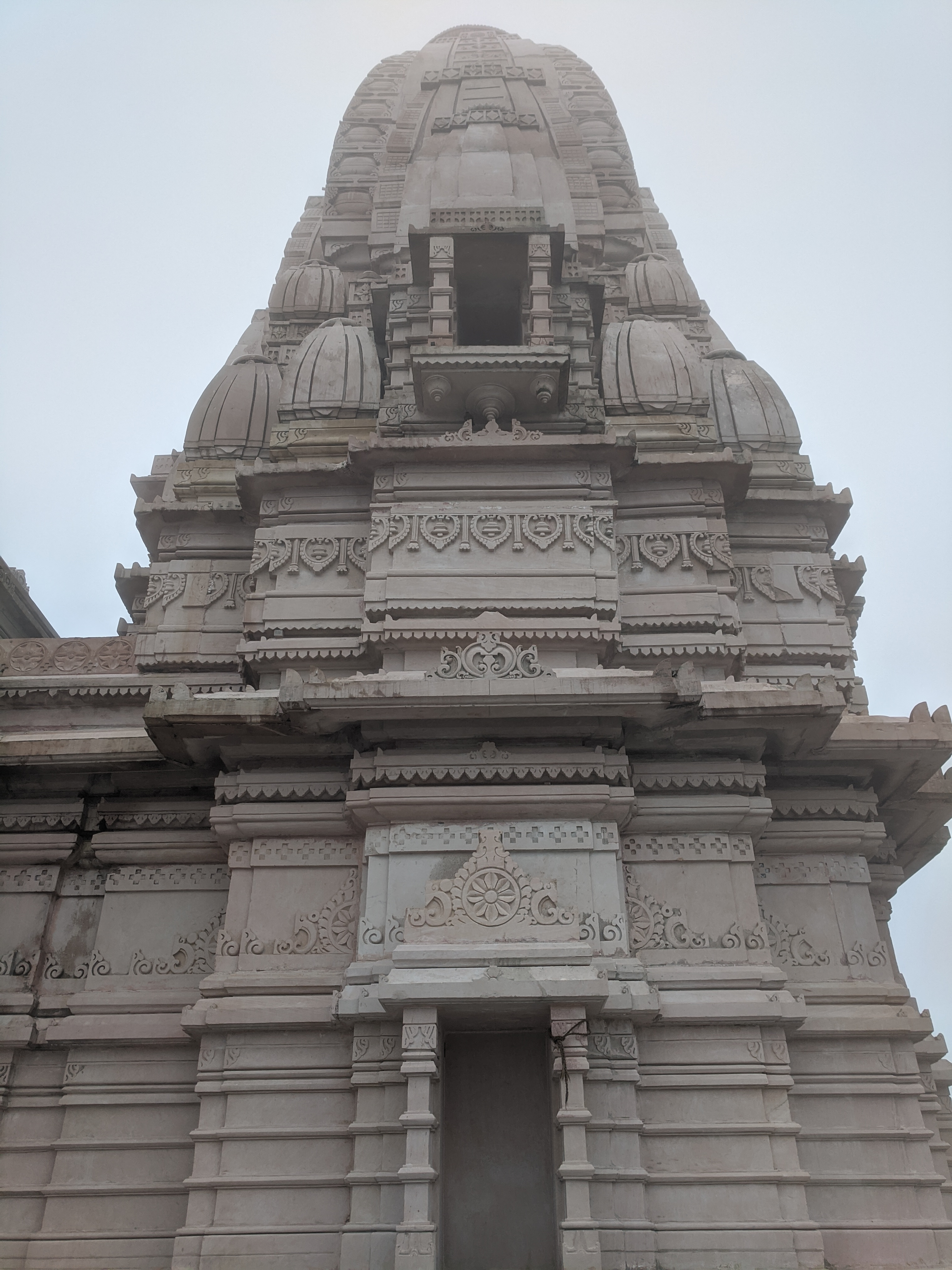
New Temple of Parshuram in Janapav Kuti

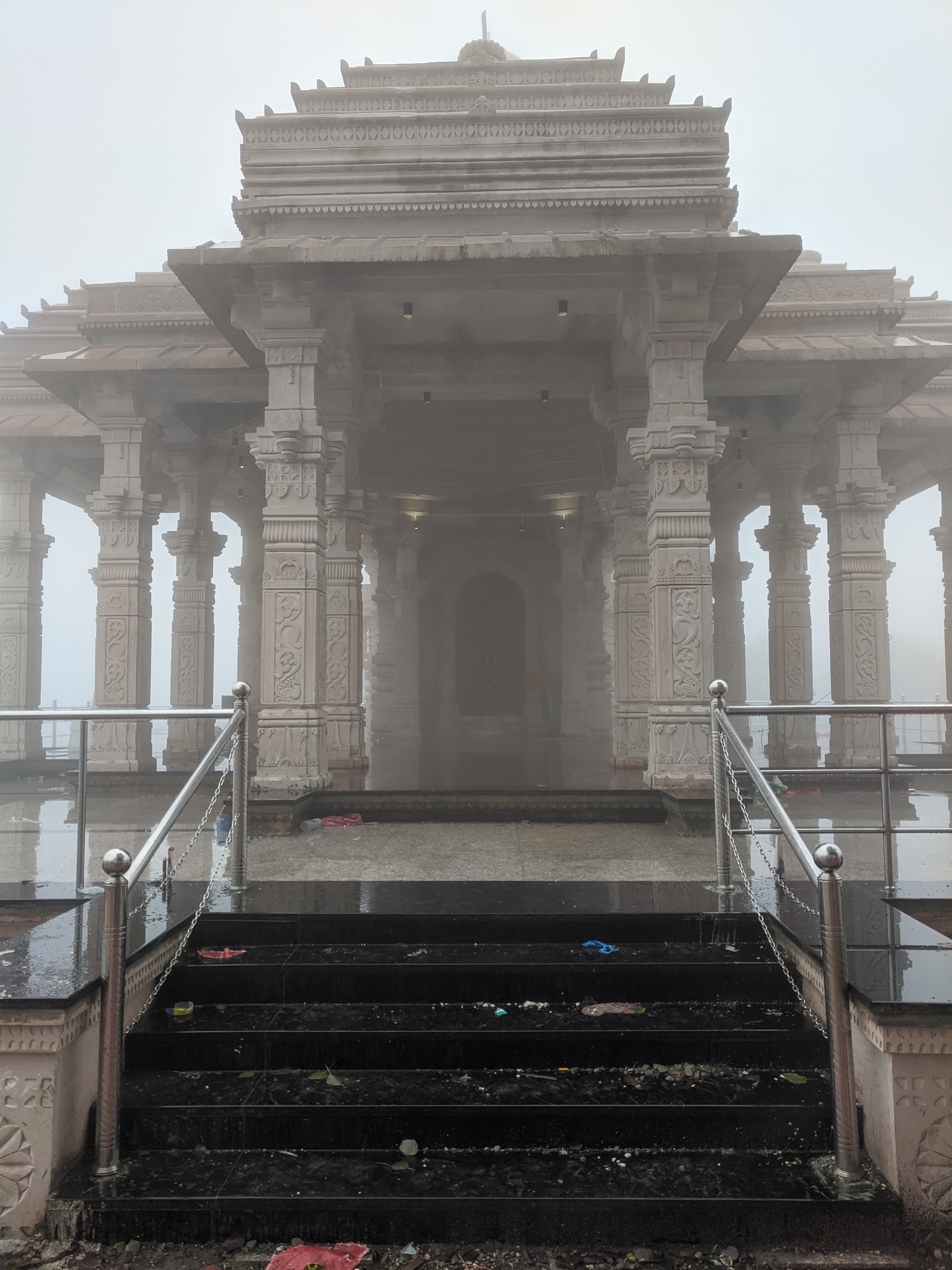
New Temple of Parshuram in Janapav Kuti

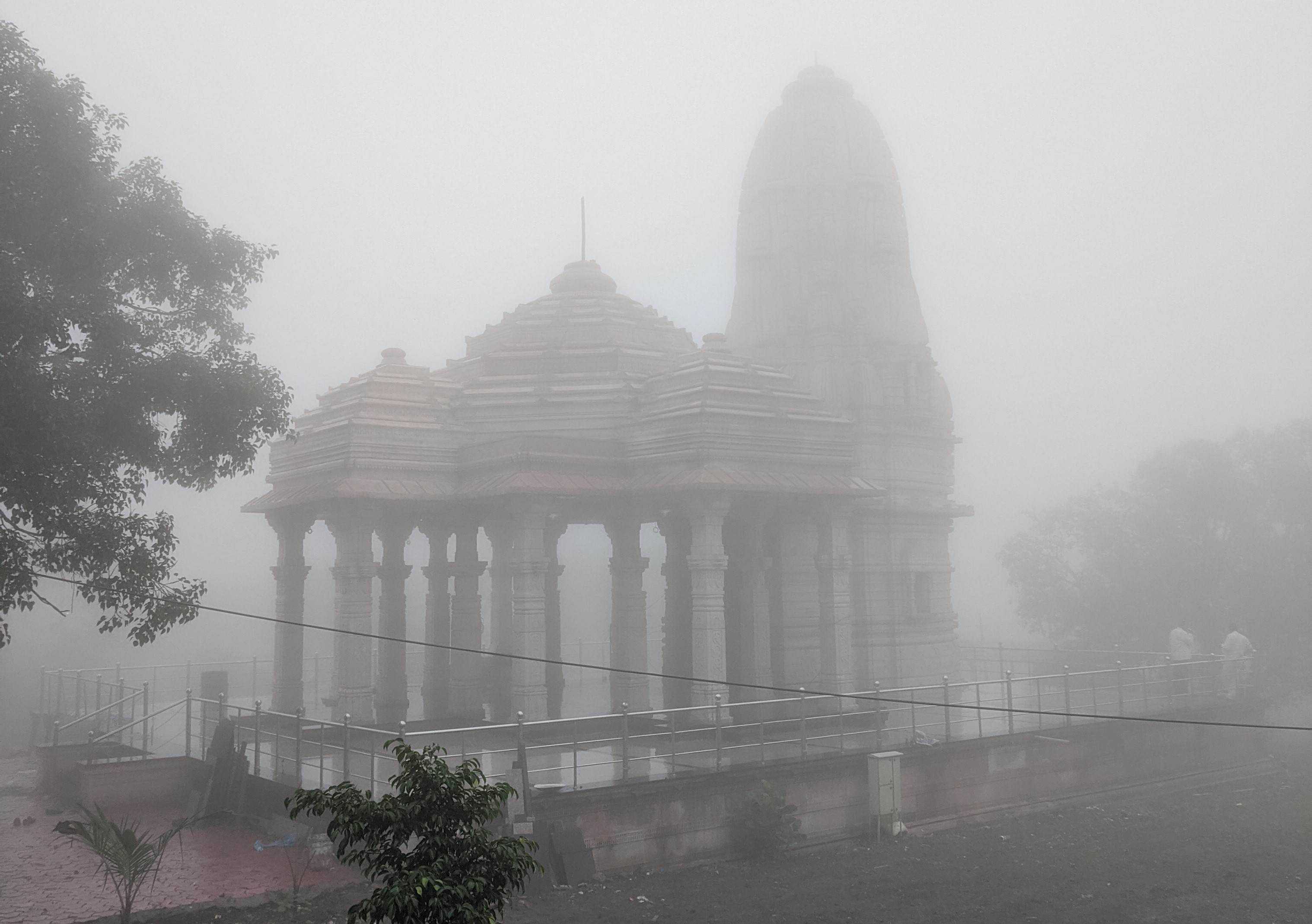
New Temple of Parshuram in Janapav Kuti

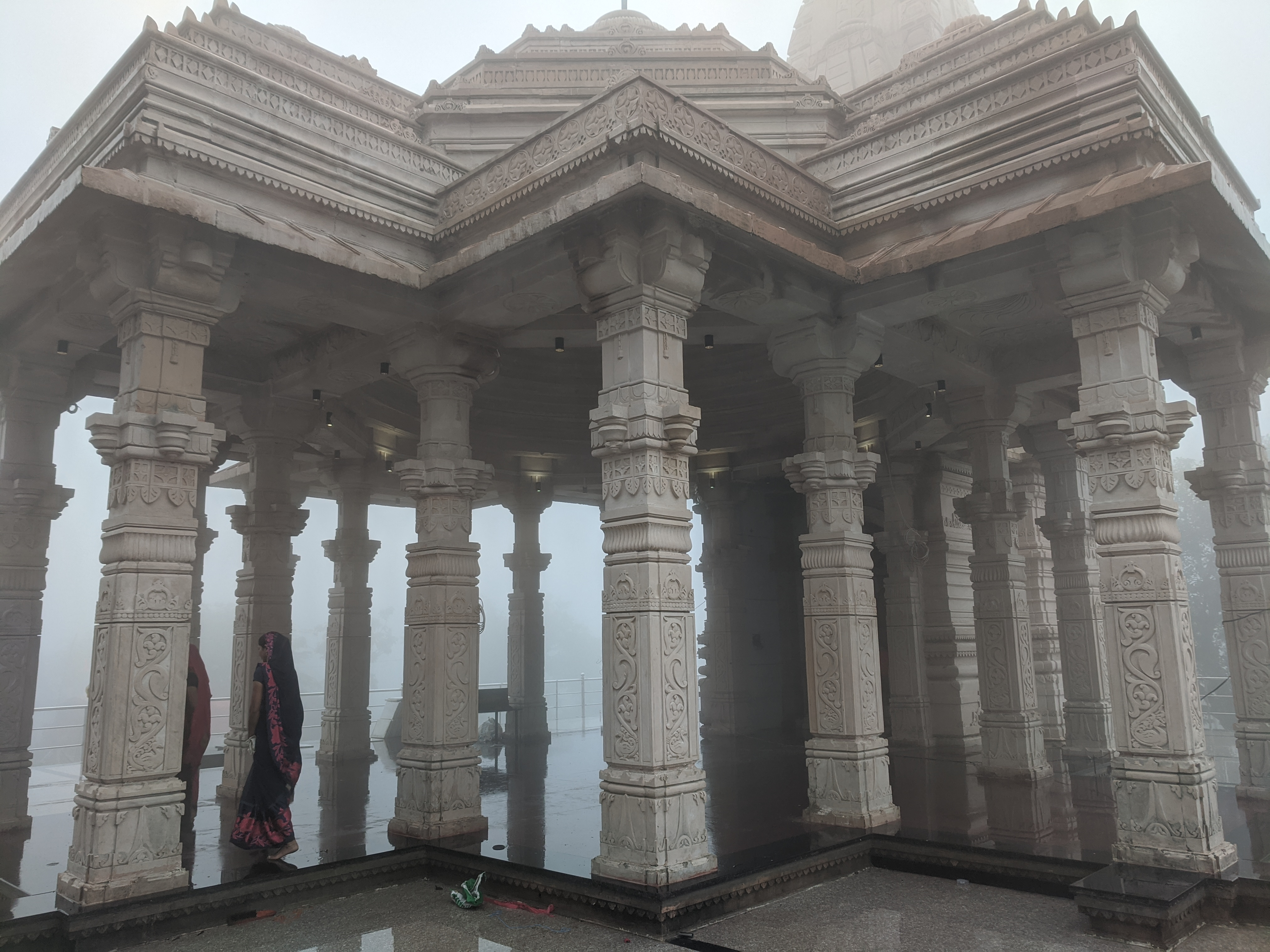
New Temple of Parshuram in Janapav Kuti

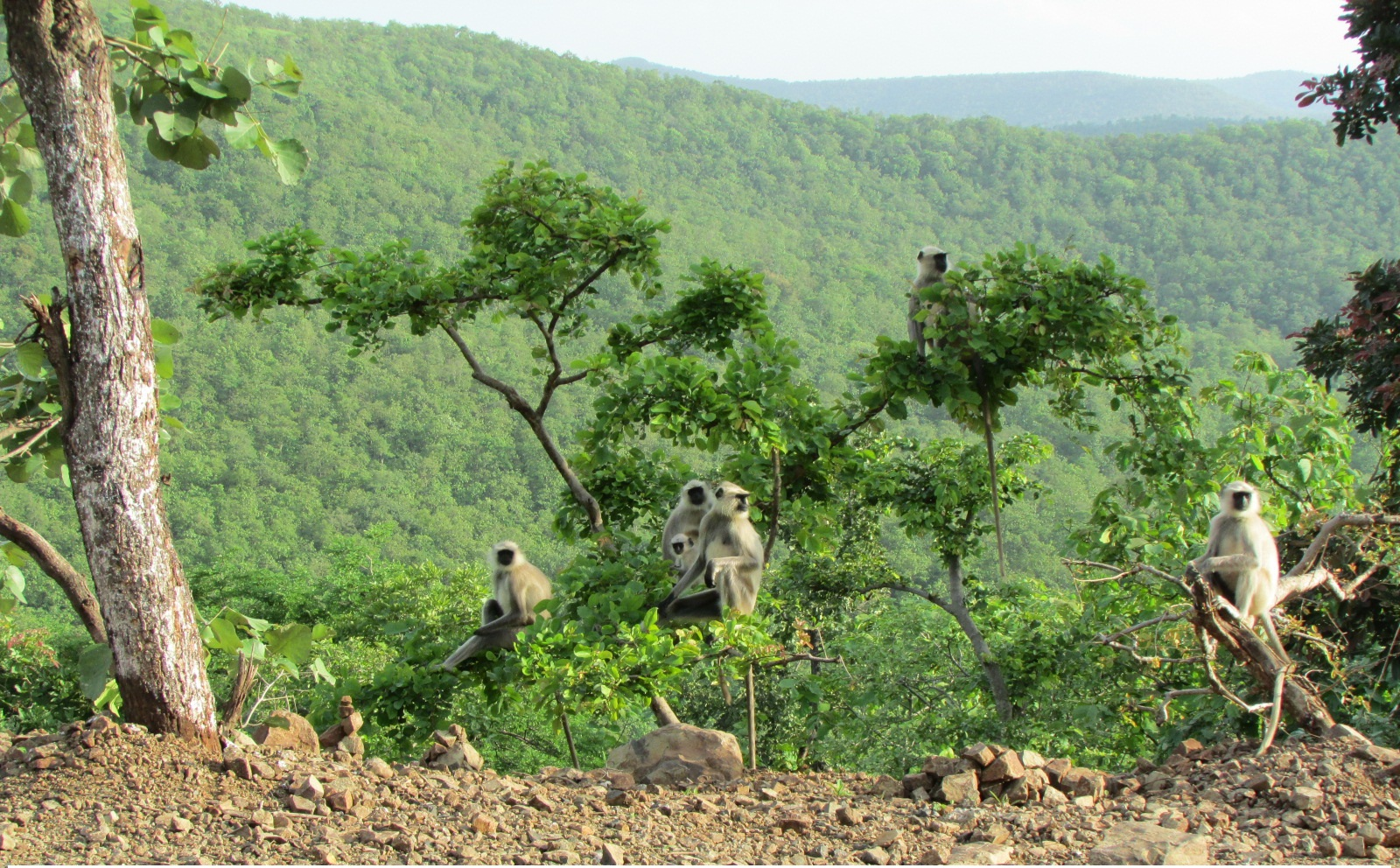
This is the common sight while travelling to Janapav
