= Hatod =

Hatod Hattode
- Town
- Location in Madhya Pradesh, India Hatod (India)
- Coordinates: 22.8°N 75.73°E
- Country: India
- State: Madhya Pradesh
- District: Indore
- Elevation: 559 m (1,834 ft)

Population (2023)
  - Total: 14,300

Languages
  - Official: Hindi
- Time zone: UTC+5:30 (IST)
- Postal code: 453111
- ISO 3166 code: IN-MP
- Vehicle registration: MP

Hatod is a town and a nagar parishad in Indore district in the Indian state of Madhya Pradesh.

== Geography ==
Hatod is located at 22.8°N 75.73°E. It has an average elevation of 559 metres (1,833 feet).

== Demographics ==
As of 2001 India census, Hatod had a population of 9,030. Males constitute 51% of the population and females 49%. Hatod has an average literacy rate of 54%, lower than the national average of 59.5%: male literacy is 67%, and female literacy is 39%. In Hatod, 16% of the population is under 6 years of age.
