= Depalpur, Madhya Pradesh =

Depalpur Deypaulpoor
- Town
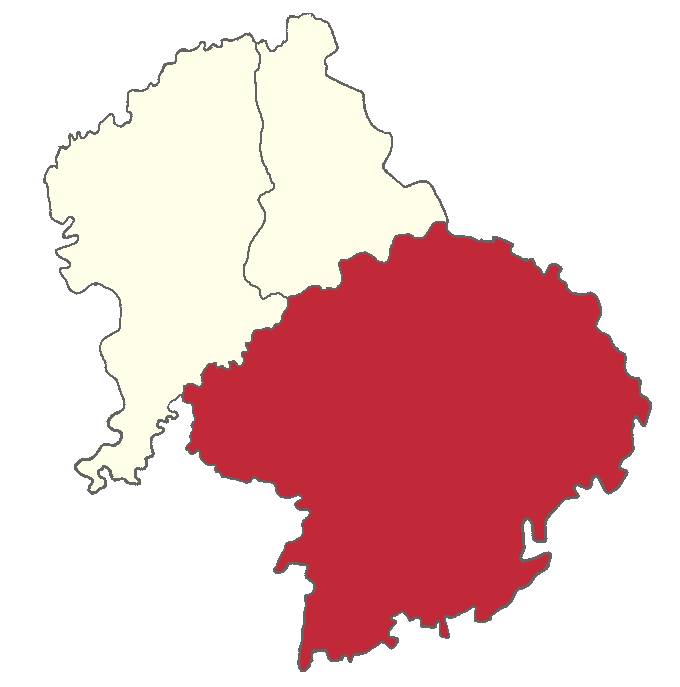
- Depalpur Tehsil in Indore district (MP)

- Location in Madhya Pradesh, India Depalpur (India)
- Coordinates: 22.85°N 75.55°E
- Country: India
- State: Madhya Pradesh
- District: Indore

Government
  - Type: Municipal corporation
- Elevation: 533 m (1,749 ft)

Population (2011)
  - Total: 25,300

Languages
  - Official: Hindi, Malvi Language
- Time zone: UTC+5:30 (IST)
- Postal code: 453115
- ISO 3166 code: IN-MP
- Vehicle registration: MP

Depalpur is a town of shri 24 avtaar mandir belong God Vishnu and a Nagar panchayat in Indore district in the state of Madhya Pradesh, India. Depalpur is around 41.7Km from Indore.

== Origin of name ==
According to tradition, the town is named after the Pala dynasty ruler Devapala (reigned 810s-845 CE).

== History ==
In the Ain-i-Akbari, Depalpur is mentioned as one of the 10 mahals of the Ujjain sarkar in Malwa Subah. Later, it became part of the Princely state of Indore. The Zagirdar of Depalpur was Meer sayyed Abdul kadir Hussain sahb .(Dada miya)After his demise, his descendants distributed the family property to depalpuri Sayyed and Kazi families.

== Geography ==
Depalpur is located at 22.85°N 75.55°E. It has an average elevation of 533 metres (1748 feet).

== Demographics ==
As of 2001 India census, Depalpur had a population of 15,200. Males constitute 51% of the population while the females constitute the remaining 49%. Depalpur has an average literacy rate of 57%, lower than the national average of 59.5%. The male literacy rate is at 69%, while the female literacy rate is at 45%. In Depalpur, 16% of the population is under 6 years of age.

== Transport ==
The nearest airport is Devi Ahilya Bai Holkar Airport, Indore.
