= Indore district =

District of Madhya Pradesh, India

Coordinates: 22°40′N 75°45′E

- District of Madhya Pradesh
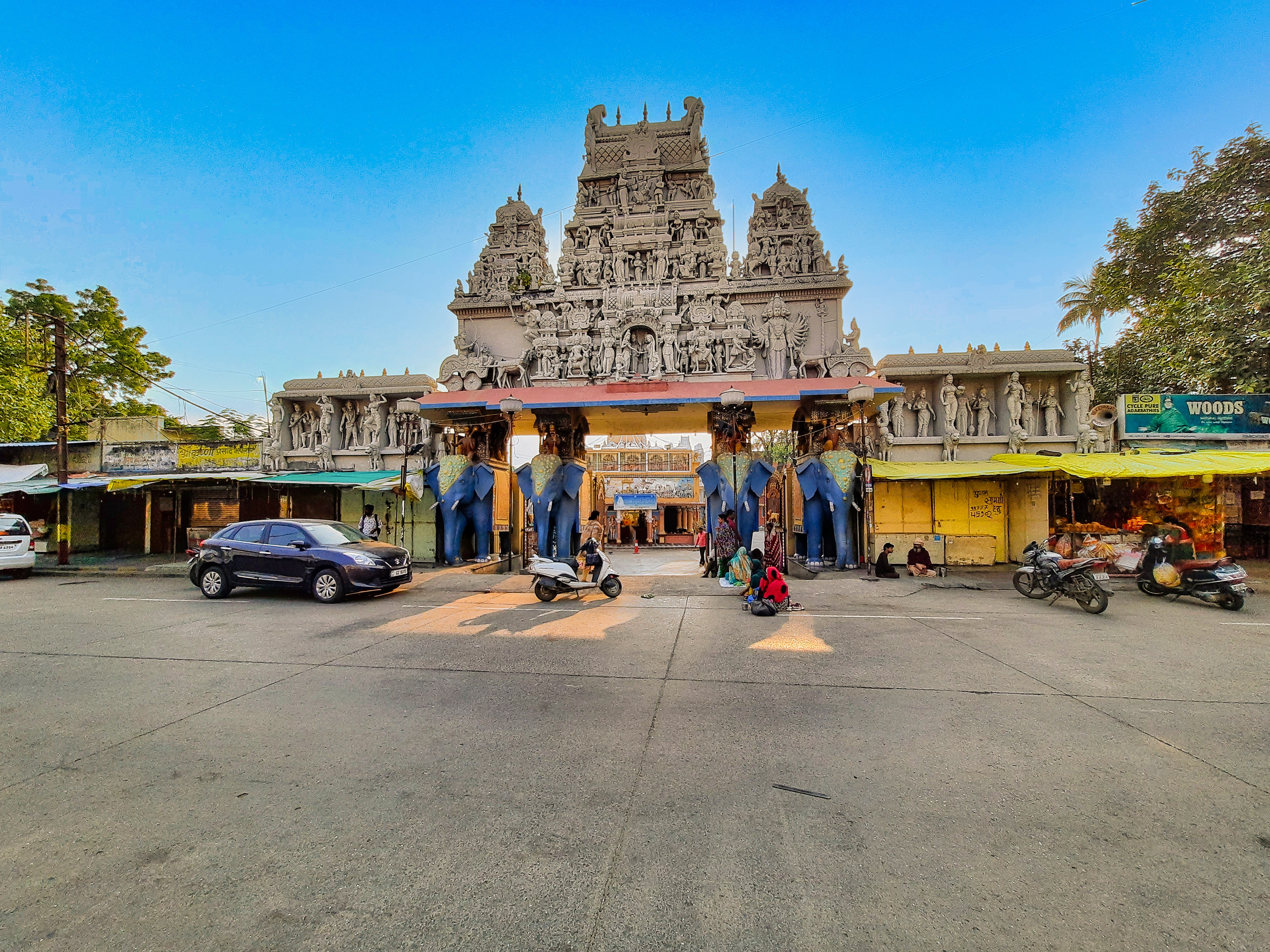
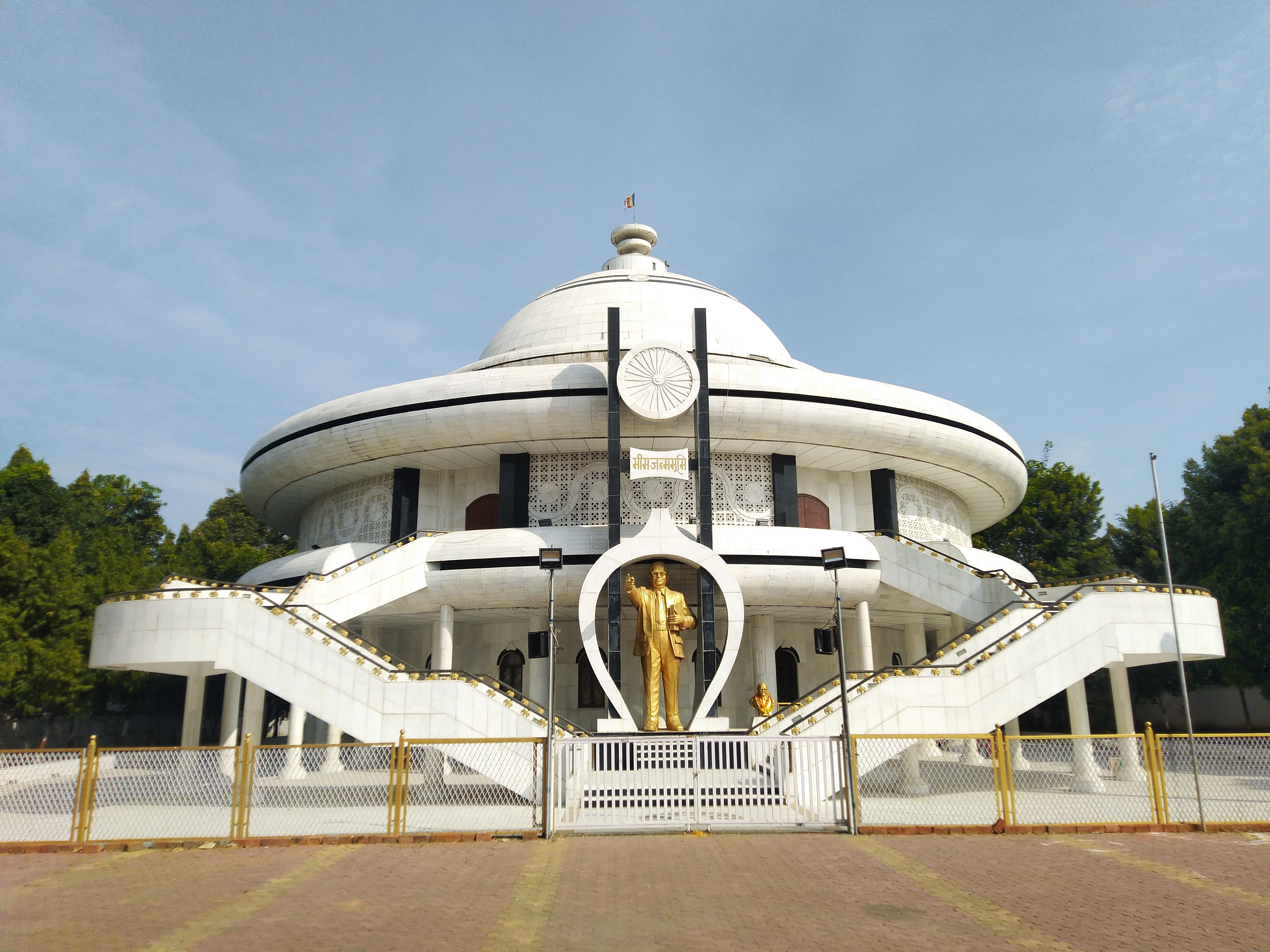
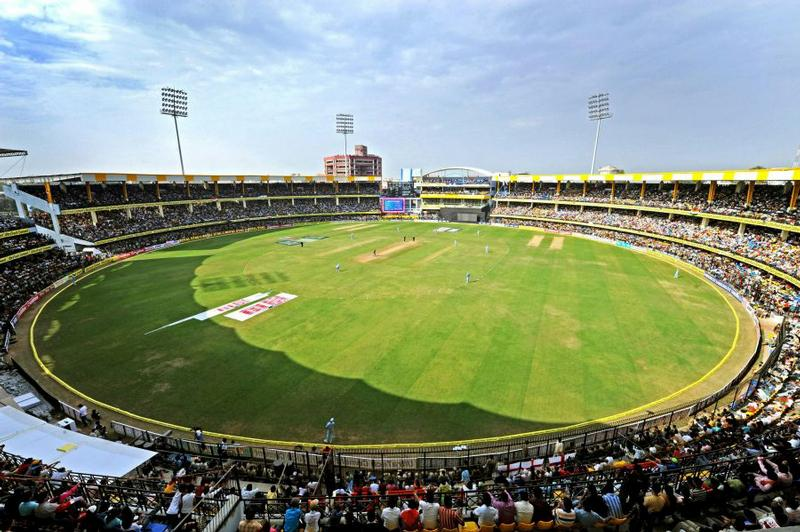
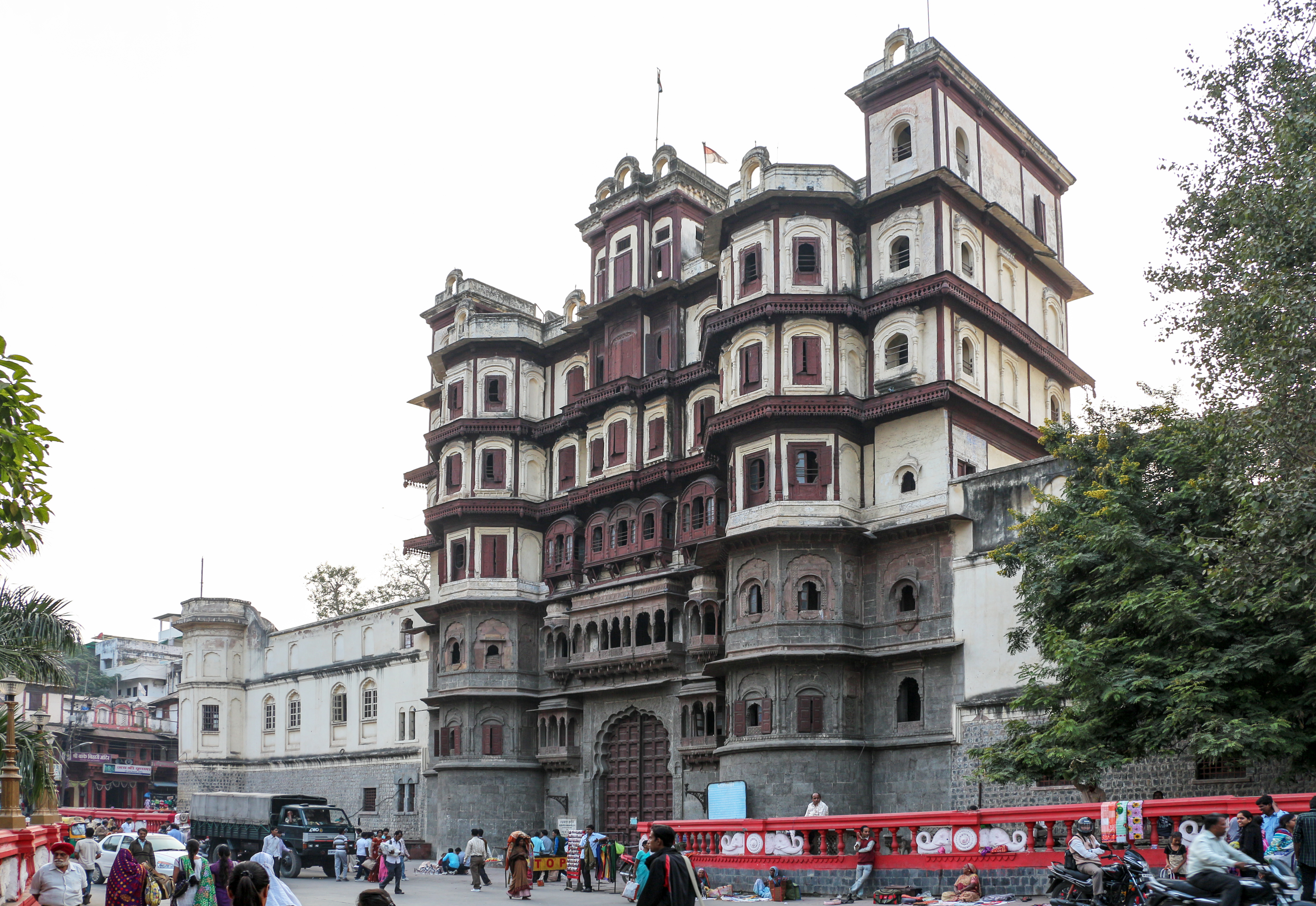
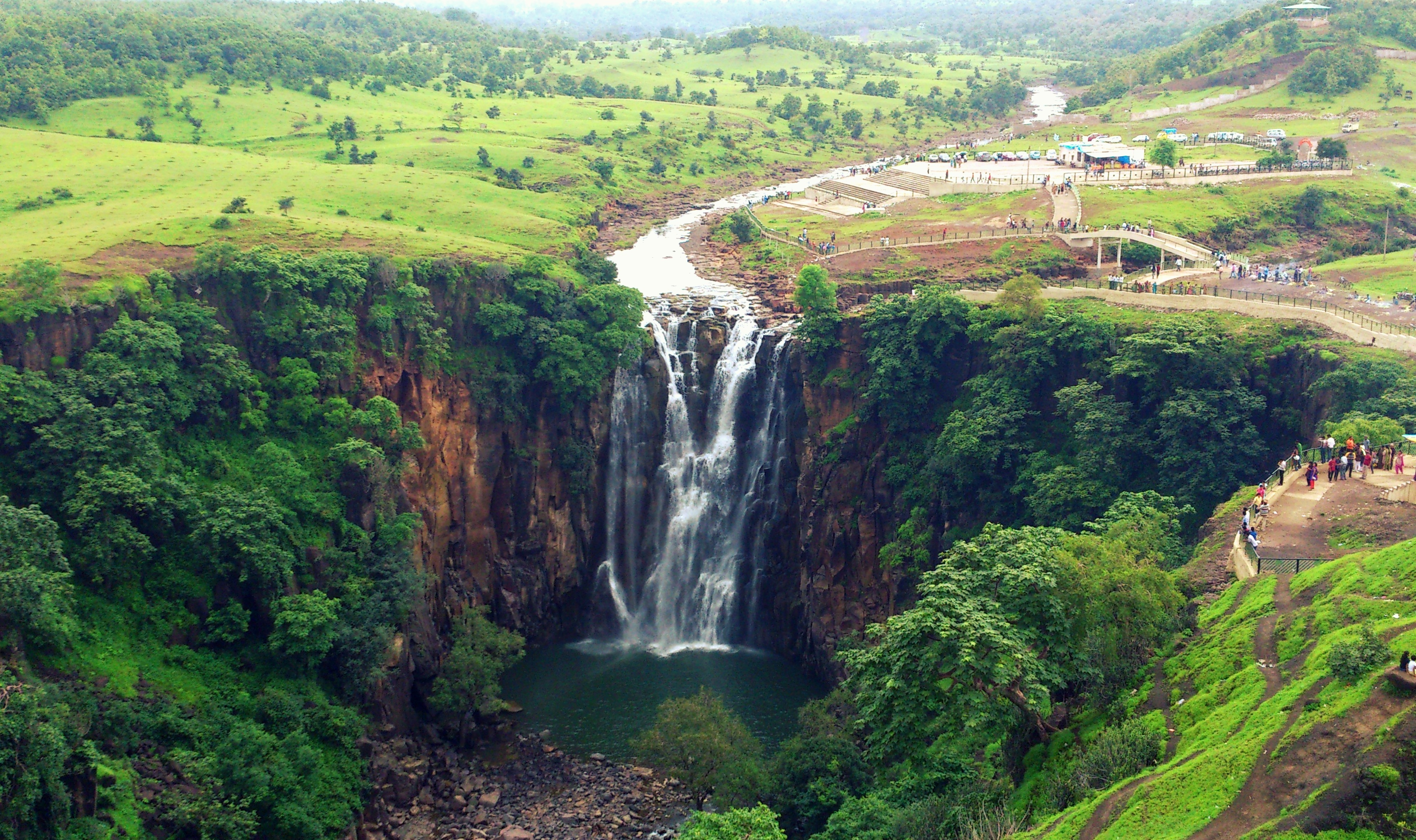
- Clockwise from top-left: Annpurna Temple, Bhim Janmabhoomi in Mhow, Rajwada Palace, Patalpani waterfall, Stadium in Indore

- Location of Indore district in Madhya Pradesh
- Country: India
- State: Madhya Pradesh
- Division: Indore
- Headquarters: Indore

Government
  - Lok Sabha constituencies: Indore, Dhar
  - Vidhan Sabha constituencies: 9

Area
  - Total: 3,898 km^{2} (1,505 sq mi)

Population (2011)
  - Total: 5,276,697 (provisional)
  - Density: 1,354/km^{2} (3,506/sq mi)

Demographics
  - Literacy: 82.3%
  - Sex ratio: 924
- Time zone: UTC+05:30 (IST)
- Average annual precipitation: 1062 mm
- Website: imcindore.mp.gov.in, indore.nic.in

Indore district (Hindi pronunciation: [ɪn̪d̪ɔːɾ]) is a district of Madhya Pradesh state in central India. It is believed that the city is named after its Indreshwar Mahadev Temple, where Indra is the presiding deity as Indra+Oor. The Gupta inscriptions name Indore as "Indrapura". It is also called the administrative capital. This district forms part of the Indore Division.

As of 2011, it was the most populous of the 50 districts in Madhya Pradesh.

Indore is the administrative center of district, and largest city of Madhya Pradesh.

== Location ==
The Indore District has an area of 3,898 km^{2} and borders the districts of Ujjain to the north, Dewas to the east, Khargone to the south, and Dhar to the west.

=== Rivers ===
The two main rivers of the Indore district are the Chambal, in the west, (originating in the Vindhya range south of Mhow) and the Kshipra, a tributary of the Chambal river, in the east. Other small rivers include the Gambhir and the Kanh, both tributaries of the Kshipra river.

=== Cities and towns ===
Indore is the administrative centre and main city in the district. Dr. Ambedkar Nagar (Mhow) is an important cantonment town in the Indore District that contains three of the Indian Army's premier training institutes, as well as the Border Security Force's Central School of Weapons and Tactics (CSWT). Other towns in Indore include Depalpur, Sanwer and Hatod.

The municipalities of Indore district are listed as follows:

- Indore
- Betma
- Depalpur
- Goutampura
- Hatod
- Manpur
- Mhowgaon
- Rau
- Sanwer

=== Villages ===
- Mothala

== Divisions ==
=== Tehsils ===
The Indore district has 10 administrative divisions (tehsils) :

- Bicholi Hapsi
- Depalpur
- Dr. Ambedkar Nagar
- Hatod
- Juni Indore
- Kanadia
- Khudel
- Malharganj
- Rau
- Sanwer

=== Blocks ===
There are also four blocks in the district, with 51 police stations.

- Indore
- Dr. Ambedkar Nagar
- Sanwer
- Depalpur

There are a total of 335 Panchayats and 649 villages in the four blocks.

== Politics ==
On June 4, 2024, Shri.Shankar Lalwani of Bharatiya Janata Party has been re-elected as the Member of Parliament from Indore constituency, with the highest national margin.[8]

In May 2019, Shankar Lalwani of Bharatiya Janata Party had been elected as the Member of Parliament from Indore constituency.

The previous member of the Lok Sabha from the Indore constituency was Sumitra Mahajan of the Bharatiya Janata Party (BJP). She was a Member of Parliament from 1989 to May 2019.

Since parliamentary and legislative assembly constituency boundaries were redrawn in 2008, there have been nine Vidhan Sabha constituencies in this district: Depalpur, Indore-1, Indore-2, Indore-3, Indore-4, Indore-5, Dr. Ambedkar Nagar-Mhow, Rau and Sanwer. Dr. Ambedkar Nagar-Mhow is part of the Dhar Lok Sabha constituency and the others are part of the Indore Lok Sabha constituency.

== Electricity ==
The electricity in Indore district is distributed by Madhya Pradesh Paschim Kshetra Vidyut Vitaran Company Limited.

== Demographics ==
Historical population
| Year | Pop. | ±% p.a. |
|---|---|---|
| 1901 | 302,057 | — |
| 1911 | 272,396 | −1.03% |
| 1921 | 338,992 | +2.21% |
| 1931 | 380,889 | +1.17% |
| 1941 | 454,541 | +1.78% |
| 1951 | 601,035 | +2.83% |
| 1961 | 753,594 | +2.29% |
| 1971 | 1,025,150 | +3.13% |
| 1981 | 1,409,473 | +3.23% |
| 1991 | 1,835,915 | +2.68% |
| 2001 | 2,465,827 | +2.99% |
| 2011 | 3,276,697 | +2.88% |

Religions in Indore district (2011)
| Religion | Percent |
| Hinduism | 83.26% |
| Islam | 12.67% |
| Jainism | 2.19% |
| Sikhism | 0.78% |
| Christianity | 0.56% |
| Other or not stated | 0.54% |

According to the 2011 census, the Indore District has a population of 3,276,697, which roughly equals the nation of Mauritania or the US state of Iowa. This makes it the 105th most populous in India (out of a total of 640) districts. The district has a population density of 841 inhabitants per square kilometre (2,180/sq mi). Its population growth rate over the decade 2001-2011 was 32.88%. Indore has a sex ratio of 928 females for every 1,000 males, and a literacy rate of 80.87% (male 87.25% and female 74.02%). 74.09% of the population lives in urban areas. Scheduled Castes and Scheduled Tribes make up 16.64% and 6.64% of the population respectively.

Languages of Indore district (2011)
1. Hindi (71.4%)
2. Malvi (15.1%)
3. Marathi (3.54%)
4. Urdu (2.81%)
5. Sindhi (1.74%)
6. Nimadi (1.39%)
7. Gujarati (0.98%)
8. Others (3.10%)

At the time of the 2011 Census of India, 71.39% of the population in the district spoke Hindi, 15.05% Malvi, 3.54% Marathi, 2.81% Urdu, 1.74% Sindhi, 1.39% Nimadi, 0.98% Gujarati, 0.81% Punjabi and 0.49% Bhili as their first language.

== Climate ==
Climate data for Indore district
| Month | Jan | Feb | Mar | Apr | May | Jun | Jul | Aug | Sep | Oct | Nov | Dec | Year |
|---|---|---|---|---|---|---|---|---|---|---|---|---|---|
| Mean daily maximum °C (°F) | 27.5 (81.5) | 28.8 (83.8) | 38.3 (100.9) | 42.7 (108.9) | 46.4 (115.5) | 36.2 (97.2) | 30.3 (86.5) | 28.2 (82.8) | 30.9 (87.6) | 32.4 (90.3) | 22.7 (72.9) | 16.9 (62.4) | 31.8 (89.2) |
| Mean daily minimum °C (°F) | 5.8 (42.4) | 9.4 (48.9) | 16.2 (61.2) | 21.2 (70.2) | 24.4 (75.9) | 24.1 (75.4) | 22.6 (72.7) | 21.9 (71.4) | 21.1 (70.0) | 18.1 (64.6) | 11.9 (53.4) | 6.6 (43.9) | 16.9 (62.5) |
| Average precipitation mm (inches) | 4 (0.2) | 3 (0.1) | 1 (0.0) | 3 (0.1) | 11 (0.4) | 136 (5.4) | 279 (11.0) | 360 (14.2) | 185 (7.3) | 52 (2.0) | 21 (0.8) | 7 (0.3) | 1,062 (41.8) |
| Average precipitation days | 0.8 | 0.8 | 0.3 | 0.3 | 1.8 | 8.6 | 15.9 | 18.3 | 8.6 | 3.1 | 1.4 | 0.6 | 60.5 |
| Mean monthly sunshine hours | 288.3 | 274.4 | 288.3 | 306.0 | 325.5 | 210.0 | 105.4 | 80.6 | 180.0 | 269.7 | 273.0 | 282.1 | 2,883.3 |
Source: HKO

== Tourism ==
Indore district has the variety of tourist spots, historical spots and natural spots for the purpose of tourism. Indore city has palaces of the erstwhile Holkar rulers.

== Tourist places ==
- Dr. Babasaheb Ambedkar, Birth Place

=== Historical places ===
- Rajwada - Also known as the Holkar Palace, Rajwada is a seven-story palace in the heart of Indore. It was built in the 18th century by the Holkar dynasty and is an example of the fusion of Maratha, Mughal, and French architecture.
- Lal Bagh Palace - Lal Bagh Palace is another palace built by the Holkar dynasty, located on the outskirts of Indore. It was built in the 19th century and is now a museum that houses the Holkar family's belongings, including paintings, weapons, and furniture.
- Annapurna Temple - The Annapurna Temple is dedicated to the Hindu goddess of food and nourishment, Annapurna. It is located in the heart of Indore and is known for its stunning architecture and intricate carvings.
- Khajrana Ganesh Temple - The Khajrana Ganesh Temple is one of the most popular temples in Indore, dedicated to Lord Ganesha, the elephant-headed god of wisdom and prosperity. It is believed to be one of the oldest temples in the city and is visited by thousands of devotees every day.
- Kanch Mandir - Kanch Mandir, also known as the Glass Temple, is a Jain temple in Indore that is entirely made of glass. It was built in the early 20th century and is known for its intricate glasswork and stunning architecture.
- Jam Gate – Jam Gate is a historic gateway located near Mhow on the Indore–Mandleshwar Road. It is known for its historical significance and panoramic views.
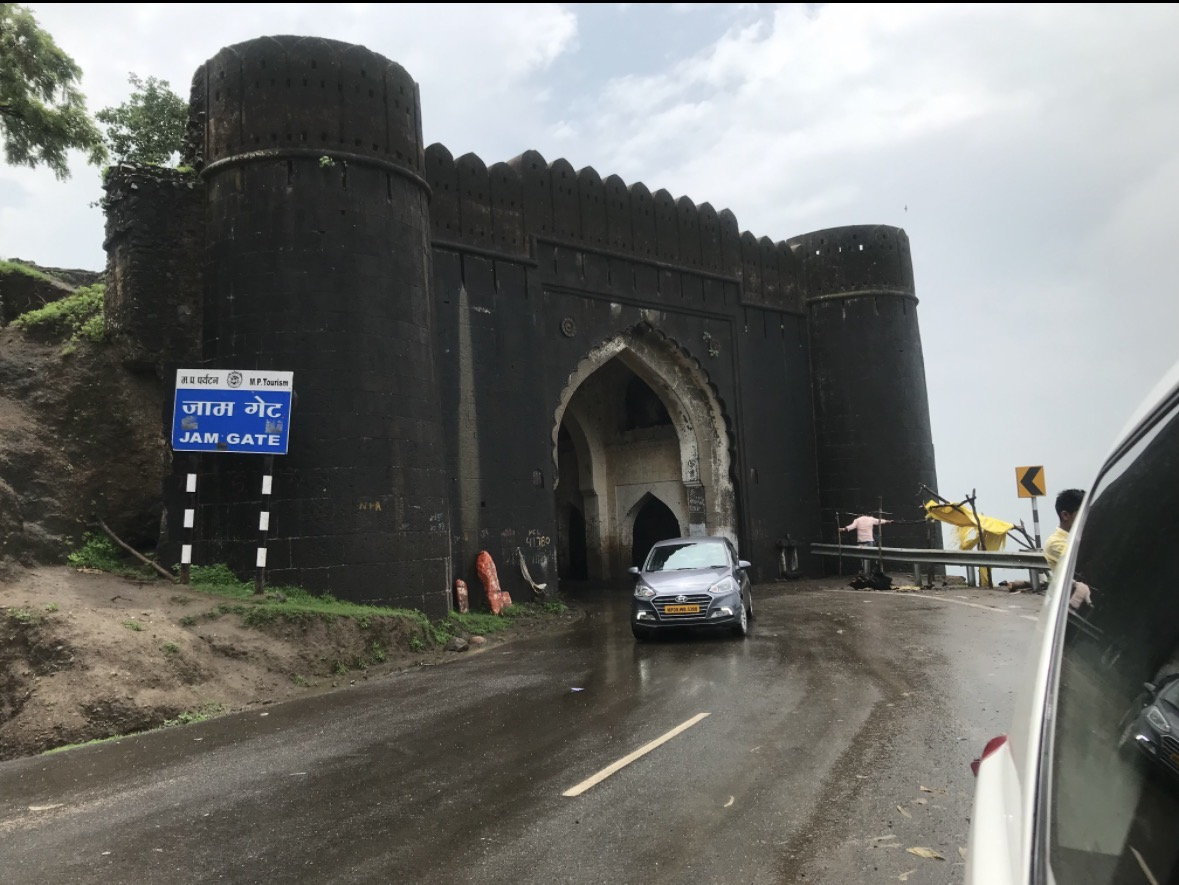
  Jam Gate near Mhow, Indore district, Madhya Pradesh

=== Natural wonders ===
- Patalpani Waterfall - Patalpani Waterfall is a stunning waterfall located on the outskirts of Indore. It is one of the highest waterfalls in Madhya Pradesh, with water cascading down from a height of 300 feet. The surrounding area is covered with lush green forests, making it a popular spot for picnics and treks.
- Tincha Falls - Tincha Falls is another waterfall located near Indore, surrounded by dense forests and hills. It is a picturesque spot for nature lovers and adventure enthusiasts, offering activities like trekking, rappelling, and rock climbing.
- Ralamandal Wildlife Sanctuary - Ralamandal Wildlife Sanctuary is a lush green forest located in the outskirts of Indore. It is home to several species of flora and fauna, including the Indian leopard, sambar deer, wild boar, and Indian giant squirrel. Visitors can enjoy trekking, bird watching, and nature walks in the sanctuary.
- Mandu - Mandu is a historical town located in the Dhar district of Madhya Pradesh. It is surrounded by forests and hills and is home to several ancient ruins, including the Jahaz Mahal, Hindola Mahal, and the Baz Bahadur Palace.
- Choral Dam - Choral Dam is located near Indore. The surrounding area is covered with lush green forests and hills, making it an ideal spot for picnics and water sports like boating and fishing.
