= Dr. Ambedkar Nagar–Sanawad Passenger =

Train in India

Dr. Ambedkar Nagar - Omkareshwar Road Passenger
Overview
- Service type: MG Passenger
- Locale: Madhya Pradesh
- First service: 1 December 1874; 151 years ago
- Last service: 30 January 2023; 3 years ago
- Current operator: Western Railways

Route
- Termini: Dr. Ambedkar Nagar (DADN); Omkareshwar Road (OM)
- Stops: 7
- Distance travelled: 64 km (40 mi)
- Average journey time: 09174 - 2 Hours 20 Minutes; 09175 - 2 Hours 10 Minutes
- Service frequency: Daily
- Train number: 09174/09175

On-board services
- Class: Unreserved
- Seating arrangements: Yes
- Sleeping arrangements: No
- Catering facilities: No
- Baggage facilities: Available

Technical
- Rolling stock: MG ICF Coach
- Track gauge: 1,000 mm (3 ft 3 3/8 in) metre gauge
- Operating speed: 26 km/h (16 mph) average with halts

Dr. Ambedkar Nagar - Omkareshwar Road Passenger was a metre-gauge passenger train of the Indian Railways, which was running between Dr. Ambedkar Nagar in Madhya Pradesh and Omkareshwar Road in Madhya Pradesh. It has been closed down since 30 January 2023 as the track between the two stations is being converted to Broad Gauge.

The last train on the 150-year-old metre gauge rail line associated with the heritage railways in western Madhya Pradesh was flagged off on 30 January 2023 as authorities halted train movement on the stretch indefinitely to facilitate its conversion into broad gauge, an official said.

This was the last surviving metre-gauge train of the Akola–Ratlam line in Madhya Pradesh. After undergoing gauge conversion, it will provide connectivity between Indore and Southern Indian states.

== Route and halts ==
The important halts of the train are:

- Dr. Ambedkar Nagar
- Patalpani
- Kalakund
- Choral
- Mukhtiara Balwada
- Barwaha
- Omkareshwar Road
- Sanawad

== Average speed and frequency ==
The Dr. Ambedkar Nagar - Sanawad Passenger runs with an average speed of 29 km/h and completes 64 km in 2h 30m. The Sanawad - Dr. Ambedkar Nagar Passenger runs with an average speed of 29 km/h and completes 64 km in 2h 30m.

== Coach composite ==
The train consists of 4 coaches:

- 4 General
- 2 Guard cum Luggage/parcel van

== Traction ==
Both trains are hauled by a Mhow Loco Shed based YDM-4 diesel locomotive from Dr. Ambedkar Nagar to Omkareshwar Road and vice versa. Banker locomotive is attached from Kalakund to Patalpani due to steep incline .

== See also ==
- Dr. Ambedkar Nagar railway station
- Sanawad railway station
- Mhow Indore Passenger
- Akola–Ratlam rail line
