= Khandwa–Sanawad Special =

Train in India

Khandwa-Sanawad Special
Overview
- Service type: Passenger
- Locale: Madhya Pradesh
- First service: 2024
- Current operator(s): Central Railway

Route
- Termini: Khandwa Junction; Sanawad
- Stops: 6
- Distance travelled: 54 km (34 mi)
- Average journey time: 1h 30m
- Service frequency: Sat, Mon, Tue, Fri, Sun

On-board services
- Seating arrangements: Yes
- Sleeping arrangements: No
- Catering facilities: No
- Entertainment facilities: No
- Baggage facilities: Yes

Technical
- Track gauge: BG
- Operating speed: 36 km/h (22 mph) average with halts

Khandwa–Sanawad Special is a passenger train of the Indian Railways, which runs between Khandwa and Sanawad towns of Madhya Pradesh. The inaugural run was on 12 March 2024.

== Arrival and departure ==
- Train no. 01091 departs from Khandwa at 09:00 AM, reaching Sanawad the same day at 10:30 AM.
- Train no. 01092 departs from Sanawad at 02:45 PM, reaching Khandwa the same day at 04:10 PM.

== Route and halts ==
The important halts of the train are:

- Khandwa Junction
- Ajanti
- Attar
- Kotla Kheri
- Nimar Kheri
- Sanawad

== Average speed and frequency ==
The train runs with an average speed of 36 km/h and completes 54 km in 1 hours 30 minutes. The train runs on all days of the week except Wednesdays & Thursdays.
