= Indore–Dr. Ambedkar Nagar DEMU =

Overview
- Service type: MEMU
- Locale: Madhya Pradesh
- First service: 28 January 2016; 9 years ago
- Current operator: Western Railway

Route
- Termini: Indore Junction (INDB); Dr. Ambedkar Nagar (DADN)
- Stops: 12
- Service frequency: Daily
- Train numbers: 79313UP / 79314DN; 79315UP / 79316DN; 79317UP / 79318DN; 79319UP / 79320DN; 79321UP / 79322DN; 79323UP / 79324DN

On-board services
- Classes: First class, sleeper 3 tier, unreserved
- Seating arrangements: Yes
- Sleeping arrangements: Yes
- Catering facilities: No
- Entertainment facilities: No
- Baggage facilities: No

Technical
- Track gauge: 5 ft 6 in (1,676 mm)

Indore–Dr. Ambedkar Nagar DEMU is a passenger train of the Indian Railways, which runs between Dr. Ambedkar Nagar railway station and Indore Junction, both within Madhya Pradesh.

== Route and halts ==
The important halts of the train are:

- Dr. Ambedkar Nagar
- Haranya Kheri
- Rau
- Rajendra Nagar
- Lokmanya Nagar
- Saifee Nagar
- Indore Junction
