= Mhow–Indore Passenger =

Train in India

Mhow Indore Passenger was a passenger train of Indian Railways, which ran between Indore Junction railway station (MG) to Mhow railway station in the Central Indian state of Madhya Pradesh. In 2015, the train was cancelled due to closure of Indore - Mhow line for Gauge Conversion.

== Arrival and departure ==
Train no. 52962 departed from Mhow, daily at 03:50 hrs., reaching Indore the same day at 04:40 hrs. Train no. 52979 departed from Indore daily at 22:05 hrs reaching Mhow the same day at 23:00 hrs. The train covered the 21-kilometer journey in 50 minutes with an average speed of 25 km/h.

== Route and halts ==
The train ran via Dewas and Ujjain. The important halts of the train were:

- Indore Junction
- Saifi Nagar railway station
- Lokmanya Nagar railway station
- Rajendra Nagar railway station
- Rau railway station
- Haranya Kheri railway station
- Mhow railway station

== Coach composite ==
The train consisted of 9 coaches :

- 9 unreserved coach
- 2 luggage/brake van coach
- 1 sleeper coach
