= Tihi =

- Village
- Location in Madhya Pradesh, India Tihi (India)
- Coordinates: 22°34′29.229″N 75°44′40.0302″E
- Country: India
- State: Madhya Pradesh
- Region: Malwa
- District: Indore
- Tehsil: Mhow

Government
  - Type: Council

Area
  - Total: 5.75 km^{2} (2.22 sq mi)
- Elevation: 572 m (1,877 ft)

Population (2011)
  - Total: 1,984
  - Density: 345/km^{2} (894/sq mi)
- Time zone: UTC+5:30 (IST)
- PIN: 453441
- Telephone code: 07324
- Vehicle registration: MP-09-XX-XXXX

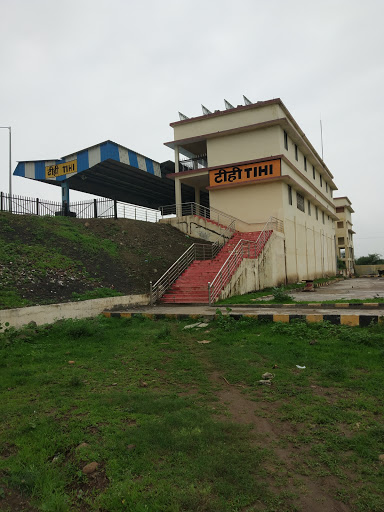
Tihi Railway Station

Tihi or Teehe is a Gram Panchayat under sub-division Dr. Ambedkar Nagar (Mhow) in Indore district in the Indian state of Madhya Pradesh. Total geographical area of Tihi gram panchayat is 5.75 km^{2} (574.74 hectares). Mhowgaon is nearest town to Tihi which is approximately 8 km away.

== Connectivity ==
The village is connected via road and nearest Town is Mhowgaon. There is no railway connectivity to the town. The nearest railway is station Mhow railway station which is 9 km away from the village. The nearest airport from the town is Indores Devi Ahilya Bai Holkar Airport, which is approximately 20 km away from the village.

== Demographics ==
Tihi has a total population of 1,984 peoples and there are about 349 houses in village. 1,035 Males constitute 52.17% of the population and 949 females 47.83% (from 46% in 2001).Population of Children with age of 0–6 is 251 which is 12.65% of total population.

== Climate ==
Tihi has a borderline humid subtropical climate (Köppen climate classification Cwa) and tropical savanna climate (Aw). Three distinct seasons are observed: summer, monsoon and winter.

Summers start in mid-March and can be extremely hot in April and May. The daytime temperatures can touch 48 °C (118 °F) on more than one occasion. Average summer temperatures may go as high as 40 °C (104 °F) but humidity is very low.

Winters are moderate and usually dry. Lower temperatures can go as low as 2 °C (36 °F)-6 °C (43 °F) on some nights. Usually the temperature ranges between 8 and 26 °C during winters.

Rains are due to southwest monsoons. The typical monsoon season goes from 15 June till mid-September, contributing 32–35 inches of annual rains. 95% of rains occur during monsoon season.

Tihi gets moderate rainfall of 185 to 360 millimetres (7.3 to 14.2 in) during July–September due to the southwest monsoon.

Source: NOAA

== See also ==
- Tihi railway station
