= Patalpani =

Patalpani may refer to:

- Patalpani, Bhopal, a village in Bhopal district of Madhya Pradesh, India
- Patalpani railway station, a railway station in Indore district of Madhya Pradesh, India
- Patalpani waterfall in Indore district of Madhya Pradesh, India
