= Choral railway station =

Railway station in Madhya Pradesh, India

Coordinates: 22.4498°N 75.9453°E

General information
- Location: Choral, Indore district, Madhya Pradesh; India
- Elevation: 343 metres (1,125 ft)
- System: Indian Railways station
- Owner: Indian Railways
- Operator: Western Railway
- Line: Akola–Ratlam line
- Platforms: 1
- Tracks: 4

Construction
- Structure type: Standard (on-ground station)
- Parking: No
- Cycle facilities: No

Other information
- Status: Construction – gauge conversion
- Station code: CRL
- Zone(s): Western Railway
- Division(s): Ratlam

Services
Preceding station	Indian Railways	Following station
Mukhtiara Balwada towards ?	Western Railway zone Akola–Ratlam line	Kalakund towards ?
Location
- Interactive map

Choral railway station is a small railway station in Indore district, Madhya Pradesh. Its code is CRL. It serves Choral town. The station consists of one platform. The platform is not well sheltered. It lacks many facilities including water and sanitation. Recently gauge conversion started on this line. After conversion it will connect Indore to South India.

== Connectivity ==
The station is connected with Dr. Ambedkar Nagar Railway Station (MHOW) to the north west and Sanawad to the south-east on the Dr. Ambedkar Nagar (MHOW) - Sanawad Meter Gauge Railline.

The station is well-connected to Indore Jn. via Dr. Ambedkar Nagar, MHOW.

== Electrification ==
At present, the station is on non-electrified rail route.

== Developments ==
The conversion of Dr. Ambedkar Nagar Railway Station (MHOW) to Sanawad (meter-gauge) to (broad-gauge) rail line is in progress. Upon completion, It would directly connect Indore to Mumbai.
