= Patalpur =

Patalpur may refer to:

- Patalpur (census code 482201), a village in Berasia tehsil of Bhopal district, Madhya Pradesh, India; located along the Madhya Pradesh State Highway 23, just north of the Berasia town
- Patalpur (census code 482334), a village in Berasia tehsil of Bhopal district, Madhya Pradesh, India; located near Keetai Dewapura and Patalpani
