= Mukhtiara Balwada railway station =

Railway station in Madhya Pradesh

General information
- Location: Mukhtiara Balwada, Khargone district, Madhya Pradesh; India
- Coordinates: 22.3854°N 75.9780°E
- Elevation: 266 metres (873 ft)
- System: Indian Railways station
- Owner: Indian Railways
- Operator: Western Railway
- Line: Akola–Ratlam rail line
- Platforms: 1
- Tracks: 2

Construction
- Structure type: Standard (on-ground station)
- Parking: No
- Cycle facilities: No

Other information
- Status: Active
- Station code: MKT
- Zone(s): Western Railway
- Division(s): Ratlam

History
- Electrified: Ongoing

Services
Preceding station	Indian Railways	Following station
Barwaha towards ?	Western Railway zone Akola–Ratlam rail line	Choral towards ?
Location
- Interactive map

Mukhtiara Balwada railway station is a small railway station in Khargone district, Madhya Pradesh. Its code is MKT. It serves Mukhtiara Balwada town. The station consists of one platform. The platform is not well sheltered. It lacks many facilities including water and sanitation. Recently gauge conversion started on this line. After conversion it will connect Indore to South India.

== Connectivity ==
The station is connected with Dr. Ambedkar Nagar Railway Station (MHOW) to the north west and Sanawad to the south-east on the Dr. Ambedkar Nagar (MHOW) - Sanawad Meter Gauge Railline.

The station is well-connected to Indore Jn. via Dr. Ambedkar Nagar, MHOW.

== Electrification ==
At present, the station is on non-electrified rail route.

== Developments ==
The conversion of Dr. Ambedkar Nagar Railway Station (MHOW) to Sanawad (meter-gauge) to (broad-gauge) rail line is in progress. Upon completion, It would directly connect Indore to Mumbai.
