= Indore–Dahod line =

Railway line in India

Overview
- Status: Partially Operational
- Owner: Indian Railway
- Locale: Madhya Pradesh & Gujarat
- Termini: Indore Junction; Dahod
- Stations: 9

Service
- System: Western Railway
- Operator: Western Railway (WR)
- Depot: Indore Junction

Technical
- Track length: 204.76 km (127 mi)
- Number of tracks: 2
- Character: At Grade
- Track gauge: 5 ft 6 in (1,676 mm) broad gauge
- Electrification: Yes
- Operating speed: 100 km/h (62 mph)

The Indore - Dahod railway line of the Western Railway Zone is an under construction public transit system in the state of Madhya Pradesh and Gujarat. It will connect Indore with Dahod on Mathura–Vadodara section. This line will reduce the distance between Indore and Dahod by 100 km.

== History ==
The Project, approved in 2008 had 8 tunnels in the original design which was later revised to 3 tunnels, The project is likely to exceed the original cost of Rs 1643 crores. and work started in 2012.

== Route and halts ==
Indore–Dahod line
#	Station Name	Station Code	Connections
1	Indore Junction	INDB	Indore–Gwalior line
2	Saifee Nagar	SFNR	None
3	Lokmanya Nagar	LKMN	None
4	Rajendra Nagar	RJQ	None
5	Rau	RAU	Akola–Ratlam line
5	Tihi	TIHI	None
6	Pithampur	PTMPR	None
7	Sagore	SAGOR	None
8	Gunawad	GUNWD	None
9	Dhar	DHAR	Chhota Udaipur–Dhar line
10	Sardarpur	SRDPR	None
11	Jhabua	JHBUA	None
12	Pitol	PITOL	None
13	Katwara	KTWRA	None
14	Dahod	DHD	Mathura–Vadodara section

== Present status ==
- 2026 Mar: Out of 204.76 km Indore–Dahod new rail line project, 32.30 km is already operational (21 km Indore–Tihi and 11.30 km Katwara-Dahod sections), the remaining Tihi tunnel (likley completion by June 2026) and Tihi-Katwara sections (Jhabua-Katwara by April-June 2026) are under construction with the revised overall target project completion date of 28 February 2027.

== See also ==
- Future of rail transport in India
  - Bhopal-Ramganj Mandi line, under-construction with target completion by December 2027, will provide shorter route from Ludiana-Hisar-Jaipur-Kota to Bhopal
  - Manmad–Indore line, target completion date of 2028-29.
  - Chhota Udaipur–Dhar line, target completion date of 2027.
  - Wardha–Nanded line, under-construction via Yavatmal-Pusad target completion by 2027-28, will provide shorter route from North India to Pusad-Nanded.
- Existing
  - Mathura–Vadodara section
  - Chhota Udaipur–Dhar line
