= Bhatkhedi =

- Village
- Location in Madhya Pradesh, India
- Coordinates: 22°35′47.39064″N 75°42′42.12468″E
- Country: India
- State: Madhya Pradesh
- Region: Malwa
- District: Indore
- Tehsil: Mhow

Government
  - Type: Council

Area
  - Total: 9 km^{2} (3.5 sq mi)
- Elevation: 572 m (1,877 ft)

Population (2011)
  - Total: 4,366
  - Density: 490/km^{2} (1,300/sq mi)
- Time zone: UTC+5:30 (IST)
- PIN: 453441
- Telephone code: 07324
- Vehicle registration: MP-09-XX-XXXX

Bhatkhedi is a Gram Panchayat under sub-division Dr. Ambedkar Nagar (Mhow) in Indore district in the Indian state of Madhya Pradesh. Total geographical area of Bhatkhedi gram panchayat is 9 km^{2} (900 hectares). Mhowgaon is nearest town to Bhatkhedi which is approximately 7 km away.

== Connectivity ==
The village is connected via road and nearest town is Mhowgaon. There is no railway connectivity to the town. The nearest railway is station Mhow railway station which is 11 km away from the village. The nearest airport from the town is Indores Devi Ahilya Bai Holkar Airport, which is approximately 25 km away from the village.

== Demographics ==
Bhatkhedi is the 9th most populous village in Dr. Ambedkar Nagar (Mhow) with a total population of 4,366 people. 2,267 Males constitute 51.92% of the population and 2,099 females 48.08%. Population of Children with age of 0-6 is 17%, among them 51% are boys and 49% are girls. There are 830 households in the village and an average 5 persons live in every family.

== Climate ==
Bhatkhedi has a borderline humid subtropical climate (Köppen climate classification Cwa) and tropical savanna climate (Aw). Three distinct seasons are observed: summer, monsoon and winter.

Summers start in mid-March and can be extremely hot in April and May. The daytime temperatures can touch 48 °C (118 °F) on more than one occasion. Average summer temperatures may go as high as 40 °C (104 °F) but humidity is very low.

Winters are moderate and usually dry. Lower temperatures can go as low as 2 °C (36 °F)-6 °C (43 °F) on some nights. Usually the temperature ranges between 8 and 26 °C during winters.

Rains are due to southwest monsoons. The typical monsoon season goes from 15 June till mid-September, contributing 32–35 inches of annual rains. 95% of rains occur during monsoon season.

Bhatkhedi gets moderate rainfall of 185 to 360 millimetres (7.3 to 14.2 in) during July–September due to the southwest monsoon.

Source: NOAA

== Tourist attractions ==
Bhatkhedi has following tourist attractions

- Neelkanth Temple
- Hindola Mahal
- Jahaj Mahal
- Janapav
- Kharbuja Mahal
- Jain Dharmshala

== See also ==
- Mhowgaon
