= Hyderabad–Jaipur Meenakshi Express =

Train in India

Jaipur–Hyderabad Meenakshi Express

Overview
- Service type: Express
- First service: September 2012; 13 years ago
- Current operator: South Central Railway

Route
- Termini: Jaipur; Hyderabad
- Stops: 20
- Distance travelled: 1,849 km (1,149 mi)
- Average journey time: 16 hours 00 minutes
- Service frequency: Bi-weekly
- Train number: 12719 / 12720

On-board services
- Classes: AC 2 Tier, AC 3 Tier, Sleeper Class, General Unreserved
- Seating arrangements: Yes
- Sleeping arrangements: Yes
- Catering facilities: Available
- Observation facilities: Large windows
- Baggage facilities: No
- Other facilities: Below the seats

Technical
- Rolling stock: LHB coach
- Track gauge: 1,676 mm (5 ft 6 in)
- Operating speed: 49 km/h (30 mph) average including halts.
Route map
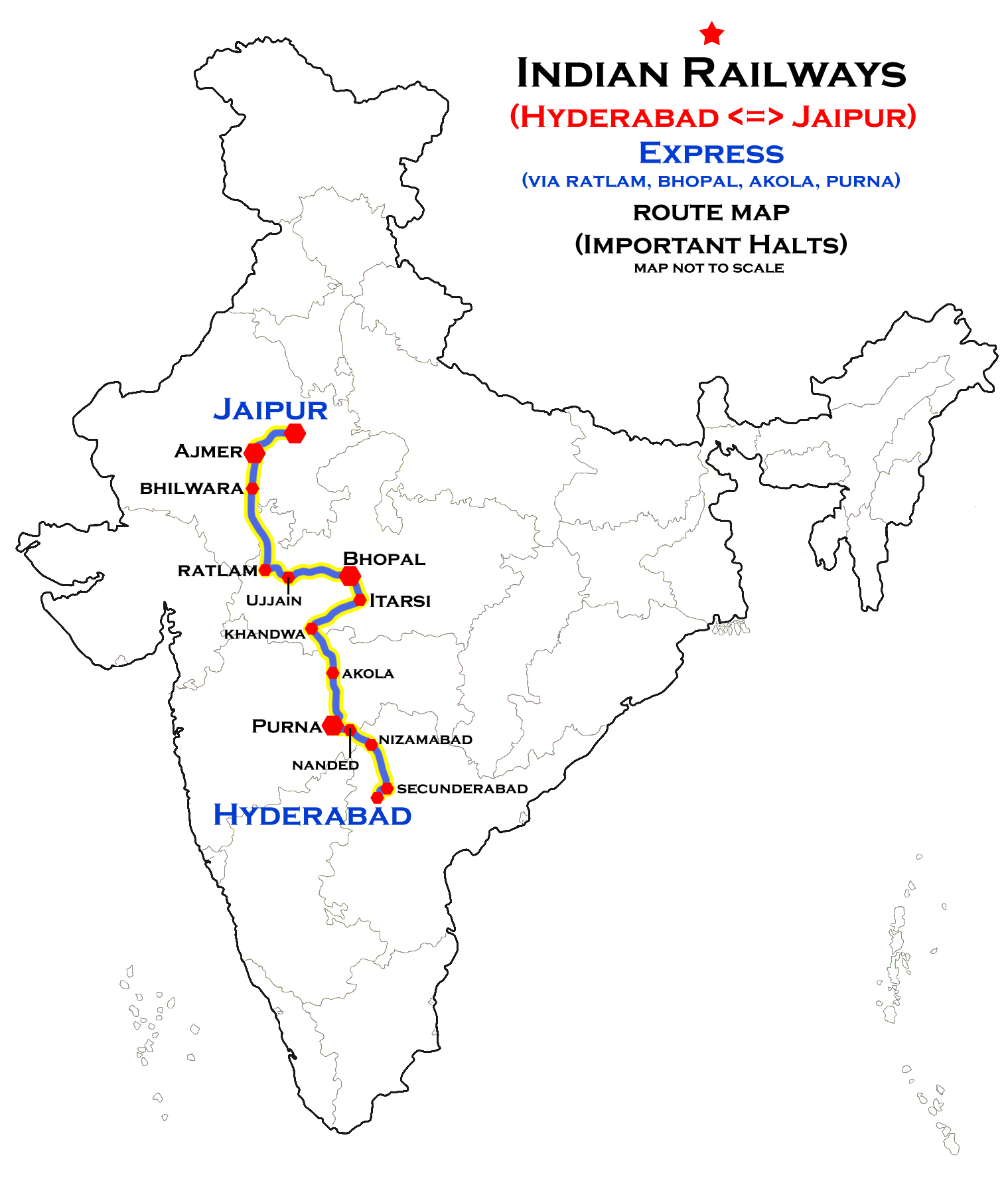

The 12720 / 12719 Hyderabad -Jaipur Express is a train started by Indian Railways in September 2012. It connects Ajmer in Rajasthan with Hyderabad the capital of Telangana. It replaced a train called Meenakshi Express that used to run from Jaipur to Kacheguda near Secunderabad on metre gauge but was cancelled when the track was being converted to 5 ft 6 in (1,676 mm) broad gauge.

== Nomenclature ==
The train is unofficially called by the name of its earlier avatar Meenakshi Express. At Hyderabad it is simply called Ajmer Express and at Ajmer it is simply called Hyderabad Express. An earlier train Nagarjuna Express that ran between Tenali and Secunderabad and was terminated in the middle of 2007 had the train numbers but ran on a completely different route.

== Schedule ==
The train runs twice a week. Train number 12720 departs every Monday and Wednesday at 20:25 hours. from Hyderabad (station code HYB) and at 20.55 hours from Secunderabad and reaches Jaipur (station code JP) after 33 hours at 05.25 hours. on Wednesday and Friday respectively. In the return direction, train number 12719 departs Jaipur every Wednesday and Friday at 15.20 hours. and reaches Hyderabad at 00.45 hours after 33 hours. The distance is 1,849 km (1,149 mi).

== Route ==
The train stops at Nizamabad, Mudkhed, Nanded, Purna, Hingoli, Washim, Akola, Burhanpur, Khandwa, Itarsi, Bhopal, Ujjain, Ratlam, Neemuch, Mandsaur, Chittorgarh, Bhilwara, Ajmer & Phulera en route.

When the metre gauge track between Akola and Khandwa passing through Satpura mountains & Khandwa-Indore section are converted to broad gauge, the distance will shorten to 1,573 km (977 mi)and the time taken by the train will be reduced to 29 hours & the train will take the original route of Meenakshi Express.

== Rake composition ==
The train has one AC 2 tier, two AC 3 tier, seven sleeper, six unreserved second and two luggage-cum-brake van coaches with no pantry car but its run with LHB rake from 2 July 2017, now it has one AC 2 tier, nine AC 3 tier, seven sleeper class, two general unreserved coaches and two generator car cum luggage van.

== Loco link ==
The train uses to be led by Lallaguda/Vijayawada Shed based WAP 7 Locomotive from Hyderabad in both directions. The train reverses direction at Purna and Ratlam with stoppage of 20 mins in both stations.

== History ==
Delhi-Jaipur-Ahmedabad Line was laid in Broad Gauge up till Marwar bypassing Ajmer via Madar. But Malwa-Rajputhana Railways did blunder & laid Udaipur-Chanderiya-Gurla as a Metre Gauge. Thus by 1873, the British had to convert BG line from Delhi to Marwar as a Metre Gauge with addition of Ajmer station. Jaipur – Madar – Ratlam – Indore was fully laid in Broad Gauge via Chittorgarh & Nimach up till Chandrawatiganj. Again Malwa-Rajputhana Railways did blunder & laid Ujjain – Chandrawatiganj – Indore in Metre Gauge & further completed the line till Khandwa. A parallel Broad Gauge line from Omkareswar to Khandwa was laid by British along with Akola-Purna Broad Gauge line in 1890–1895 AD. But Nizam Guaranteed Railways had laid the Ajanta Line from Hyderabad to Manmad in Metre Gauge by 1895 AD. Keeping the request of Nizam, the British converted Madar – Chittorgarh – Ratlam – Chandrawatiganj & Akola – Hingoli – Purna Broad Gauge line as a Metre Gauge in 1900 AD. Thus the 1,349 km (838 mi) long Ajmer – Chittorgarh – Ratlam/Ujjain – Chandrawatiganj – Indore – Mhow – Barwaha – Khandwa – Akola – Purna – Nanded – Kacheguda Meter Gauge Line came into existence. The parallel Broad Gauge line from Barwaha to Khandwa was scrapped in 1901 & the Nizam Guaranteed Railways started Meenakshi Express on the metre-gauge track to link the Hyderabad-Godavari Valley Railways and Malwa-Rajputhana Railways. The Khandwa–Akola metre gauge was opened in 1963 but even then no direct service was between Ajmer and Hyderabad. In 1976 railway minister Shri Kamlapat Tripathi announce amalgamation of 69/70 Ajmer-Khandwa and 581/582 Khandwa-Kacheguda passenger. Then Ajmer-Kachiguda passenger was longest 1,326 km (824 mi) Metre Gauge Passenger train in the country. The train used to run every day to Ajmer via Nizamabad, Nanded, Purna, Akola, Khandwa, Indore MG, Ratlam, Neemuch, Mandsaur and Chittorgarh. In October 1977 railway minister Shri Madhu Dandvate started 69/70 bi-weekly Ajmer-kacheguda express later on Shri Madhavrao Scindia increase the frequency 2-5-7 and extended to Jaipur. Though the train does not go to Ujjain, it stops at Fatehabad junction which is about 22.80 km (14.17 mi) each from Ujjain. This train was unofficially called Meenaxi express as it was proposed to extend to Madurai where famous MEENAXI temple is there, but it was never done and the train was discontinued in phase manner due to gauge conversion.

It was named Minakshi possibly because

1. The Mahur Ekvira or Ekaveera Aayee, of Nanded district, which is the most adorable goddess of Marathi people and people living around Nizamabad and Adilabad districts, is also known Minakshi aayee.
2. Mahakali goddess of Ujjain, which is also adored as Minakshi.

Many Muslims of Hyderabad travel by the train for ziyarat to the dargah of Gharīb Nawāz Khwaja Moinuddin Chisti Sharif in Ajmer. Pushkar is a Hindu sacred place near Ajmer.

Also there are many Hindus of Hyderabad who travels to Pushkar, a sacred place for Hindus.

== Another train with similar name ==
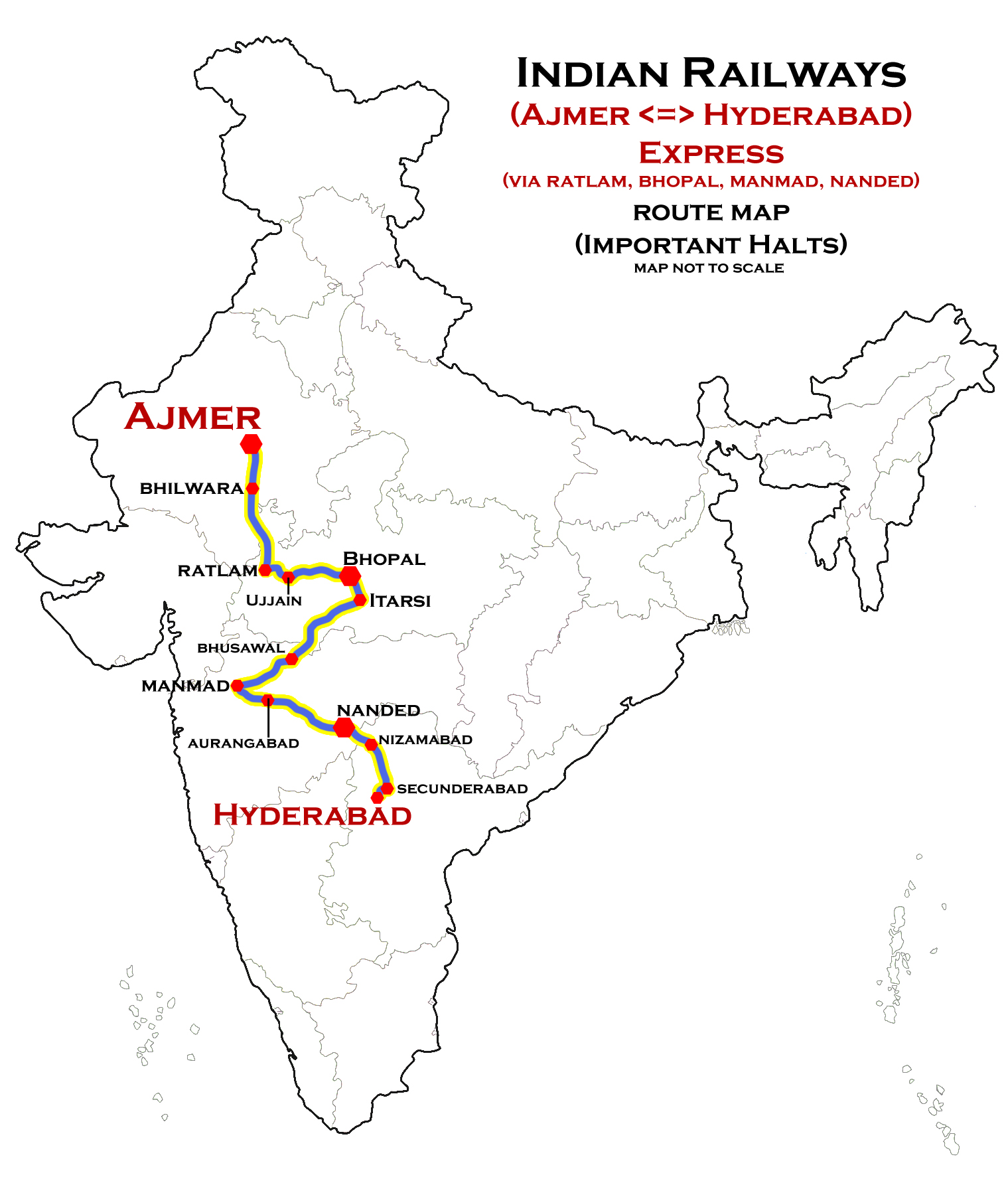
(Ajmer – Hyderabad) Express (via Manmad) Route map

Hyderabad-Ajmer Express (train numbers 17019 and 17020) is another train that runs between Hyderabad and Ajmer once a week. From Purna it goes to Manmad and then Itarsi. Therefore, the distance is longer at 2,025 km (1,258 mi) and the time taken is 37 hours 30 minutes .
