= Patalpur (census code 482334) =

- village
- Location within Madhya Pradesh Location within India
- Coordinates: 23.8260224°N 77.3378706°E
- Country: India
- State: Madhya Pradesh
- District: Bhopal
- Tehsil: Berasia
- Elevation: 476 m (1,562 ft)

Population (2011)
  - Total: 409
- Time zone: UTC+5:30 (IST)
- ISO 3166 code: IN-MP
- 2011 census code: 482334

Patalpur is a village in the Bhopal district of Madhya Pradesh, India. It is located in the Berasia tehsil, near Keetai Dewapura and Patalpani.

== Demographics ==
According to the 2011 census of India, Patalpur has 77 households. The effective literacy rate (i.e. the literacy rate of population excluding children aged 6 and below) is 43.35%.

Demographics (2011 Census)
	Total	Male	Female
Population	409	213	196
Children aged below 6 years	93	47	46
Scheduled caste	35	18	17
Scheduled tribe	0	0	0
Literates	137	87	50
Workers (all)	150	94	56
Main workers (total)	89	60	29
Main workers: Cultivators	74	51	23
Main workers: Agricultural labourers	0	0	0
Main workers: Household industry workers	3	1	2
Main workers: Other	12	8	4
Marginal workers (total)	61	34	27
Marginal workers: Cultivators	10	5	5
Marginal workers: Agricultural labourers	41	27	14
Marginal workers: Household industry workers	0	0	0
Marginal workers: Others	10	2	8
Non-workers	259	119	140
