= Omkareshwar Road railway station =

Railway station in Madhya Pradesh

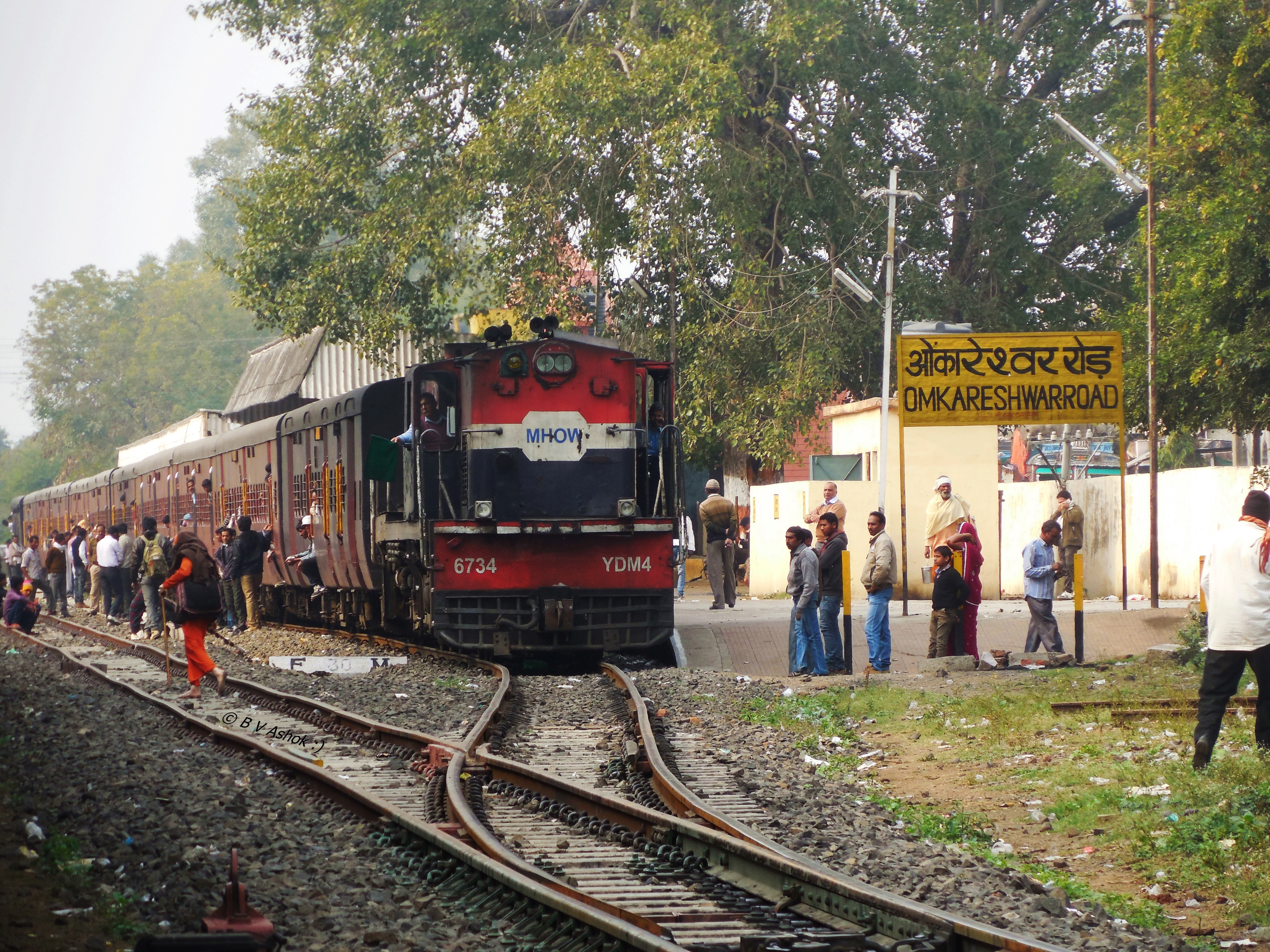
- Omkareshwar Road railway station during Meter Gauge

General information
- Location: Khandwa Road, Mortakka, Khandwa, Madhya Pradesh; India
- Coordinates: 22.2150°N 76.0463°E
- Elevation: 182 metres (597 ft)
- System: Indian Railways station
- Owner: Indian Railways
- Operator: Western Railway
- Line: Akola–Ratlam rail line
- Platforms: 2
- Tracks: 4
- Connections: Auto stand

Construction
- Structure type: Standard (on-ground station)
- Parking: No
- Cycle facilities: No

Other information
- Status: Functioning
- Station code: OM
- Zone(s): Western Railway
- Division(s): Ratlam

History
- Electrified: Ongoing

Services
Preceding station	Indian Railways	Following station
Sanawad towards ?	Western Railway zone Akola–Ratlam line	Barwaha towards ?
Location
- Interactive map

Omkareshwar Road railway station is a small railway station in Khandwa district, Madhya Pradesh. Its code is OM. It serves Omkareshwar town. The station consists of two platforms. The platforms are not well sheltered. It lacks many facilities including water and sanitation. The station is situated on the 1,000 mm (3 ft 3 3/8 in) metre gauge Akola–Ratlam rail line, which is the under gauge conversion. Once finished will provide vital connectivity between Indore with rest of Northern India.

== Major trains ==
Some of the important trains that runs from Omkareshwar are:

- 52963/52964 Mhow–Sanawad Passenger
- 52975/52976 Mhow–Sanawad Passenger
- 52973/52974 Mhow–Sanawad Passenger
- 52973/52974 Mhow–Sanawad Passenger

== Connectivity ==
The station is connected with Dr. Ambedkar Nagar Railway Station (MHOW) to the north west and Sanawad to the south-east on the Dr. Ambedkar Nagar (MHOW) - Sanawad Meter Gauge Railline.

The station is well-connected to Indore Jn. via Dr. Ambedkar Nagar, MHOW.

== Electrification ==
At present, the station is on non-electrified rail route.

== Developments ==
The conversion of Dr. Ambedkar Nagar Railway Station (MHOW) to Sanawad (meter-gauge) to (broad-gauge) rail line is in progress. Upon completion, It would directly connect Indore to Mumbai.
