= Tihi railway station =

Railway station in Madhya Pradesh

Tihi

General information
- Location: Rau-Pithampur Road, Pithampur, Madhya Pradesh; India
- Coordinates: 22.6190°N 75.7342°E
- Elevation: 567 metres (1,860 ft)
- System: Indian Railways station
- Owner: Indian Railways
- Operator: Ratlam railway division
- Line: Indore–Dahod line
- Platforms: 1
- Tracks: 3

Construction
- Structure type: Standard (on-ground station)
- Parking: Yes
- Cycle facilities: Yes
- Accessible: Disabled access

Other information
- Status: Functioning
- Station code: TIHI
- Fare zone: Western Railways

History
- Opened: 24 October 2016; 9 years ago

Services
Preceding station	Indian Railways	Following station
Rau towards ?	Western Railway zone Indore–Dahod line	Pithampur towards ?
Location
- Location within India Location within Madhya Pradesh
- Interactive map

Tihi railway station (station code: TIHI) is a local railway station in Pithampur in the suburb of Indore. This station lies on the unfinished Indore–Dahod line. The station was built for operations of goods and container trains providing direct connectivity to the industries in Pithampur.

== Development ==
Tihi station is primarily aimed to be an industrial transport station and various pacts have been linked to ensure that the upcoming multi-modal logistics park and nearby industrial region is well connected with other ports of India via the station.

== See also ==
- Akola–Ratlam (metre-gauge trains)
- Indore Junction railway station
- Mhow railway station
