= Patalpani–Kalakund section =

Train in India

Overview
- Status: Operational
- Owner: Indian Railways
- Locale: Madhya Pradesh
- Termini: Patalpani (PTP); Kalakund (KKD)
- Stations: 3

Service
- Operator: Western Railway

Technical
- Track length: 15 km (9 mi)
- Number of tracks: 1
- Track gauge: 1,000 mm (3 ft 3 3/8 in)
- Electrification: No
- Operating speed: 6 km/h (3.7 mph) average with halts

The Patalpani–Kalakund section belongs to Ratlam division of Western Railway zone in Madhya Pradesh state of India.

== History ==
The Holkar State Railway was established in 1874 as a metre-gauge (MG) line originating from the Great Indian Peninsula Railway (GIPR) station at Khandwa and extending northwards. The railway reached Indore in 1876 following the completion of the Holkar–Narmada Bridge across the Narmada River. The line had a total length of 86 miles (138 km). The railway was financed by the Maharaja Holkar of Indore and was owned by the princely State of Indore.

This line connected Hyderabad-Rajasthan, By 2020s, some sections of the route, from Secunderabad/Kacheguda-Malkajgiri-Nizamabad-Mudkhed-Purna-Akola, Khandwa-Sanawad & Dr. Ambedkar Nagar-Indore-Fatehabad-Ratlam-Chittaurgarh-Ajmer lines were converted to broad gauge and electrified. However, a section of the original alignment between Patalpani and Kalakund was preserved as a metre-gauge heritage line. To maintain seamless rail connectivity, a parallel electrified broad-gauge track was constructed between these stations.

Today, heritage train services operate on the preserved metre-gauge section, offering passengers a glimpse into the region's historic railway legacy. The 52966/Kalakund–Patalpani Heritage Train runs with an average speed of 6 km/h and completes 15 km in more than an hour.

The train consist of 6 coaches:

Loco	1	2	3	4	5	6
	D1	D2	D3	SLR	C1	C2

== Route and halts ==
- Patalpani
- Patalpani Waterfall
- Kalakund

== Traction ==
Both up and down trains are hauled by a YDM-4 diesel locomotive from Patalpani to Kalakund and vice versa. A banker locomotive is also attached from Kalakund to Patalpani due to steep incline of 1:40 gradient.

== See also ==
- Akola–Ratlam rail line
- Mountain railways of India
