= Patalpani Waterfall =

Waterfall in India

Coordinates: 22.5039°N 75.7987°E

Patalpani Falls
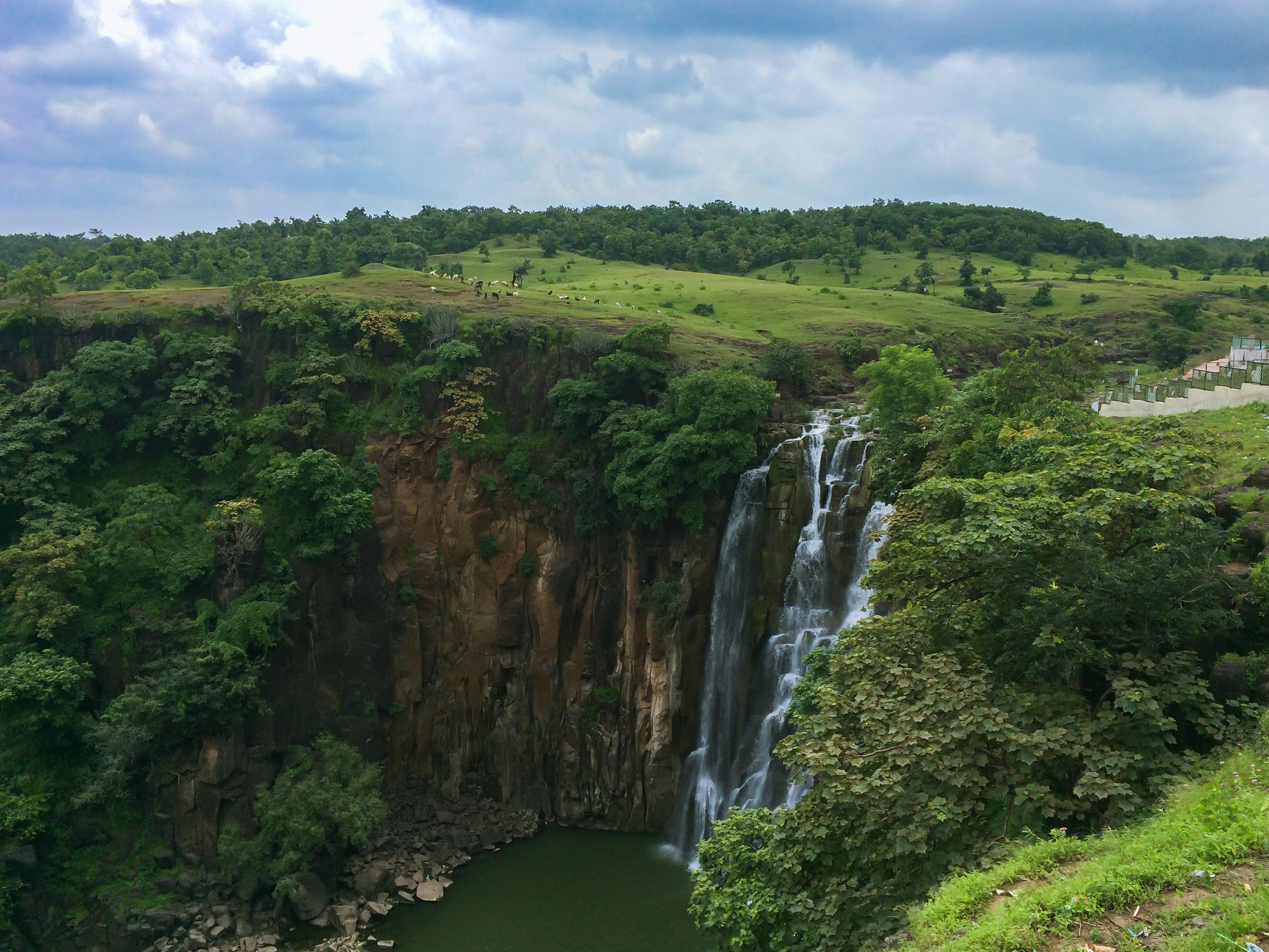
- Location: Mhow, Indore district, Madhya Pradesh, India
- Type: segmented
- Total height: 91.5 metres (300 ft)
- Number of drops: 1
- Watercourse: Choral River

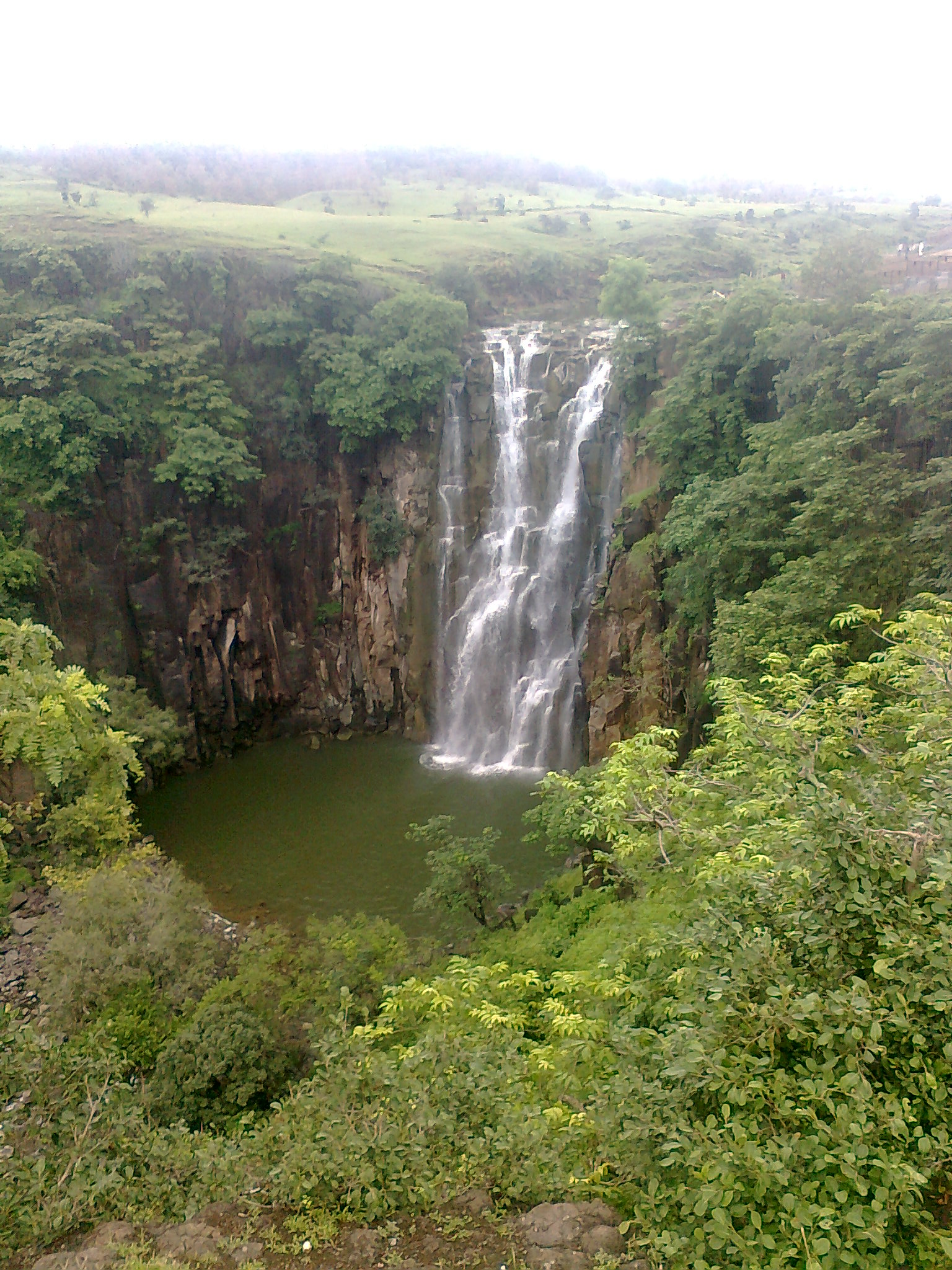
Patalpani waterfall.

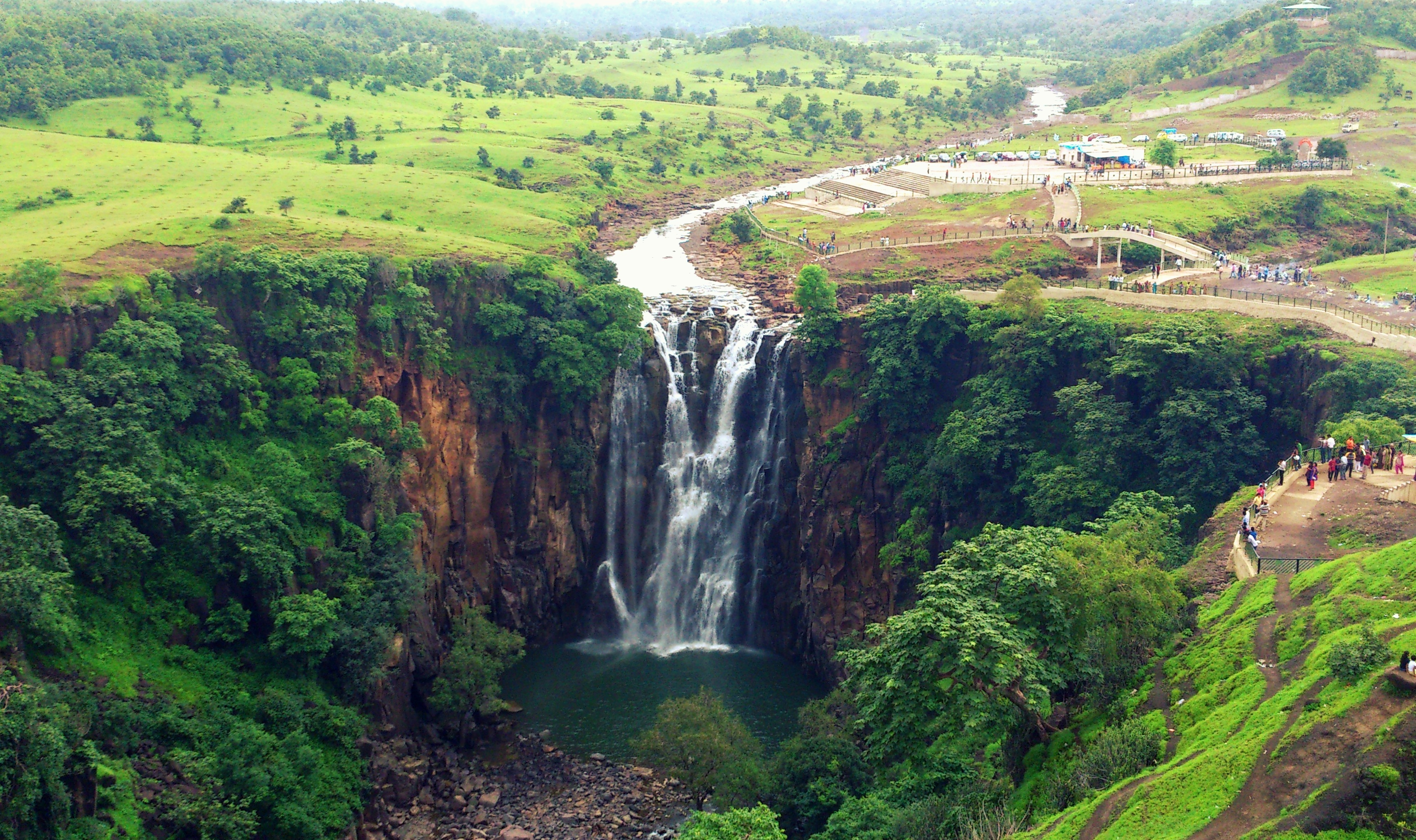
PatalPani Waterfall, a magnificent fall situated around 35 KM from Indore, Madhya Pradesh, India. July 2013.

The Patalpani Waterfall is a waterfall on the Choral River, a tributary of the Narmada, located in the Mhow Tehsil of Indore district in the state of Madhya Pradesh, India.

== The falls ==
The approximate height of Patalpani Waterfall is 91 m (300 ft). The water flow is highest immediately after the rainy season (usually after July). It goes almost dry in the summer season, and the stream is reduced to a trickle. The area around Patalpani is a popular picnic and trekking spot.

== Etymology ==
According to folklore, the pit (kund) at the bottom of the falls goes as deep as patal (the underworld in Indian mythology). Therefore, the falls are called Patal-pani, pani being the Hindi word for water.

== Location ==
The nearest airport is Indore International Airport which is situated at a distance of roughly 40 km from the falls. The rest of the distance has to be covered via road or rail transport means. Dr. Ambedkar Nagar (MHOW) is the nearest town.

=== Rail ===
The nearest railway station is Patalpani railway station near the falls at a distance of 200 m on the Dr. Ambedkar Nagar Railway Station (MHOW)-Sanawad metre gauge train line. Two trains run on these route, one being the Heritage Train from Dr. Ambedkar Nagar Railway Station (MHOW) till Kalakund and the local train between Dr. Ambedkar Nagar Railway Station (MHOW) and Sanawad.

The heritage train offers views of the Ghats, the Valleys, the Choral River and the rail line itself which more than a century old. It returns back the same day to Dr. Ambedkar Nagar (MHOW) from Kalakund in the evening.

=== Road ===
To reach the waterfall via road, one has to first reach Dr. Ambedkar Nagar (MHOW) town in Indore District. From there, the waterfall is situated at a distance of 8 km on internal country roads.

== Accidents ==
=== Deaths in 2011 ===
During the monsoon season (July-September), the area is prone to flash floods. On 17 July 2011, heavy rains occurred in the catchment area upstream of the waterfall. Over 50 visitors, many of them on a picnic, were sitting near the waterfall at that time. The local villagers warned them about the risk, and asked them to move away from water. Most of the visitors managed to get to safety, but five people were not able to move away in time. However, as they were crossing the stream, they were washed away in a sudden gush of water. Only two of them survived. The bodies of the victims were found over the next week: Chavi Dhoot of 22 years (18 July), Chandrashekhar Rathi of 55 years (19 July) and His daughter Mudita Rathi of 22 years (20 July). A video of the accident went viral. Subsequently, the local administration constructed a bridge and a staircase to avoid similar mishaps.

== See also ==
- List of waterfalls
- List of waterfalls in India
