= Kotla Kheri railway station =

Railway station in Madhya Pradesh

General information
- Location: MP SH 27, Khandwa district, Madhya Pradesh; India
- Coordinates: 22.075°N 76.174°E
- Elevation: 223 metres (732 ft)
- System: Indian Railways station
- Owner: Indian Railways
- Operator: Western Railway
- Line: Akola–Ratlam line
- Platforms: 1
- Tracks: 2

Construction
- Structure type: Standard (on-ground station)
- Parking: No
- Cycle facilities: No

Other information
- Status: Construction – gauge conversion
- Station code: KTKH
- Zone(s): Western Railway
- Division(s): Ratlam

Services
Preceding station	Indian Railways	Following station
Attar towards ?	Western Railway zone Akola–Ratlam line	Nimar Kheri towards ?
Location
- Interactive map

Kotla Kheri railway station is a small railway station in Khandwa district, Madhya Pradesh. Its code is KTKH. It serves Kotla Kheri village. The station consists of a single platform, not well sheltered. It lacks many facilities including water and sanitation. Recently gauge conversion started on this line. After conversion it will connect Indore to South India.

== Major trains ==
Presently, only one train operates from the station and is listed as follows:

Number	Name	Type
01091/92	Sanawad - Khandwa MEMU	Local
