= Rajendra Nagar railway station =

Railway station in Madhya Pradesh

Rajendra Nagar

General information
- Location: Rajendra Nagar, Indore, Madhya Pradesh; India
- Elevation: 573 m (1,880 ft)
- System: Passenger train station
- Owner: Indian Railways
- Operator: Ratlam railway division
- Line: Akola–Ratlam line
- Tracks: 4 BG
- Connections: Auto Stand

Construction
- Structure type: Standard (on-ground station)
- Parking: Available
- Cycle facilities: Available
- Accessible: Disabled access

Other information
- Status: Operational
- Station code: RJQ
- Fare zone: Western Railways

History
- Opened: 1998 as broad gauge
- Closed: 2011 for Metre Gauge
- Rebuilt: 2015–2016

Passengers
- 11,000

Services
Preceding station	Indian Railways	Following station
Lokmanya Nagar towards ?	Western Railway zone Akola–Ratlam line	Rau towards ?
Lokmanya Nagar towards ?	Western Railway zone Indore-Dahod line	Rau towards ?
Location
- Interactive map

The Rajendra Nagar railway station (station code: RJQ) is one of the local railway station in the city of Indore.

The station is located on the Akola-Ratlam line of Indian Railways. It is equipped with two reservation counters. It was a metre-gauge station earlier but now has been converted into broad-gauge station under the Ratlam-Akola Gauge Conversion Project.

Additionally the station operates in double-track system, however only single track has been used so far. The station is also used as railway yard to park some trains for the busy Indore Junction.

== Major trains ==
The following trains have stoppage at the station.

Number	Train	From	To	Type
NA	Dr. Ambedkar Nagar - Ratlam DEMU passenger train	DADN	RTM	Local
NA	Dr. Ambedkar Nagar - Indore DEMU passenger train	DADN	INDB	Local
