= Barwaha railway station =

Railway station in Madhya Pradesh

General information
- Location: State Highway 38, Barwaha, Madhya Pradesh; India
- Coordinates: 22.2561°N 76.0310°E
- Elevation: 197 metres (646 ft)
- System: Indian Railways station
- Owner: Indian Railways
- Operator: Western Railway
- Line: Akola–Ratlam line
- Platforms: 3
- Tracks: 4
- Connections: Auto stand

Construction
- Structure type: Standard (on-ground station)
- Parking: Yes
- Cycle facilities: Yes

Other information
- Status: Functioning
- Station code: BWW
- Zone(s): Western Railway
- Division(s): Ratlam

History
- Electrified: Ongoing

Services
Preceding station	Indian Railways	Following station
Omkareshwar Road towards ?	Western Railway zone Akola–Ratlam line	Mukhtiara Balwada towards ?
Location
- Interactive map

Barwaha railway station is a main railway station in Khargone district, Madhya Pradesh. Its code is BWW. Barwaha railway station was an important station during meter gauge and all trains took halt here because of Omkareshwar, Maheshwar, CISF, and many industrial factories. The station consists of three platforms. The platforms are not well sheltered. It lacks many facilities including water and sanitation. The station is situated on the 1,000 mm (3 ft 3 3/8 in) metre gauge Akola–Ratlam rail line, which is undergoing gauge conversion. Once finished, it will provide vital connectivity between Indore with Southern Indian states.

== Barwaha - Bodeli (Narmada Valley ) Railway Line ==
Barwaha is an important industrial as well as religious and economical city. In 1906, a survey was done to connect Barwaha and Bodeli, Gujarat. Construction of Bodeli to Chhota Udaipur was completed but unfortunately Chhota Udaipur to Barwaha was not constructed.

Click this link to read about that important but unfortunate railway.

Following are some important phrases from the letters written for this line:

- P. H. Maflin, O. B. E., M. C., Railway Departmcnt, ( Railway Board ) was appointed to carry out the investigation, already stated was to comprehend the area bounded by the railways connecting Surat, Godhra, Ratlam, Indore, Barwaha, Khandwa and Bhusaval) and to make recommendations for the development of this area by feeder railways.
- He also invited the views of the Baroda Government on the

(1) Chhota Udepur—Kuksi—Barwaha via Alirajpur and

( 2 ) Piplod—Devgadh Baria—Alirajpur—Kuksi - Barwaha projects

- With the construction of the railway, Mr. Maflinthinks, a new orientation will be given to the imports and exports, the distance from Barwaha to Bombay being:

via Khandwa 394 miles,

via Ratlam and Baroda 528 miles, and

via the proposed chord 434 miles.

- If no decision be arrived at early on the alignment of the proposed Chhota Udaipur Barwaha section Chord, Mr. Maflin suggests that a traffic survey be commenced as early as possible of the section from Barwaha to Kuksi with a branch to Chikalda. This section would traverse the most prosperousportion of the Narmada Valley north of the river.
- There is no road at present between Maheshwar and the Agra-Bombay Road and none is likely to be built for some time, as the Karam river forming the Dhar—Indore boundary intervenes and the Dhar Darbar have no inducement to contribute to the cost of one bridge or to construct the length of road in their territory . There is a motorservice to Barwaha from Maheshwar and neighbouring town of Mandleshwar which meets all existing requirements, but if more were needed a branch line could be built from Barwaha.
- The Baroda Government replied that they had no objection to the proposed extension of the Bodeli—Chhota Udaipur Railway towards Central India. As regards the alignment, they were inclined to prefer a line to Barwaha via Alirajpur, Kuksi, Singana, Bakaner and Dharampuri.
- They were not in favor of a line to Khandwa via Barwani as such a line would have to cross the Narmada at some point.

== Major trains ==
Some of the important trains that runs from Barwaha are :

- 52963/52964 Mhow–Barwaha Passenger
- 52975/52976 Mhow–Barwaha Passenger
- 52973/52974 Mhow–Barwaha Passenger
- 52973/52974 Mhow–Barwaha Passenger

== Connectivity ==
The station is connected with Dr. Ambedkar Nagar Railway Station (MHOW) to the north west . The station is well-connected to Indore Jn. via Dr. Ambedkar Nagar, MHOW.

== Electrification ==
At present, the station is on non-electrified rail route.

== Developments ==
The conversion of Dr. Ambedkar Nagar Railway Station (MHOW) to Barwaha (meter-gauge) to (broad-gauge) rail line is in progress. Upon completion, It would directly connect Indore to Mumbai.
