= Jhabua railway station =

Railway station in Madhya Pradesh

General information
- Location: Jhabua, Madhya Pradesh; India
- Elevation: 334 metres (1,096 ft)
- System: Indian Railways station
- Owner: Indian Railways
- Operator: Western Railway
- Line: Indore–Dahod line
- Platforms: 2
- Tracks: 2

Construction
- Structure type: Standard (on-ground station)
- Parking: No
- Cycle facilities: No

Other information
- Status: Active
- Station code: JHBUA
- Zone(s): Western Railway
- Division(s): Ratlam

History
- Opened: March 2024

Jhabua railway station is a proposed railway station in Jhabua district, Madhya Pradesh. Its code is JHBUA. It will serve Jhabua city. The station proposal includes two platforms. The work on this rail line is expected to be finished year 2024.
