= Choral River =

Location
- Country: India
- State: Madhya Pradesh

Physical characteristics
- Source: Vindhyachal Range
- Mouth: Narmada River
  - location: Barwaha, Khargone district
  - coordinates: 22°14′01″N 76°04′06″E
- Length: 55 km (34 mi)
- Basin size: 601 km^{2} (232 sq mi)

Basin features
- River system: Narmada River

The Choral River is a tributary of the Narmada River of Central India.

== Course ==
Choral river rises in the Vindhyachal Range of Indore District and after flowing in a northeast direction through the mountains, it turns south after exiting the Vindhyas near Patalpani waterfall and joins Narmada River in Barwaha city. The Choral river has a length of 55 km.and also choral picnic spot, ratbi picnic spot, chidia bhadak waterfall in barwaha city

== Dam ==
Choral Dam, constructed in the upper reaches of the river, is a popular picnic destination around Indore City.

== Surroundings ==
Patalpani waterfall is popular picnic spot on the course of Choral River.
