= Rau railway station =

Railway station in Madhya Pradesh, India

Rau

General information
- Location: NH52 (earlier NH3), Rau, Indore; India
- Coordinates: 22.633636°N 75.8031038°E
- Elevation: 587 m (1,926 ft)
- System: Express train and Passenger train station
- Owner: Indian Railways
- Line: Akola–Ratlam line
- Platforms: BG
- Tracks: 4 BG
- Connections: Taxi stand, auto stand

Construction
- Structure type: Standard (on-ground station)
- Parking: Available
- Cycle facilities: Available
- Accessible: Disabled access

Other information
- Status: Fully operational broad gauge (BG converted lines)
- Station code: RAU
- Fare zone: Western Railways

History
- Electrified: Yes, from 2017 onwards

Services
Preceding station	Indian Railways	Following station
Rajendra Nagar towards ?	Western Railway zone Akola–Ratlam line	Haranya Kheri towards ?
Rajendra Nagar towards ?	Western Railway zone Indore-Dahod line	Tihi towards ?
Location
- Interactive map

The Rau railway station is one of the local railway stations in Rau, a suburb of Indore.

Rau is situated on rail line from Ratlam to Akola. Rail line is now converted from meter-gauge to broad-gauge between Ratlam and Mhow. Rau is well connected to Indore, Ratlam, Mhow, Khandwa, Akola and Ujjain. Nearest broad-gauge railway station is the main railway station that is at Indore BG which is 18 km away. The next nearest stations are Mhow (Dr. Ambedkar Nagar railway station) towards the south which is around 13 km to the south and Tihi which is on the new Indore–Dahod & Indore–Chota Udepur railway line which is under construction. Rau is soon to be an official junction once the aforementioned lines become fully operational for passengers. The new line which diverges to the west is single line broad-gauge and non-electrified railway line mainly used to transport containers from Pithampur dry containers port near Tihi. The new railway line from Rau is laid till Tihi and the is under progress at snails pace. In 2008, the Union Cabinet approved the gauge conversion for the Ratlam–Mhow-Khandwa–Akola railway line.(472.64 km). The cost of the gauge conversion would be about Rs.1421.25 crore.

== Major trains ==
The following trains have stoppage at the station.

Number	Train	From	To	Type
NA	Dr. Ambedkar Nagar - Ratlam DEMU passenger train	DADN	RTM	Local
NA	Dr. Ambedkar Nagar - Indore DEMU passenger train	DADN	INDB	Local

== See also ==
- Akola–Ratlam metre-gauge line
