= Dr. Ambedkar Nagar–Nagpur Superfast Express =

Train in India

Overview
- Service type: Superfast
- Locale: Madhya Pradesh, Maharashtra
- First service: 2005; 21 years ago
- Current operator: Western Railways

Route
- Termini: Dr. Ambedkar Nagar; Nagpur
- Stops: 12
- Distance travelled: 629 km (391 mi)
- Average journey time: 11 hours 30 minutes
- Service frequency: Weekly
- Train number: 12923/12924

On-board services
- Classes: AC 2 Tier, AC 3 Tier, Sleeper Class, General Unreserved
- Seating arrangements: Yes
- Sleeping arrangements: Yes
- Auto-rack arrangements: No
- Catering facilities: Yes
- Observation facilities: The train was extended from Indore to Dr. Ambedkar Nagar (Mhow) from January 2020
- Entertainment facilities: No
- Baggage facilities: No
- Other facilities: LHB coach

Technical
- Rolling stock: 1 shared with Dr. Ambedkar Nagar–Kamakhya Weekly Express
- Track gauge: 1,676 mm (5 ft 6 in)
- Electrification: Yes
- Operating speed: 55 km/h (34 mph) (average with halts)
Route map
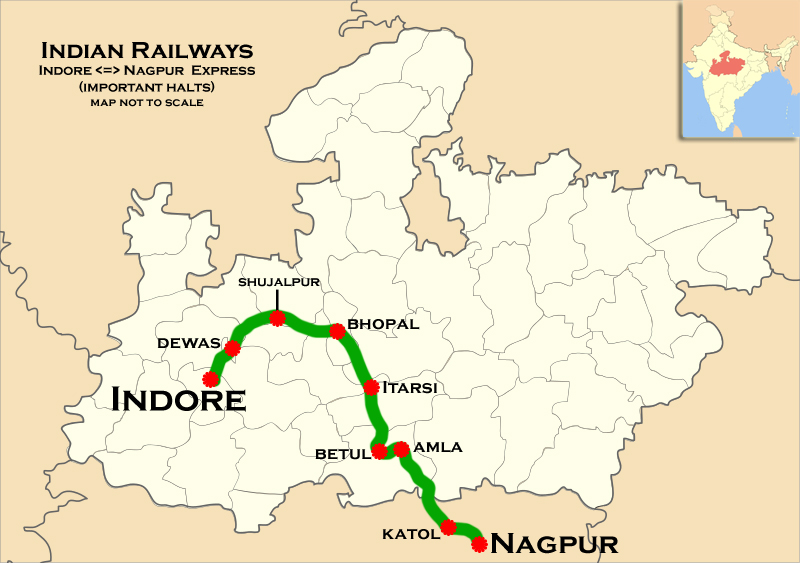

The 12923/12924 Dr. Ambedkar Nagar–Nagpur Superfast Express is a weekly superfast train of Indian Railways, which runs between Dr. Ambedkar Nagar railway station of Indore, the largest city and commercial hub of Central Indian state Madhya Pradesh and Nagpur, the third largest city of neighbouring state Maharashtra. The train was extended from Indore to Mhow from January 2020.

== Coach composition ==
The train consists of 22 coaches :

- 1 AC II Tier
- 3 AC III Tier
- 11 Sleeper class
- 4 General Unreserved
- 1 Pantry car
- 2 End-on Generator

Loco	1	2	3	4	5	6	7	8	9	10	11	12	13	14	15	16	17	18	19	20	21	22
	EOG	GS	GS	A1	B1	B2	B3	PC	S1	S2	S3	S4	S5	S6	S7	S8	S9	S10	S11	GS	GS	EOG

== Service ==
12923/ Dr. Ambedkar Nagar–Nagpur Express has an average speed of 55 km/h and covers 608 km in 11 hrs 30 mins.

The 12924/Nagpur–Dr. Ambedkar Nagar Express has an average speed of 57 km/h and covers 608 km in 11 hrs 35 mins.

== Route and halts ==
The important halts of the train are:

- Dr. Ambedkar Nagar
- Indore Junction
- Dewas Junction
- Maksi Junction
- Shujalpur
- Rani Kamalapati
- Itarsi Junction
- Betul
- Amla Junction
- Multai
- Pandhurna
- Katol
- Nagpur Junction

== Schedule ==
Train number	Station code	Departure station	Departure time	Departure day	Arrival station	Arrival time	Arrival day
12923	INDB	Dr. Ambedkar Nagar	20:55	Tue	Nagpur Junction	08:25	Wed
12924	NGP	Nagpur Junction	19:00	Wed	Dr. Ambedkar Nagar	06:35	Thu

== Traction ==
Both trains are hauled by a Vadodara Electric Loco Shed-based WAP-5 or WAP-4E electric locomotive.

== See also ==
- Ahilyanagari Express
