= Ajanti railway station =

Railway station in Madhya Pradesh

General information
- Location: Khandwa, MP; India
- Coordinates: 21.8949°N 76.2862°E
- Elevation: 345 metres (1,132 ft)
- System: Indian Railways station
- Owner: Indian Railways
- Operator: Western Railway
- Line: Akola–Ratlam rail line
- Platforms: 1
- Tracks: 2
- Connections: Auto stand

Construction
- Structure type: Standard (on-ground station)
- Parking: No
- Cycle facilities: No

Other information
- Status: Active
- Station code: ANI
- Zone(s): Western Railway
- Division(s): Ratlam

History
- Opened: 1904

Services
Preceding station	Indian Railways	Following station
Khandwa Junction towards ?	Western Railway zone Akola–Ratlam line	Attar towards ?
Location
- Interactive map

Ajanti railway station is a small railway station in Khandwa district, Madhya Pradesh. Its code is ANI. It serves Ajanti village. The station consists of a single platform. The platform is not well sheltered. It lacks many facilities including water and sanitation. In 2015, gauge conversion started on this line. After conversion it will connect Indore to South India.

== Major trains ==
Presently, only one train operates from the station and is listed as follows:

Number	Name	Type
01091/92	Sanawad - Khandwa MEMU	Local

== Controversy ==
In April 2014, a station master was caught stealing kerosene that was supposed to be for the station generator.
