= Nimar Kheri railway station =

Railway station in Madhya Pradesh

Nimar Kheri
- Indian Railways logo

General information
- Location: SH-27, Nimar Kheri, Khandwa district, Madhya Pradesh; India
- Coordinates: 22.111°N 76.151°E
- Elevation: 214 metres (702 ft)
- System: Indian Railways station
- Owner: Indian Railways
- Operator: Western Railways
- Line: Akola–Ratlam line
- Platforms: 1
- Tracks: 2 broad gauge

Construction
- Structure type: Standard (on-ground station)
- Parking: Yes
- Cycle facilities: No

Other information
- Status: Functioning
- Station code: NKR
- Zone(s): Western Railway zone
- Division(s): Ratlam

History
- Electrified: Yes (in 2020)

Services
Preceding station	Indian Railways	Following station
Kotla Kheri towards ?	Western Railway zone Akola–Ratlam line	Sanawad towards ?
Location
- Interactive map

Nimar Kheri railway station is a small railway station in Khandwa district, Madhya Pradesh. Its code is NKR. It serves Nimar Kheri town. The station consists of one platform. The platform is not well sheltered. It lacks many facilities including water and sanitation. Recently gauge conversion started on this line. After conversion it will connect Indore to South India.

== Major trains ==
Presently, only one train operates from the station and is listed as follows:

Number	Name	Type
01091/92	Sanawad - Khandwa MEMU	Local
