= Kalakund railway station =

Railway station in Madhya Pradesh

General information
- Location: Kalakund, Indore district, Madhya Pradesh; India
- Coordinates: 22.478°N 75.860°E
- Elevation: 403 metres (1,322 ft)
- System: Indian Railways station
- Owner: Indian Railways
- Operator: North Western Railway
- Line: Akola–Ratlam line
- Platforms: 1
- Tracks: 2

Construction
- Structure type: Standard (on-ground station)
- Parking: No
- Cycle facilities: No

Other information
- Status: Active
- Station code: KKD
- Zone(s): Western Railway
- Division(s): Ratlam

Services
Preceding station	Indian Railways	Following station
Choral towards ?	Western Railway zone Akola–Ratlam line	Patalpani towards ?
Location
- Interactive map

Kalakund railway station is a small railway station in Indore district, Madhya Pradesh. Its code is KKD. It serves Kalakund village. The station consists of a single platform, and is not well sheltered. It lacks some facilities including refreshment stalls. Recently gauge conversion started on this line. After conversion it will connect Indore to South India. This railway station was depicted in the R. Balki film of 2018, Pad Man, starring Akshay Kumar.

== Connectivity ==
The station is connected with Dr. Ambedkar Nagar Railway Station (MHOW) to the north west and Sanawad to the south-east on the Dr. Ambedkar Nagar (MHOW) - Sanawad Meter Gauge Railline.

The station is well-connected to Indore Jn. via Dr. Ambedkar Nagar, MHOW.

== Electrification ==
At present, the station is on non-electrified rail route.

== Developments ==
The conversion of Dr. Ambedkar Nagar Railway Station (MHOW) to Sanawad (meter-gauge) to (broad-gauge) rail line is in progress. Upon completion, It would directly connect Indore to Mumbai.

However, the Kalakund station would be bypassed in the gauge conversion process.
