= Attar railway station =

Railway station in Madhya Pradesh

Coordinates: 21.9991°N 76.2052°E

General information
- Location: Attar, Khandwa district, Madhya Pradesh; India
- Elevation: 214 metres (702 ft)
- System: Indian Railways station
- Owner: Indian Railways
- Operator: Western Railway
- Line: Akola–Ratlam line
- Platforms: 1
- Tracks: 2

Construction
- Structure type: Standard (on-ground station)
- Parking: No
- Cycle facilities: No

Other information
- Status: Active
- Station code: ATR
- Zone(s): Western Railway
- Division(s): Ratlam

Services
Preceding station	Indian Railways	Following station
Ajanti towards ?	Western Railway zone Akola–Ratlam line	Kotla Kheri towards ?
Location
- Interactive map

Attar railway station is a small railway station in Khandwa district, Madhya Pradesh. Its code is ATR. It serves Attar village. The station consists of a single platform. The platform is not well sheltered. It lacks many facilities including water and sanitation. Recently gauge conversion started on this line. After conversion it will connect Indore to South India.

== Major trains ==
Presently, only one train operates from the station and is listed as follows:

Number	Name	Type
01091/92	Sanawad - Khandwa MEMU	Local
