= Janmabhoomi Express =

Train in India

Overview
- Service type: Superfast Express
- Locale: Andhra Pradesh & Telangana
- First service: 1 July 2007; 19 years ago
- Current operator: South Coast Railways

Route
- Termini: Lingampalli (LPI); Visakhapatnam (VSKP)
- Stops: 19
- Distance travelled: 710 km (440 mi)
- Average journey time: 12 hours 30 minutes
- Service frequency: Daily
- Train number: 12805 / 12806

On-board services
- Classes: 2nd Seating, AC 3 tier economy, AC Chair Car, General Unreserved
- Seating arrangements: Yes
- Sleeping arrangements: Yes ( 3E )
- Catering facilities: On-board catering
- Observation facilities: Large windows
- Entertainment facilities: none
- Other facilities: Below the seats

Technical
- Rolling stock: LHB coach
- Track gauge: 1,676 mm (5 ft 6 in)
- Operating speed: 55 km/h (34 mph) average with halts
Route map
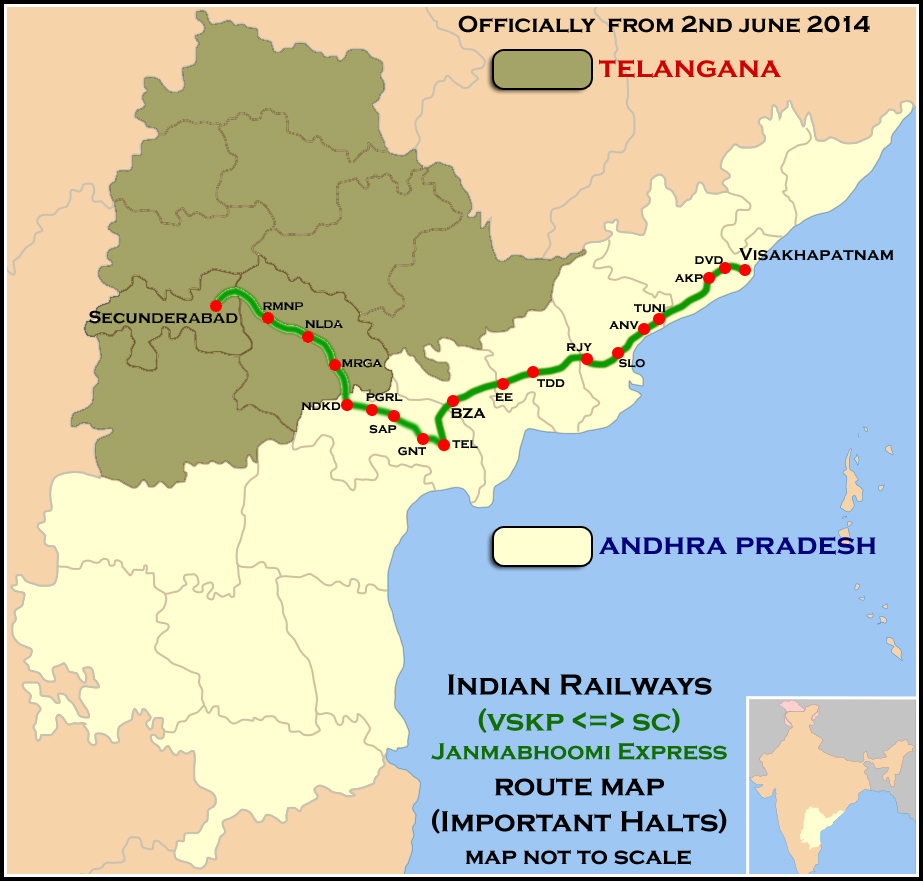

The 12805 / 12806 Janmabhoomi Express is an InterCity service of Indian Railways that travels from Lingampalli to Visakhapatnam. It was first introduced between Visakhapatnam and Vijayawada Jn. It was later extended up to Tenali Jn and then the Nagarjuna Express (Secunderabad–Tenali Junction–Secunderabad) was cancelled and thus made the Visakhapatnam–Secunderabad Janmabhoomi Express via Tenali Junction, and now it is extended from Secunderabad Junction to Lingampalli. It is an express service that travels in Andhra Pradesh and Telangana. The train travels at an average speed of 55 km/h and uses a WAP-7 from Lingampalli to Tenali Jn . An extra locomotive is attached at Guntur Jn at the back to reduce loco reversal time at Tenali Jn. It is classified as an Express in the Indian Railways classification list.

Janmabhoomi has 24 coaches, of which 8 are unreserved, 2 are luggage cum baggage coaches, 11 Non AC chair car second class coaches and 3 AC chair car. Daily one train will depart from Visakhapatnam and one from Lingampalli station. At Lingampalli will start by 6:15 a.m. and it will reach Visakhapatnam by 19:40 p.m. and train from Visakhapatnam will start by 6:15 a.m. and it will reach Lingampalli by 19:40 p.m.

== Coaches ==
Janmabhoomi Express has 22 coaches, of which 6 are Unreserved General Coaches, 11 second class (2nd Seating) coaches, 1 AC Chair Car coach, 2 AC 3-Tier Economy coaches along with 1 EoG and 1 SLR coach. It was upgraded to LHB coaches on 23 February 2023.

== Traction ==
Earlier it was hauled by WDP-4D of Gooty Shed from Secunderabad Junction to Tenali Junction because the Secunderabad Junction–Guntur Junction route was not electrified and WAP-4 of Erode Shed from Tenali Junction to Visakhapatnam.

Currently the route is electrified and it is hauled by a Lallaguda Loco Shed-based WAP-7 or Vijayawada Loco Shed based WAP-4 electric locomotive on its entire journey.

To avoid time consumption at Tenali Junction for loco reversal, this train will be attached with Vijayawada Loco Shed based WAP-4 or WAP-7 at rear side and runs as push-pull mode between Guntur Junction and Vijayawada Junction and Vice versa.

== Statistics ==
This is a day intercity express. It has only second seating and chair car which can be reserved. A 3rd AC economy coach was added in July 2023. there is no pantry car for this train. This train stops at Charlapalli, Ramannapet, Nalgonda, Miryalaguda, Nadikude Jn, Piduguralla, Sattenapalli, Guntur Jn, Tenali Junction, Vijayawada Jn, Nuzvid, Eluru, Tadepalligudem, Rajahmundry, Samalkota Jn, Annavaram, Tuni, Yelamanchili, Anakapalli, Duvvada.

== Other lines ==
Janmabhoomi Express is a popular train to take but can be very busy. Alternatives include the Hyderabad–Visakhapatnam Godavari Express, Visakhapatnam–Hazur Sahib Nanded Superfast Express and the Konark Express (which stops at Visakhapatnam, but usually follows the normal route of Konark which is Mumbai to Bhubaneswar). The Secunderabad–Visakhapatnam Duronto Express is also an option as is the Visakhapatnam–Secunderabad Garib Rath Express. Duronto is faster but does not have full accommodations; Garib Rath is slower but has full accommodations.

== See also ==
- South Central Railway Zone
