= Nagarjuna Express =

The Nagarjuna Express was a train operating on the South Central Railway division of the Indian Railways in India.

== History ==
The Nagarjuna Express originally went from Secunderabad to Guntur, but later was rescheduled to go to Tenali also after Guntur Junction and finally terminated at Secunderabad. The train was upgraded to Superfast from its old number 7005/7006 to 2719/2720.

=== Cancellation ===
This train was cancelled in the third week of June 2007 and 2805/2806 Visakhapatnam–Tenali Janmabhoomi Express extended to Secunderabad.
