= Saifee Nagar railway station =

Railway station in Madhya Pradesh

General information
- Location: Veer Sawarkar Nagar, Indore; India
- Coordinates: 22.699271°N 75.8518496°E
- Elevation: 557 m (1,827 ft)
- System: Express train and Passenger train station
- Owner: Indian Railways
- Operator: Ratlam railway division
- Line: Indore–Mumbai
- Platforms: 2
- Tracks: 2

Construction
- Structure type: Standard (on ground station)
- Parking: Available
- Cycle facilities: Available
- Accessible: Disabled access

Other information
- Status: Construction - Gauge Conv - MG/NG to Single Diesel BG
- Station code: SFNR
- Fare zone: Western Railways

History
- Opened: 1988
- Rebuilt: 1999
- Electrified: 2011

Services
Preceding station	Indian Railways	Following station
Lokmanya Nagar towards ?	Western Railway zone Akola–Ratlam rail line	Indore Junction towards ?
Location
- Interactive map

Saifee Nagar railway station (station code: SFNR) is a local railway station in Nandanvan Colony, Indore.

Station on the Delhi–Hyderabad metre-gauge line that was founded in the 1970s.

Saifee Nagar has been connected to Indore and Khandwa by metre-gauge railway lines. In 2008, the Union Cabinet approved the gauge conversion for the Ratlam–Mhow–Khandwa–Akola railway line.(472.64 km). The cost of the gauge conversion would be about Rs.1421.25 crore.

== Major trains ==
The following trains have stoppage at the station.

Number	Train	From	To	Type
NA	Dr. Ambedkar Nagar - Ratlam DEMU passenger train	DADN	RTM	Local
NA	Dr. Ambedkar Nagar - Indore DEMU passenger train	DADN	INDB	Local

== Suburban trains ==
The Indore Suburban Railway is a commuter rail system serving the Indore Metropolitan Region. It is operated by Indian Railways' zonal Western Railways (WR). It has the highest passenger density of any urban railway system in Madhya Pradesh. The trains plying on its routes are commonly referred to as local trains or simply as locals.

== See also ==
- Akola–Ratlam line (metre gauge)
