= Mhowgaon =

- Town
- Location in Madhya Pradesh, India Mhowgaon (India)
- Coordinates: 22°34′29.229″N 75°44′40.0302″E
- Country: India
- State: Madhya Pradesh
- Region: Malwa
- District: Indore
- Tehsil: Mhow

Government
  - Type: Council

Area
  - Total: 13 km^{2} (5.0 sq mi)
- Elevation: 572 m (1,877 ft)

Population (2011)
  - Total: 30,012
  - Density: 2,300/km^{2} (6,000/sq mi)
- Time zone: UTC+5:30 (IST)
- PIN: 453441
- Telephone code: 07324
- Vehicle registration: MP-09-XX-XXXX
- Spoken Languages: Hindi
- Sex ratio: 0.900 are ♀/♂
- Literacy Rate: 87.38% (Male); 74.02% (Female)
- Climate: Cwa / Aw (Köppen)
- Precipitation: 945 millimetres (37.2 in)
- Avg. annual temperature: 24.0 °C (75.2 °F)
- Avg. summer temperature: 31 °C (88 °F)
- Avg. winter temperature: 17 °C (63 °F)

Religions in Mhowgaon
Religion	Percent
Hindus	93.59%
Muslims	5.14%
Christian	0.79%
Sikh	0.20%
Jains	0.13%
Buddhism	0.11%
Others†	0.04%
Distribution of religions

Mhowgaon is a Nagar Panchayat under Sub Division Dr. Ambedkar Nagar (Mhow) in Indore district in the Indian state of Madhya Pradesh. The total geographical area of Mhowgaon nagar panchayat is 13.5 km^{2} (1350 hectares) and it is the smallest city by area in the sub district. The population density of the city is 2309 persons per km^{2}. Mhowgaon is divided into 15 wards for which elections are held every 5 years. Among them, Mhowgaon Ward No. 2 is the most populous ward with a population of 3440 and Mhowgaon Ward No. 15 is the least populous ward with a population of 957. Mhowgaon Nagar Panchayat has total administration over 6,373 houses to which it supplies basic amenities like water and sewerage. It is also authorized to build roads within Nagar Panchayat limits and impose taxes on properties coming under its jurisdiction.

The nearest railway station is Mhow Cantt which is 6 km far from here. Mhow is the sub district headquarters and the distance from the city is 4 km. The district headquarters of the city is Indore which is 29 km away. Bhopal is the state headquarters of the city and is 221 km from here. The pin code of Mhowgaon is 453441.

== Connectivity ==
The Gambhir river divides Dr. Ambedkar Nagar (Mhow) cantt. area and Mhowgaon. The Mhow-Neemuch major district road passes over the Gambhir river from where the town starts and ends towards kankarpura lake. There is no railway connectivity to the town. The nearest railway station is Mhow railway station which is 4 km from the town. The nearest airport from the town is Indores Devi Ahilya Bai Holkar Airport, which is approximately 25 km away.

== Demographics ==
As of the 2011 Census of India, Mhowgaon had a population of 30,012. Males constitute 52.61% (from 54% in 2001) of the population and females 47.39% (from 46% in 2001). The population of children of the age of 0-6 is 3996, which is 13.31% of the total population of Mhowgaon (NP). Among them about 16 thousand (53%) are male and about 14 thousand (47%) are female. 76% of the whole population are from the general caste, 17% are from the schedule caste and 6% are from schedule tribes. There are 6373 households in the city and an average 5 persons live in each family.

Religion wise population 2011
	Total	Hindu	Muslim	Christian	Sikh	Buddhist	Jain	Others	Not Stated
Total	30,012	28,087	1,544	237	59	34	39	2	10
Male	15,792	14,780	816	124	33	15	20	2	2
Female	14,220	13,307	728	113	26	19	19	0	8

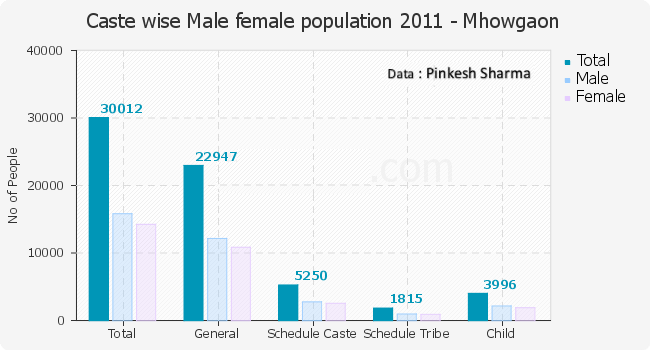

Hinduism is the majority religion of Mhowgaon with 93.59% in which schedule Caste (SC) constitutes 17.49% while Schedule Tribe (ST) were 6.05% of total population in Mhowgaon (NP).

=== Caste wise male female population 2011 ===
	Total	General	Schedule Caste	Schedule Tribe	Child
Total	30,012	22,947	5,250	1,815	3,996
Male	15,792	12,124	2,732	936	2,129
Female	14,220	10,823	2,518	879	1,867

== Growth of population ==
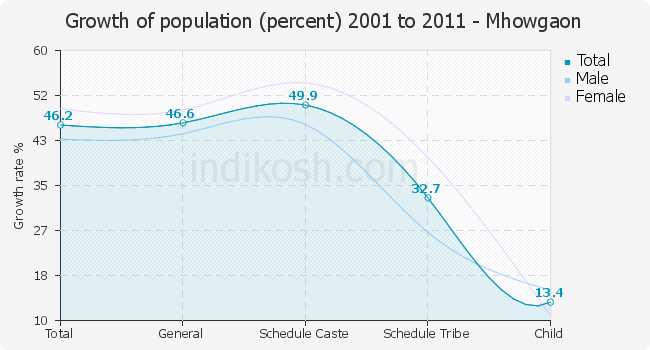

The population of the city has increased by 46.2% in the last 10 years. In the 2001 census the total population was about 21 thousand people. The female population growth rate of the city is 49.2% which is 5.6% higher than the male population growth rate of 43.6%. The general caste population has increased by 46.6% while the Schedule caste population has increased by 49.9%. Schedule Tribe population has increased by 32.7% and child population has increased by 13.4% in the city since the last census.

Growth of population (percent) 2001 to 2011
	Total	General	Schedule Caste	Schedule Tribe	Child
Total	46.2%	46.6%	49.9%	32.7%	13.4%
Male	43.6%	44.6%	46.3%	26.3%	15.6%
Female	49.2%	49%	54%	40.2%	10.9%

Historical and projected population
Year	Population	Remark
1981	8464	Past growth trends
1991	11464	Past growth trends
2001	20523	Past growth trends
2011	30039	Past growth trends
2015	33828	Projected growth trends .
2020	39297	Projected growth trends .
2025	45581	Projected growth trends .
2030	52679	Projected growth trends .
2035	60592	Projected growth trends .
2040	69319	Projected growth trends .

== Sex Ratio ==
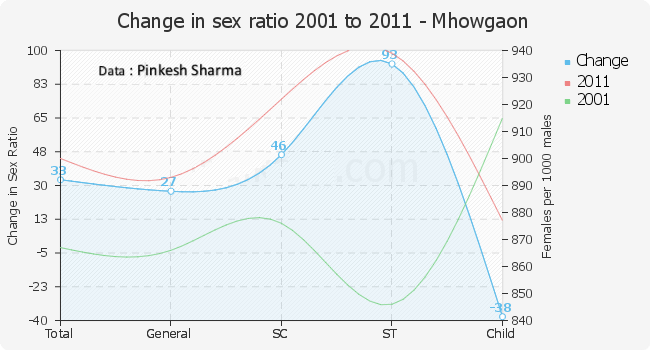
Change in sex ratio 2001 to 2011

In Mhowgaon Nagar Panchayat, the female sex ratio is 900 against the state average of 931. Sex ratio in general caste is 893, in schedule caste is 922 and in schedule tribe is 939. There are 877 girls under 6 years of age per 1000 boys of the same age in the city. Overall sex ratio in the city has increased by 33 females per 1000 male during the years from 2001 to 2011. Moreover, the child sex ratio in Mhowgaon is around 877 compared to Madhya Pradesh state average of 918, the child sex ratio here has decreased by 38 girls per 1000 boys during the same time. Female Sex ratio per 1000 male in Hindus are 900 in Muslims are 892.

=== Change in sex ratio 2001 to 2011 ===
	Total	General	SC	ST	Child
Change	33	27	46	93	-38
2011	900	893	922	939	877
2001	867	866	876	846	915

== Literacy ==
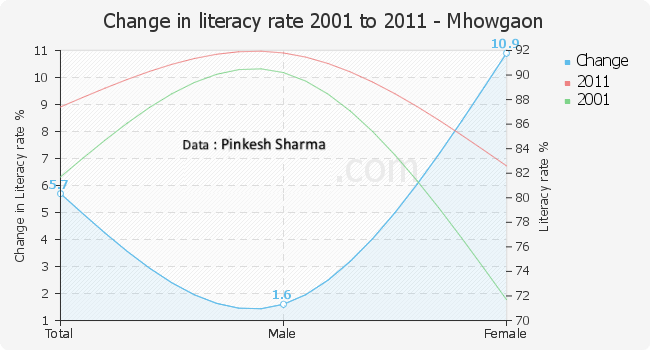
Change-in-literacy-rate-2001-to-2011-mhowgaon

The literacy rate of Mhowgaon city is 87.40% higher than both the state average of 69.32% and the national average of 74.04%. More than 26 thousand people in the city are literate, among them around 14.5 thousand are male and around 11.6 thousand are female, male literacy is 91.75%, and female literacy is 82.58%. In Mhowgaon, 17% of the population is under 6 years of age. Overall literacy rate in the city has increased by 5%. male literacy has gone up by 2% and the female literacy rate has gone up by 11%.

=== Change in literacy rate 2001 to 2011 ===
	Total	Male	Female
2011	87.4%	91.8%	82.6%
2001	81.7%	90.2%	71.7%
Change	5.7%	1.6%	10.9%

== Workers profile ==
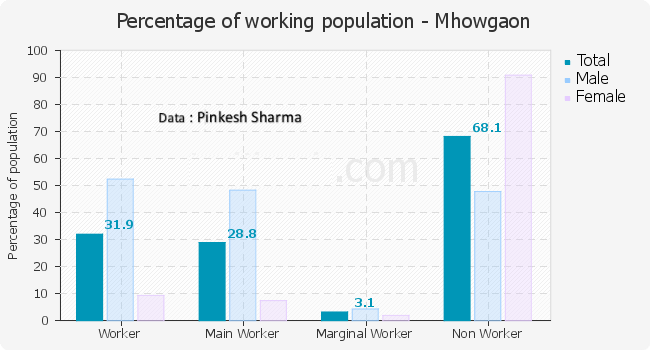
Percentage-of-working-population-mhowgaon

Mhowgaon has 32% (9571) population engaged in either main or marginal works. 52% male and 9% female population are working population. 48% of total male population are main (full time) workers and 4% are marginal (part-time) workers. For women 7% of the total female population are main and 2% are marginal workers. Out of the total population, 9,571 were engaged in work or business activity. Of this 8,267 were males while 1,304 were females. In a census survey, a worker is defined as a person who does business, job, service, and cultivator and labour activity. Of total 9571 working population, 90.42% were engaged in Main Work while 9.58% of total workers were engaged in Marginal Work.

=== Percentage of working population ===
	Worker	Main Worker	Marginal Worker	Non Worker
Total	31.9%	28.8%	3.1%	68.1%
Male	52.3%	48.2%	4.2%	47.7%
Female	9.2%	7.3%	1.8%	90.8%

== Colony divisions ==
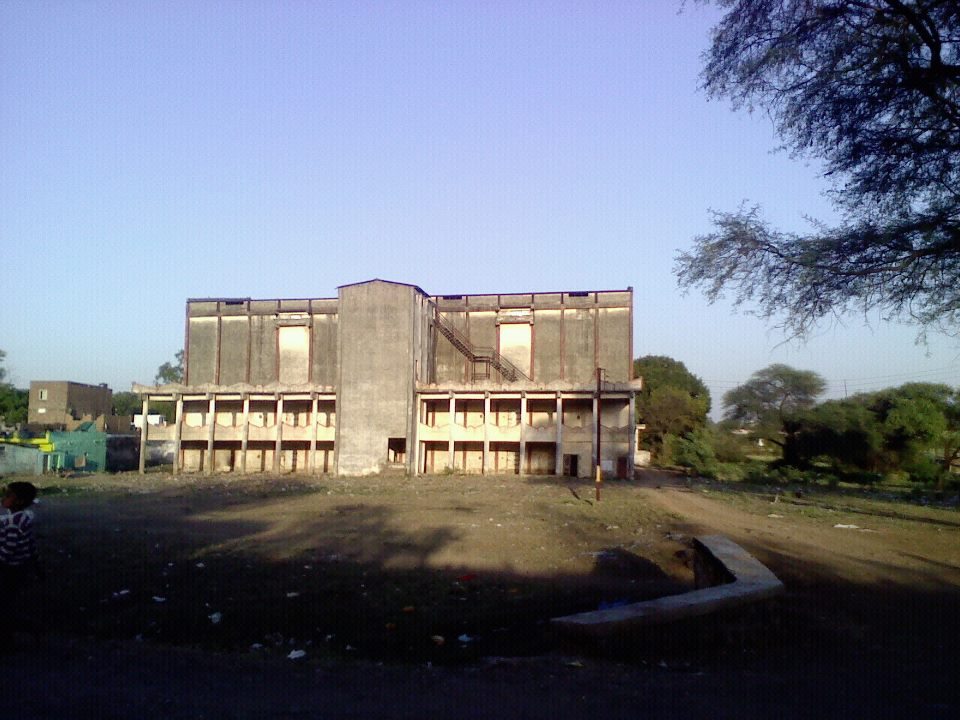
Cold Storage near Kankarpura

As of 2011 It has many important colonies build up during present
1) Suman Colony
2) Annapurna colony
3) Hari Nagar
4) Shri nath
5) Khatipura
6) Bajrang mohalla
7) Bhagwati vihar
8) Tehsil Colony
9) Maruti nagar
10) Shanti Nagar
11) South Shanti Nagar
12) Shiv Nagar Colony
13) Bhagirath Colony
14) Shri Raam Nagar
15) Shri Raam Nagar (Aashiyana)
16) Kankar Pura
17) Gaikawad
18) Diamond Colony
19) Super City
20) Utkarsh Vihar
21) Madan Vihar
22) Sai City
23) Samriddhi Vihar
24) Goswami Residency

== Climate ==
Mhowgaon has a borderline humid subtropical climate (Köppen climate classification Cwa) and tropical savanna climate (Aw). Three distinct seasons are observed: summer, monsoon and winter.

Summers start in mid-March and can be extremely hot in April and May. The daytime temperatures can touch 48 °C (118 °F) on more than one occasion. Average summer temperatures may go as high as 40 °C (104 °F) but humidity is very low.

Winters are moderate and usually dry. Lower temperatures can go as low as 2 °C (36 °F)-6 °C (43 °F) on some nights. Usually the temperature ranges between 8 and 26 °C during winters.

Rains are due to southwest monsoons. The typical monsoon season goes from 15 June till mid-September, contributing 32–35 inches of annual rains. 95% of rains occur during the monsoon season.

Mhowgaon gets moderate rainfall of 185 to 360 millimetres (7.3 to 14.2 in) during July–September due to the southwest monsoon.

Climate data for Mhowgaon (1971–1990)
Month	Jan	Feb	Mar	Apr	May	Jun	Jul	Aug	Sep	Oct	Nov	Dec	Year
Record high °C (°F)	33.9 (93.0)	37.9 (100.2)	41.1 (106.0)	44.6 (112.3)	46.0 (114.8)	45.8 (114.4)	39.9 (103.8)	35.8 (96.4)	37.4 (99.3)	37.8 (100.0)	37.1 (98.8)	32.9 (91.2)	46.0 (114.8)
Mean daily maximum °C (°F)	26.5 (79.7)	28.8 (83.8)	34.3 (93.7)	38.7 (101.7)	40.4 (104.7)	36.2 (97.2)	30.3 (86.5)	28.2 (82.8)	30.9 (87.6)	32.4 (90.3)	29.7 (85.5)	26.9 (80.4)	31.9 (89.4)
Daily mean °C (°F)	18.2 (64.8)	20.2 (68.4)	25.3 (77.5)	30.0 (86.0)	32.4 (90.3)	30.1 (86.2)	26.5 (79.7)	25.1 (77.2)	26.0 (78.8)	25.3 (77.5)	21.8 (71.2)	18.8 (65.8)	25.0 (77.0)
Mean daily minimum °C (°F)	9.8 (49.6)	11.4 (52.5)	16.2 (61.2)	21.2 (70.2)	24.4 (75.9)	24.1 (75.4)	22.6 (72.7)	21.9 (71.4)	21.1 (70.0)	18.1 (64.6)	12.2 (54.0)	10.6 (51.1)	17.9 (64.2)
Record low °C (°F)	−1.1 (30.0)	−2.8 (27.0)	5.0 (41.0)	7.8 (46.0)	16.7 (62.1)	18.9 (66.0)	18.9 (66.0)	18.6 (65.5)	9.0 (48.2)	6.2 (43.2)	5.6 (42.1)	1.1 (34.0)	−2.8 (27.0)
Average precipitation mm (inches)	4 (0.2)	3 (0.1)	1 (0.0)	3 (0.1)	11 (0.4)	136 (5.4)	279 (11.0)	360 (14.2)	185 (7.3)	52 (2.0)	21 (0.8)	7 (0.3)	1,062 (41.8)
Average precipitation days (≥ 1.0 mm)	0.8	0.8	0.3	0.3	1.8	8.6	15.9	18.3	8.6	3.1	1.4	0.6	60.5
Average relative humidity (%)	46	36	25	23	33	58	79	85	73	50	44	48	50
Mean monthly sunshine hours	289.0	275.6	287.6	305.9	326.9	208.6	104.1	79.9	180.6	270.8	274.0	281.3	2,884.3
Source 1: NOAA
Source 2: India Meteorological Department (record high and low up to 2010)
