= Patalpur (census code 482201) =

- village
- Location within Madhya Pradesh Location within India
- Coordinates: 23.645327°N 77.449590°E
- Country: India
- State: Madhya Pradesh
- District: Bhopal
- Tehsil: Berasia

Population (2011)
  - Total: 14
- Time zone: UTC+5:30 (IST)
- ISO 3166 code: IN-MP
- Census code: 482201

Patalpur is a village in the Bhopal district of Madhya Pradesh, India. It is located in the Berasia tehsil, on the north-east border of the Berasia town. It is situated along the Madhya Pradesh State Highway 23, just north of the Berasia town.

== Demographics ==
According to the 2011 census of India, Patalpur has 3 households. The effective literacy rate (i.e. the literacy rate of population excluding children aged 6 and below) is 81.82%.

Demographics (2011 Census)
| | Total | Male | Female |
|---|---|---|---|
| Population | 14 | 8 | 6 |
| Children aged below 6 years | 3 | 1 | 2 |
| Scheduled caste | 0 | 0 | 0 |
| Scheduled tribe | 0 | 0 | 0 |
| Literates | 9 | 6 | 3 |
| Workers (all) | 5 | 4 | 1 |
| Main workers (total) | 4 | 4 | 0 |
| Main workers: Cultivators | 3 | 3 | 0 |
| Main workers: Agricultural labourers | 0 | 0 | 0 |
| Main workers: Household industry workers | 0 | 0 | 0 |
| Main workers: Other | 1 | 1 | 0 |
| Marginal workers (total) | 1 | 0 | 1 |
| Marginal workers: Cultivators | 1 | 0 | 1 |
| Marginal workers: Agricultural labourers | 0 | 0 | 0 |
| Marginal workers: Household industry workers | 0 | 0 | 0 |
| Marginal workers: Others | 0 | 0 | 0 |
| Non-workers | 9 | 4 | 5 |
