= Keetai Dewapura =

- village
- Location within Madhya Pradesh Location within India
- Coordinates: 23.8222651°N 77.3238274°E
- Country: India
- State: Madhya Pradesh
- District: Bhopal
- Tehsil: Berasia
- Elevation: 479 m (1,572 ft)

Population (2011)
  - Total: 286
- Time zone: UTC+5:30 (IST)
- ISO 3166 code: MP-IN
- 2011 census code: 482331

Keetai Dewapura is a village in the Bhopal district of Madhya Pradesh, India. It is located in the Berasia tehsil.

== Demographics ==
According to the 2011 census of India, Keetai Dewapura has 56 households. The effective literacy rate (i.e. the literacy rate of population excluding children aged 6 and below) is 52.16%.

Demographics (2011 Census)
	Total	Male	Female
Population	286	153	133
Children aged below 6 years	54	26	28
Scheduled caste	69	36	33
Scheduled tribe	1	1	0
Literates	121	77	44
Workers (all)	127	80	47
Main workers (total)	91	57	34
Main workers: Cultivators	83	51	32
Main workers: Agricultural labourers	3	2	1
Main workers: Household industry workers	1	1	0
Main workers: Other	4	3	1
Marginal workers (total)	36	23	13
Marginal workers: Cultivators	0	0	0
Marginal workers: Agricultural labourers	30	18	12
Marginal workers: Household industry workers	4	3	1
Marginal workers: Others	2	2	0
Non-workers	159	73	86
