= Patalpani railway station =

Railway station in Madhya Pradesh

Patalpani

General information
- Location: Patalpani, Madhya Pradesh; India
- Coordinates: 22.514°N 75.797°E
- Elevation: 576 m (1,890 ft)
- System: Indian Railways station
- Owner: Indian Railways
- Line: Akola–Ratlam line
- Platforms: 2
- Tracks: 3
- Connections: Taxi stand, Auto stand

Construction
- Structure type: Standard (on-ground station)
- Parking: Available
- Cycle facilities: Available
- Accessible: Disabled access

Other information
- Status: Active
- Station code: PTP
- Fare zone: Western Railway

History
- Electrified: Ongoing

Services
Preceding station	Indian Railways	Following station
Dr. Ambedkar Nagar towards ?	Western Railway zone Akola–Ratlam line	Kalakund towards ?
Location
- Interactive map

The Patalpani railway station (station code: PTP) is one of the local railway stations of Indore district near Dr. Ambedkar Nagar (Mhow) town in the state of Madhya Pradesh. The station consists of two platforms. The platforms are not well sheltered.

Patalpani has been connected to Indore and Khandwa by metre-gauge railway lines officially known as Akola–Ratlam line. It is the nearest railway station used for access to Patalpani waterfall, which is a well-known tourist spot near Indore that is prone to flash floods.

== Connectivity ==
The Patalpani is connected with Dr. Ambedkar Nagar railway station (Mhow) to the north-west and Sanawad to the south-east on the Dr. Ambedkar Nagar–Sanawad meter-gauge rail line. The station is well-connected to Indore Jn. via Dr. Ambedkar Nagar, Mhow.

== Electrification ==
At present, the station is on non-electrified rail route.

== Developments ==
In 2008, the Union Cabinet approved the gauge conversion for the Akola–Ratlam line of 472.64 km. The cost of the gauge conversion would be about Rs.1421.25 crore. The conversion of Dr. Ambedkar Nagar to Sanawad (meter-gauge to broad-gauge) rail line is in progress. Upon completion, it will directly connect Indore to Mumbai.

The gauge-conversion of Dr. Ambedkar Nagar-Patalpani section is underway, it is expected to be completed by March 2024.

== Trains ==
Currently, only a Heritage Train is operating from the station.

== See also ==
- Akola–Ratlam (metre-gauge trains)
