= Haranya Kheri railway station =

Suburban railway station of Indore

Haranya Kheri

General information
- Location: Rau-Mhow Highway (SH 38A), Haranya Kheri, Madhya Pradesh; India
- Coordinates: 22.5853°N 75.7777°E
- Elevation: 567 metres (1,860 ft)
- System: Indian Railways station
- Owner: Indian Railways
- Operator: Ratlam railway division
- Line: Akola–Ratlam line
- Platforms: 2
- Tracks: 2

Construction
- Structure type: Standard (on-ground station)
- Parking: Yes
- Cycle facilities: Yes
- Accessible: Disabled access

Other information
- Status: active
- Station code: HKH
- Fare zone: Western Railways

History
- Rebuilt: 2016

Services
Preceding station	Indian Railways	Following station
Dr. Ambedkar Nagar towards ?	Western Railway zone Akola–Ratlam line	Rau towards ?
Location
- Interactive map

Haranya Kheri railway station (Code:HKH) is one of the local railway stations in Haranya Kheri, a suburb of Indore. The Harnya Kheri station is a Flag Station where signals are not installed. The platform has limited covered sheds with seating.

The station has been revamped with a new station building and a new track. Currently the station has two lines along with two platforms and a foot over bridge (FOB).

== Major trains ==
The following trains have stoppage at the station.

Number	Train	From	To	Type
NA	Dr. Ambedkar Nagar - Ratlam DEMU passenger train	DADN	RTM	Local
NA	Dr. Ambedkar Nagar - Indore DEMU passenger train	DADN	INDB	Local

== See also ==
- Akola–Ratlam (metre gauge trains)
- Indore Junction railway station
- Mhow railway station
