= Lokmanya Nagar railway station =

Railway station in Madhya Pradesh

Lokmanya Nagar

General information
- Location: Lokmanya Nagar, Indore, Madhya Pradesh; India
- Coordinates: 22.691°N 75.847°E
- Elevation: 557 m (1,827 ft)
- System: Express train and Passenger train station
- Owner: Indian Railways
- Operator: Ratlam railway division
- Line: Akola–Ratlam line
- Platforms: 2 BG
- Tracks: 2 BG
- Connections: Taxi stand, auto stand

Construction
- Structure type: Standard (on-ground station)
- Parking: Available
- Cycle facilities: Available
- Accessible: Disabled access

Other information
- Status: Construction – single-line electrification
- Station code: LKMN
- Fare zone: Western Railways

History
- Rebuilt: 2016

Services
Preceding station	Indian Railways	Following station
Rajendra Nagar towards ?	Western Railway zone Akola–Ratlam line	Saifee Nagar towards ?
Location
- Interactive map

The Lokmanya Nagar railway station (station code: LKMN) is one of the local railway stations in Indore City.

Station on the Delhi–Hyderabad metre-gauge line was founded in the 1970s. The station is equipped with one reservation counter. It is a broad-gauge railway station.

== Major trains ==
The following trains have stoppage at the station.

Number	Train	From	To	Type
NA	Dr. Ambedkar Nagar - Ratlam DEMU passenger train	DADN	RTM	Local
NA	Dr. Ambedkar Nagar - Indore DEMU passenger train	DADN	INDB	Local

== Suburban trains ==
The Indore Suburban Railway is a commuter rail system serving the Indore Metropolitan Region. It is operated by Indian Railways' zonal Western Railways (WR). It has the highest passenger density of any urban railway system in Madhya Pradesh. The trains plying on its routes are commonly referred to as local trains or simply as locals.
