= Patalpani, Bhopal =

Patalpani
- village
- Location within Madhya Pradesh Location within India
- Coordinates: 23.8421862°N 77.3525419°E
- Country: India
- State: Madhya Pradesh
- District: Bhopal
- Tehsil: Berasia
- Elevation: 470 m (1,540 ft)

Population (2011)
  - Total: 547
- Time zone: UTC+5:30 (IST)
- ISO 3166 code: MP-IN
- 2011 census code: 482335

Patalpani is a village in the Bhopal district of Madhya Pradesh, India. It is located in the Berasia tehsil.

== Demographics ==
According to the 2011 census of India, Patalpani has 98 households. The effective literacy rate (i.e. the literacy rate of population excluding children aged 6 and below) is 28.12%.

Demographics (2011 Census)
	Total	Male	Female
Population	547	307	240
Children aged below 6 years	138	81	57
Scheduled caste	15	10	5
Scheduled tribe	22	13	9
Literates	115	74	41
Workers (all)	215	148	67
Main workers (total)	13	11	2
Main workers: Cultivators	6	5	1
Main workers: Agricultural labourers	3	3	0
Main workers: Household industry workers	0	0	0
Main workers: Other	4	3	1
Marginal workers (total)	202	137	65
Marginal workers: Cultivators	7	5	2
Marginal workers: Agricultural labourers	182	126	56
Marginal workers: Household industry workers	0	0	0
Marginal workers: Others	13	6	7
Non-workers	332	159	173
