= Sanawad railway station =

Railway station in Madhya Pradesh

General information
- Location: NH 347BG, Sanawad, Khargone District, Madhya Pradesh; India
- Coordinates: 22.1781°N 76.0740°E
- Elevation: 200 metres (660 ft)
- System: Indian Railways station
- Owner: Indian Railways
- Operator: Western Railway
- Platforms: 3
- Connections: Auto stand

Construction
- Structure type: Standard (on-ground station)
- Parking: Yes
- Cycle facilities: No

Other information
- Status: Functioning
- Station code: SWD
- Zone(s): Western Railway
- Division(s): Ratlam

History
- Rebuilt: 2023

Services
Preceding station	Indian Railways	Following station
Nimar Kheri towards ?	Western Railway zone Akola–Ratlam line	Omkareshwar Road towards ?
Location
- Interactive map

Sanawad railway station is a small railway station in Khargone district, Madhya Pradesh. Its code is SWD. It serves Sanawad town and the neighbouring areas. The station consists of three platforms, neither well sheltered. It lacks many facilities including water and sanitation. The station is situated on the Akola–Ratlam line, which is partly under gauge conversion between Dr. Ambedkar Nagar (Mhow) and Sanawad.

After a long break of 7 years between 2017-24 due to the construction activities of aforementioned Gauge Conversion, Passenger Train services have again resumed from the station in March 2024.

== Major trains ==
Presently, only one train operates from the station and is listed as follows:

Number	Name	Type
01091/92	Sanawad - Khandwa MEMU	Local

== Connectivity ==
The station is connected with Omkareshwar Road railway station to the north west and Nimar Kheri railway station to the south-east.

The station is well-connected to Indore Jn. and Khandwa Jn.

== Electrification ==
At present, the station has been completely electrified.

== Developments ==
The conversion of Dr. Ambedkar Nagar (Mhow) to Sanawad, from Meter-gauge to Broad-gauge rail line is in progress. Upon completion, It would directly connect Indore to Mumbai.
