= Akola–Ratlam line =

Railway route in India

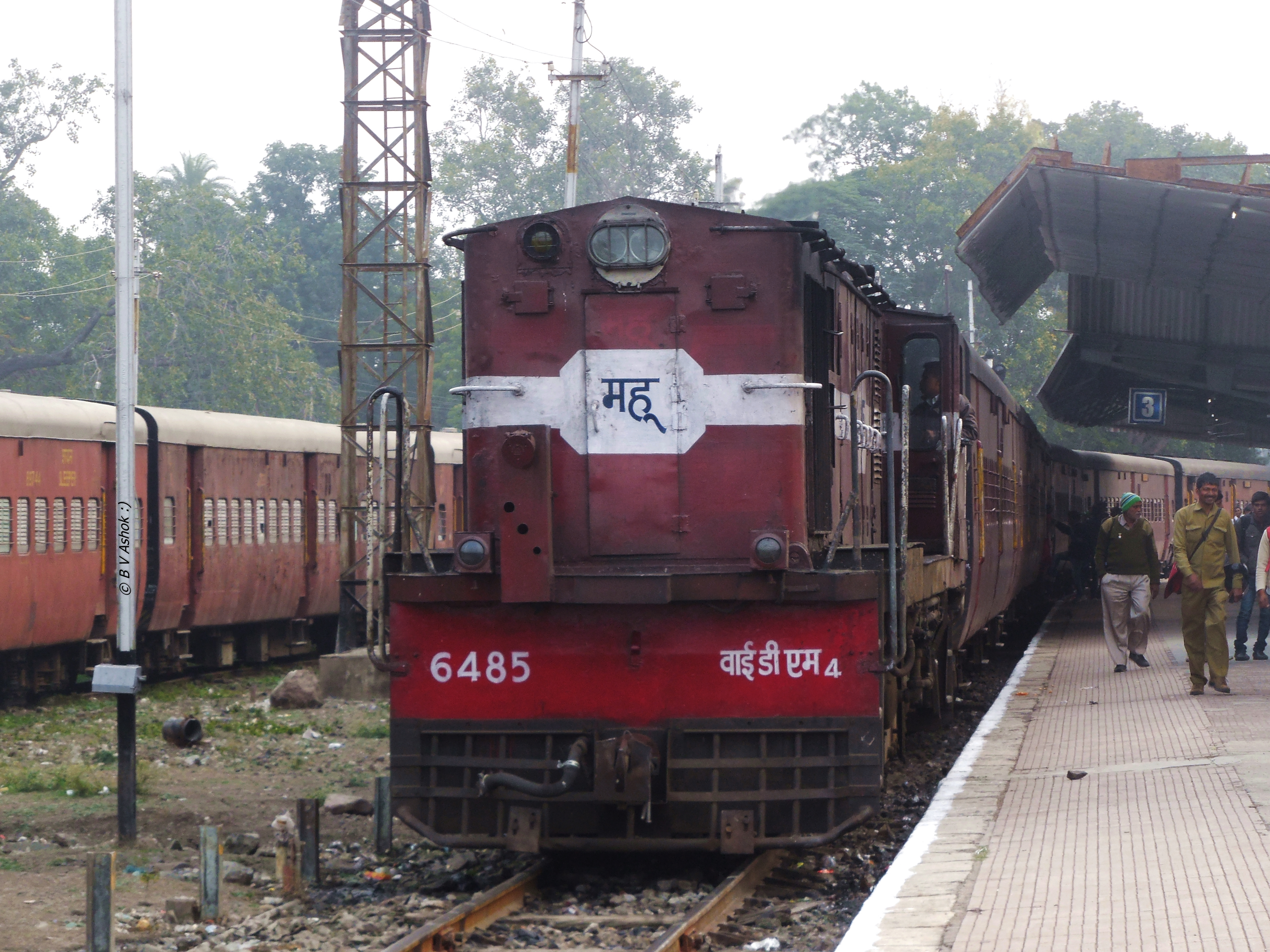
- A Passenger train between Mhow to Indore during Metre Gauge line on the Akola–Ratlam Line

Overview
- Status: Operational
- Owner: Indian Railways
- Locale: Maharashtra & Madhya Pradesh
- Termini: Akola Junction; Ratlam Junction

Service
- Operator(s): Western Railway; Central Railway; South Central Railway
- Depot(s): Mhow, Ratlam
- Rolling stock: YDM-4, WDM-2, WDM-3A, WDG-3A, WDG-3C

History
- Opened: 1963

Technical
- Track length: 473 km (294 mi)
- Track gauge: 5 ft 6 in (1,676 mm) broad gauge
- Electrification: 25 kV AC, 50 Hz, overhead catenary
- Operating speed: 130 km/h

The Akola–Ratlam rail line is a railway line in India linking Akola in Maharashtra with Ratlam in Madhya Pradesh.

== History ==
The Holkar State Railway was established in 1874 as a metre-gauge line originating from the Great Indian Peninsula Railway (GIPR) station at Khandwa and extending northwards. The railway reached Indore in 1876 following the completion of the Holkar–Narmada Bridge across the Narmada River. The line had a total length of 138 km. The railway was financed by the Maharaja of Indore Tukojirao Holkar II and was owned by the Indore State.

The Dhulghat Spiral is a spiral located on this metre-gauge section at around 2 km from Dhulghat station towards Akola. It is also called चार चा आकडा (cār cā ākḍā) in Marathi, "the figure four"—as the tracks are arranged as if resembling the Devanagari numeral ४ (4).

In 2008, the Union Cabinet approved gauge conversion for the 473 km long Ratlam–Mhow–Khandwa–Akola railway line. As of August 2026, gauge conversion is still in progress. It entails the following three sections (from north-west to south-east):

- The Ratlam–Mhow–Indore–Khandwa section—under-conversion with targetted completion by 2027–28 (31 March 2028). Environmental approval for this has been granted. Only Indore-Khandwa section remains incomplete, rest has been already converted.
- The Khandwa–Amlakhurd section—completed in 2020. After the Mathela–Nimarkhedi–NTPC Khargone section was converted to broad gauge on 12 August 2019 and electrified on 15 March 2020.
- The Amlakhurd–Jalgaon Jamod–Akot section—under-conversion via greenfield alignment bypassing the Melghat Tiger Reserve with targetted completion by 2026-27 (31 March 2027). Since the Akot–Amlakhurd section of the line passes through Melghat Tiger Reserve which has around 50-55 tigers, the conversion of this line was held up for several years due to the pending clearance from the Ministry of Environment, Forest and Climate Change. Finally, approval was granted in August 2024 when conversion of the existing Akot–Amalkhurd metre gauge line via Patalpani–Kalakund–Balwada–Chaural was abandoned and instead a new alignment between Akot–Amalkhurd was finalised which bypasses the tiger reserve. This new 77-78 km line alignment which is 30-32 km longer than the original alignment entails a 7 km long 30 metre deep tunnel. Once converted this line will provide shortest route from Northwest India and North India to South India and Southeast India. The targetted completion date, as of July 2025 is FY 2026-27 (31 March 2027). New alignment passes through Hiwarkhed, Sonala, Jalgaon Jamod, and Usami.
- The Akot–Akola Junction section—completed in 2020. This section of the line gauge conversion project was completed on 28 July 2020.

Parts of the Akola–Ratlam line conversion project to broad gauge were complete except the two remaining sections, the Mhow–Indore–Khandwa section (targetted completion of 31 March 2028 as of November 2025) in the north and the Amlakhurd–Jalgaon Jamod–Akot section (targetted completion of 31 March 2027 as of July 2025) in the south, both of which received wildlife and forests approval in July–August 2024 with a new longer alignment.

== Patalpani–Kalakund Heritage Train ==
While the route is undergoing conversion and electrification, a section of the original alignment between Patalpani and Kalakund was preserved as a metre-gauge heritage line. To maintain seamless rail connectivity, a parallel electrified broad-gauge track was constructed between these stations.

The Patalpani–Kalakund heritage train runs on the old 9.5 km long meter-gauge section of Mhow–Khandwa rail line along the original alignment which has been preserved as a heritage train after a new greenfield alignment was used for the Akola–Ratlam line's conversion to broad-gauge. The Patalpani–Kalakund meter gauge line, in the southern suburban mountains of Mhow city between the Patalpani waterfall and Kalakund tourist camp, is now operated for tourists similar to the mountain heritage lines of the Indian Railways even though it still awaits official certification by the Railway Board as of August 2025.

== Loco Shed ==
Mhow Diesel Loco Shed and Ratlam Diesel Loco Shed are loco sheds on this line. These were earlier metre-gauge sheds but have since then been converted to broad-gauge sheds.

== Trains ==
- Ajmer–Hyderabad Meenakshi Express
- Mhow–Indore Passenger
- Indore–Dr. Ambedkar Nagar DEMU
- Ratlam–Laxmibai Nagar DEMU
- Indore–Ratlam DEMU
- Jodhpur–Indore Express
- Dr. Ambedkar Nagar–Sanawad Passenger
- Rewa–Dr. Ambedkar Nagar Express

== See also ==
- Indore–Dahod line, targetted completion date of February 2027.
- Future of rail transport in India
