= Dr. Ambedkar Nagar railway station =

Railway station in Madhya Pradesh, India

Dr. Ambedkar Nagar Mhow
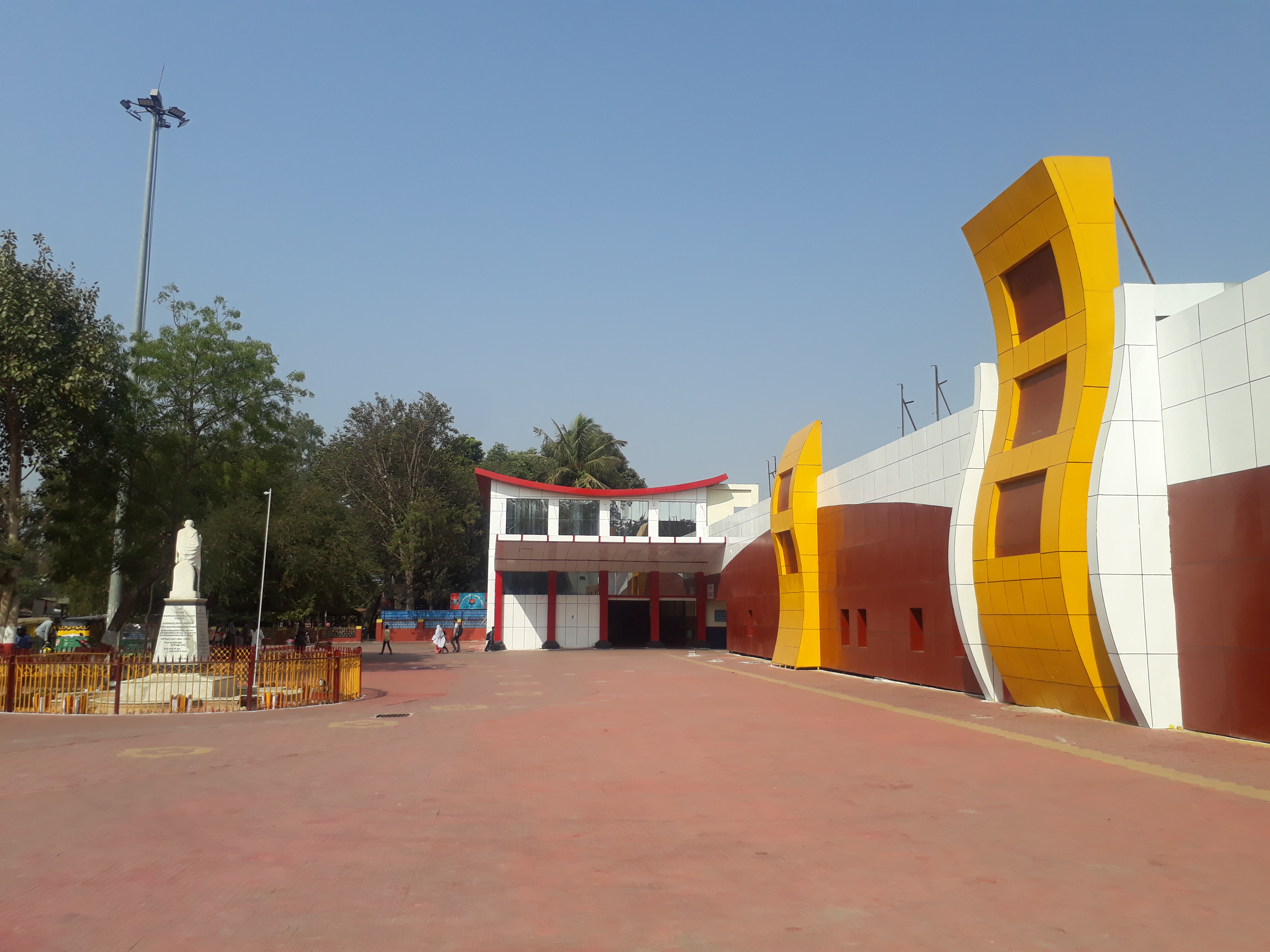

General information
- Location: Simrol Road, Mhow, Indore, Madhya Pradesh; India
- Coordinates: 22.5558°N 75.7707°E
- Elevation: 577 m (1,893 ft)
- System: Express train and Passenger train station
- Owner: Indian Railways
- Operator: Western Railway
- Line: Akola–Ratlam line
- Platforms: 4
- Tracks: 9
- Connections: Indore Metro, Taxi stand, Auto stand

Construction
- Structure type: Standard (on-ground station)
- Parking: Available
- Cycle facilities: Available
- Accessible: Disabled access

Other information
- Status: Functioning
- Station code: DADN
- Zone(s): Western Railway
- Division(s): Ratlam

History
- Opened: 1870s; 155 years ago
- Rebuilt: 2015; 11 years ago
- Former names: Mhow

Services
Preceding station	Indian Railways	Following station
Haranya Kheri towards ?	Western Railway zone Akola–Ratlam line	Patalpani towards ?
Location
- Interactive map

The Dr. Ambedkar Nagar railway station, also Mhow railway station, is one of the local railway stations in Mhow, a suburb of Indore.

== History ==
This station on the Delhi–Hyderabad metre-gauge line was founded in the 1870s. The station is equipped with two reservation counters.

== Development ==
Mhow has been connected to Indore and Khandwa by metre-gauge railway lines. In 2008, the Union Cabinet approved the gauge conversion for the Ratlam–Mhow-Khandwa–Akola railway line. (472.64 km). The cost of the gauge conversion would be about Rs.1421.25 crore. In January 2017, the station was named after B. R. Ambedkar.

== Trains ==
Some of the important trains originating from this station is as follows:

- Dr. Ambedkar Nagar–Kamakhya Weekly Express
- Dr. Ambedkar Nagar–Prayagraj Express
- Dr Ambedkar Nagar - Katra Malwa Express
- Dr. Ambedkar Nagar (Mhow)–Yesvantpur Weekly Express
- Dr Ambedkar Nagar - Rewa Express
- Dr. Ambedkar Nagar–Nagpur Superfast Express

== See also ==
- Akola–Ratlam line
