= Chandan Nagar, Indore =

Chandan Nagar
- suburb
- Country: India
- State: Madhya Pradesh
- District: Indore District
- City: Indore

Government
  - Type: Municipal Corporation
  - Body: Indore Municipal Corporation (IMC)
  - Mayor: Malini Laxmansingh Gaur
  - District Collector: Manish Singh, IAS

Population (2010)
  - Total: 35,000

Languages
  - Official: Hindi
- Time zone: UTC+5:30 (IST)
- PIN: 452001
- Vehicle registration: MP-09
- Lok Sabha constituency: Indore
- Vidhan Sabha constituency: Indore-1
- Website: imcindore.mp.gov.in

Chandan Nagar is a sub-urban locality of Indore in the state of Madhya Pradesh, India.

It lies under the jurisdiction of the Indore Municipal Corporation. The name's literal meaning is Sandalwood.

== History ==
It is composed of 8 sectors designated A to H, with more than 300 houses in each. There are many high schools and madrasas in the locality.

== Geography ==
The Indore International Airport campus borders Chandan Nagar on the Northern end. It is surrounded by Kalani Nagar on the Eastern side. The Sirpur Lake occupies its southern border.

== Politics ==
Chandan Nagar area falls under the Indore-1 Assembly Constituency in Indore District. The current elected Member is Kailash Vijayvargiya from the BJP.

== Transport ==
The nearest railway station is Indore Junction railway station. Public transport such as autos, taxis, magic-vans, city buses are readily available. Bus Routes passing by the main Chandan Nagar Square are:-

S. No.	Route No.	Start	End
1	2	Musakhedi Ring Road	Kalaria

== Places of interest ==
- Sirpur Lake: A Lake, which is a biodiversity hotspot and famous for being the destination of migratory birds during winters.
- Gangwal Bus Stand: An Inter-State Bus Stand for hopping onto buses on NH 47 for Ahmedabad, Dhar, Betma, Rajgarh.

== See also ==
- Azad Nagar
