= Naulakha =

Naulakha (meaning "worth 9 lakh rupees" in Hindi language) may refer to:

- Naulakha, Punjab, a historical village of Fatehgarh Sahib District, Punjab, India
- Naulakha Pavilion, a century-arched chamber at Lahore Fort, Pakistan built for Shah Jahan in 1633
- Naulakha Palace, a ruined 17th-century palace in Gondal, India
- Naulakha Temple, Deoghar, Hindu temples near Deoghar and Buxar in Jharkhand, India
- Naulakha (Rudyard Kipling House) a house in Dummerston, Vermont, built for Rudyard Kipling in 1893
- Naulakha Redux, an album of songs of Rudyard Kipling works, recorded in 1997 by Roberts and Barrand
- Naulakha (TV series), a 2018–2019 Pakistani drama serial
- Vikash Nowlakha, Indian cinematographer

Naulahka

- The Naulahka: A Story of West and East, a novel by Wolcott Balestier and Rudyard Kipling published in 1892
- The Naulahka (film), a 1918 film adaptation of the novel

== See also ==
- Navlakha, suburb of Indore, Madhya Pradesh, India
  - Navlakha Bus Stand
- Navlakha Palace, Rajnagar, Bihar, India
- Navlakha temple, Gujarat, India
- Navlakh Umbre, village in Maharashtra, India
- Port of Navlakhi, Gujarat, India
- Gautam Navlakha, Indian human rights activist and journalist
- Vikash Nowlakha, Indian cinematographer whose credits include Rocket Singh (2009), Brahmāstra (2022), Lost Ladies (2024), Dhurandhar (2025) and Bloody Brothers (TV series)
