= Deepak Jain (politician) =

Indian politician

Deepak Jain (Tinu)
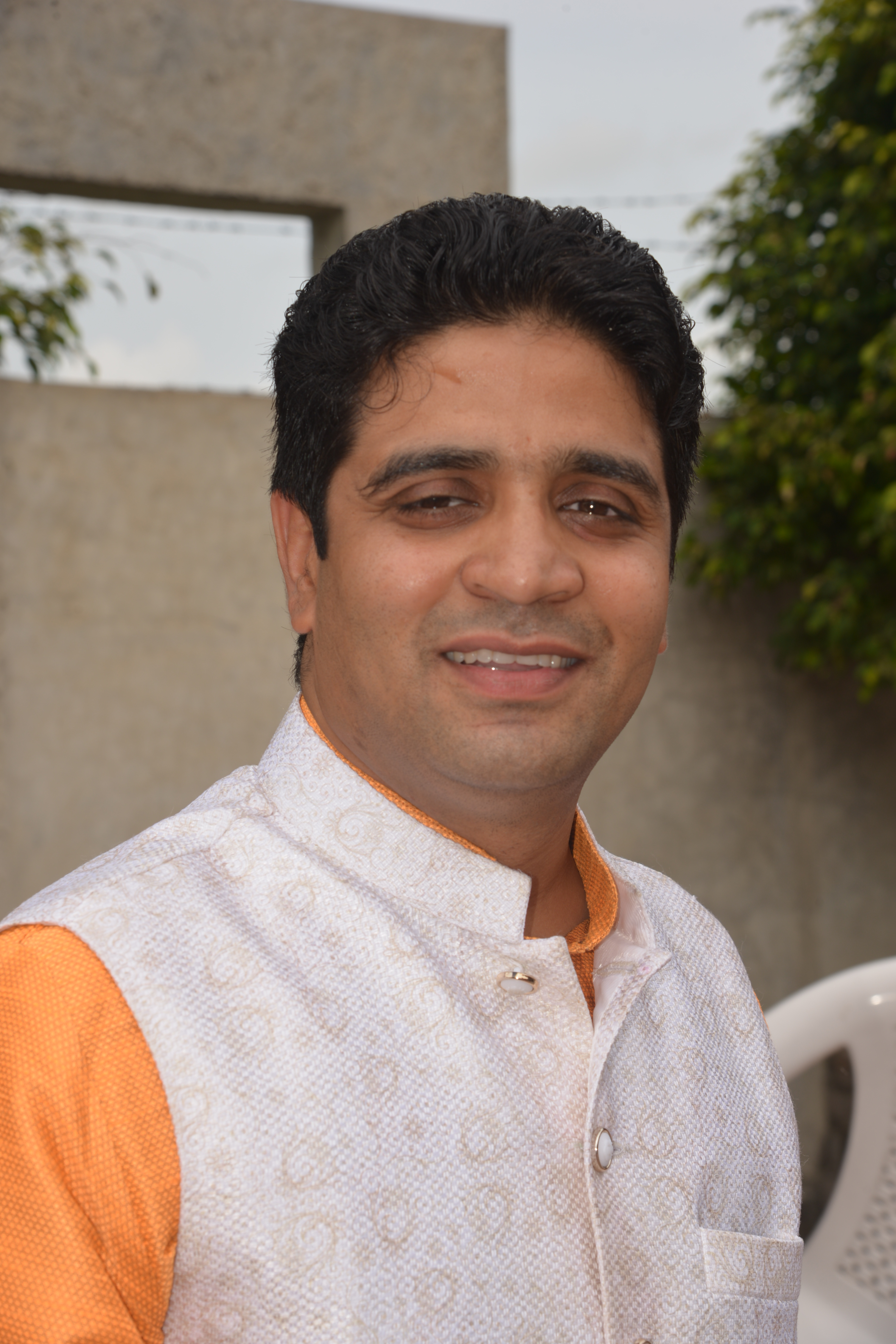
- Tinu Jain

Co-Treasurer of Bharatiya Janata Party – Madhya Pradesh
- Incumbent
- Assumed office 20 November 2026
- Chief Minister: Mohan Yadav
- State President: Hemant Khandelwal

Member of the Indore Municipal Corporation
- In office 20 February 2015 – 2022
- Succeeded by: Sandhya Yadav
- Constituency: Indore–1, Ward–6

Personal details
- Born: 21 September 1979 (age 47)
- Party: Bharatiya Janata Party

Deepak Jain (Tinu) is an Indian politician of BJP from Indore & a former Member of the Indore Municipal Corporation.
