= Deepak Jain =

Deepak Jain may refer to:

- Deepak Jain (cricketer)
- Deepak Jain (politician)
