= Inter-State Bus Terminals =

Indian stations where public buses start or end their routes

In India, an Inter State Bus Terminal or Inter-State Bus Terminus (ISBT) is a bus terminus that provides bus service to destinations located in other states. An ISBT may also provide bus services to destinations in the same state. Mostly ISBT term is used in the Northern part of India. In the Western part of India, Stand or State Transport term is used.

== Andhra Pradesh ==
- Pandit Nehru bus station, Vijayawada
- APSRTC complex Inter-State Bus Terminus, Visakhapatnam
- Srihari Inter-State Bus Terminus, Tirupati
- NTR Inter-State Bus Terminus, Guntur

== Assam ==
- Rupnath Brahma Inter State Bus Terminus, Guwahati
- Inter State Bus Terminus, Jorhat
- Inter State Bus Terminus, Silchar
- Inter State Bus Terminus, Khanapara, Guwahati

== Bihar ==
- Pataliputra Inter State Bus Terminus, Patna

== Chandigarh ==
- Inter State Bus Terminal Sector 17 (ISBT-17)
- Inter State Bus Terminal Sector 43 (ISBT-43)

== Chhattisgarh ==
- Sri Balaji Swami Trust Sri Dudhadhari Math Inter State Bus Terminal (ISBT), Raipur
- Pandri Bus Stand, Raipur
- Hi-tech Bus Terminus Bilaspur

== Delhi ==
As of November 2024, Delhi has three operational ISBTs managed by the Delhi Transport Infrastructure Development Corporation (DTIDC).

- Maharana Pratap ISBT (Kashmere Gate)
- Veer Hakikat Rai Sarai Kale Khan ISBT (Sarai Kale Khan)
- Swami Vivekanand ISBT (Anand Vihar)

== Gujarat ==
- Ahmedabad
  - Gita Mandir(Ahmedabad) GSRTC Bus Port
  - Ranip(Ahmedabad) GSRTC Bus Port
- Surat
  - Surat Cantral GSRTC Bus Terminal
  - Adajan(Surat) GSRTC Bus Port
- Vadodara
  - Vadodara Central Bus Station
  - Makarpura(Vadodara) GSRTC Bus Port
- Palanpur
  - Palanpur GSRTC Bus Port
- Mehsana
  - Mehsana GSRTC Bus Port
- Rajkot
  - Rajkot GSRTC Bus Port
- Navsari
  - Navsari GSRTC Bus Port

== Haryana ==
- Sonipat ISBT, existing: at Sonipat Devilal chowk Sonipat.
- Bahadurgarh ISBT, existing: at Bahadurgarh south bypass in the east of Bahadurgarh near Tikri Border, 1.6 km southwest of Pandit Shree Ram Sharma metro station, 4 km southeast of Bahadurgarh Railway Station on Delhi-Hisar rail line, 13 km southeast of Asaudha Railway Station on Haryana Orbital Rail Corridor (HORC).
- Rajiv Chowk ISBT, planned: next to under-construction metro and under-construction RRTS stations of Delhi-Alwar line at NH-48.
- Kherki Daula Inter State Bus Terminus, planned - announced in 2023 over 15 acres of Sihi village near Kherki Daula toll plaz where Dwarka Expressway meets Delhi-Jaipur Highway NH48. it is located next to the Delhi-Alwar RRTS - Kherki Daula station and Gurugram Heliport Hub.
- Panchgaon Inter State Bus Terminus, planned, located next to the Delhi-Alwar RRTS - Panchgaon station, NH-48 and Western Peripheral Expressway (WPE).

== Jharkhand ==
- Birsa Munda Bus Terminal, Ranchi
- ITI Bus Stand, Ranchi
- Government Bus Stand, Ranchi
- Dhanbad Bus Stand, Dhanbad
- Mango Bus Stand, Jamshedpur
- Naya More Bus Stand, Bokaro
- Inter State Bus Terminal, Deoghar

== Karnataka ==
- Bengaluru
  - Kempegowda Bus Station (Majestic Bus Station)
    - Karnataka (except Mysuru district & Kodagu district services)
    - Andhra Pradesh
    - Telangana
    - Maharashtra
    - Goa
  - Mysuru Road Bus Station
    - Karnataka (only Mysuru district & Kodagu district services)
    - Tamil Nadu (except Luxury Express services and Hosur services)
    - Kerala
    - Puducherry (except Luxury Express services)
  - Atal Bihari Vajpayee Traffic and Transit Management Center (Shantinagara Traffic and Transit Management Center)
    - Tamil Nadu (only Luxury Express services)
    - Andhra Pradesh (only services via Old Madras Road)
    - Puducherry (only Luxury Express services)
  - Krishna Rajendra Market Bus Station (Kalasipalya Bus Station)
    - Karnataka (only Bengaluru Urban district, Bengaluru Rural District, Chikkaballapura district, Kolar district)
    - Tamil Nadu (Hosur services)
  - Basaveshwara Bus Station (Tumakuru Road Bus Station)
    - Current Defunct
- Mysuru
  - Mysuru Central Bus Station
- Mangaluru
  - Managaluru Central Bus Station
- Hubballi
  - Hubballi Central Bus Station
- Dharwad
  - Dharwad Bus Terminal
- Belagavi
  - Belagavi Central Bus Station
- Kalaburagi
  - Kalaburagi Central Bus Station
- Ballari
  - Ballari Central Bus Station
- Hosapete Vijayanagara
  - Hosapete Vijayanagara Central Bus Station
- Yadagiri
  - Yadagiri Bus Station
- Bidar
  - Bidar New Bus Station
- Gadaga
  - Gadaga New Bus Station
- Udupi
  - Udupi New Bus Station
- Koppala
  - Koppala New Bus Station
- Karwar
  - Karwar Bus Station
- Shivamogga
  - Shivamogga Central Bus Terminal
- Ranebennuru
  - Ranebennuru Bus Station
- Bagalakote
  - Bagalakote Navanagara Bus Station
- Vijayapura
  - Vijayapura Central Bus Station
- Kolar
  - Kolar Bus Station
- Chikkaballapura
  - Chikkaballapura New Bus Station
- Pavagada
  - Pavagada Bus Station
- Chikkodi
  - Chikkodi Bus Station
- Gokak
  - Gokak Bus Station
- Indi
  - Indi Bus Station
- Jamakhandi
  - Jamakhandi Bus Station
- Humnabad
  - Humnabad Bus Station

== Kerala ==
- Thiruvananthapuram
  - Thampanoor Central Bus Station
  - KSRTC SWIFT Bus Terminal, Anayara
- Ernakulam
  - Vyttila Mobility Hub
  - Ernakulam Bus Station
- Kannur
  - Thavakkara Bus Terminal
  - Kannur Bus Station
- Kollam Bus Station
- Kottarakkara Bus Station
- Pathanamthitta Bus Station
- Thiruvalla Bus Terminal
- Alappuzha Bus Station
- Kottayam Bus Station
- Pala Bus Station
- Thrissur Bus Station
- Palakkad Bus Terminal
- Kozhikode Bus Terminal
- Sulthan Bathery Bus Station

== Madhya Pradesh ==
- Kushabhau Thakre Inter State Bus Terminal, Bhopal
- Nadra Bus Stand, Bhopal
- ISBT, Jabalpur, Jabalpur
- Gwalior Bus Stand, Gwalior
- Nana Kheda Inter State Bus Terminal, Ujjain
- Shaheed Raja Bhau Mahakal Bus Stand, Ujjain
- Inter-State Bus Terminus, Indore
- Sarwate Inter State Bus Terminal, Indore
- AICTSL Bus Stand, Indore
- Navlakha Inter State Bus Terminal, Indore
- Gangwal Inter State Bus Terminal, Indore
- Teen Imli Bus Stand, Indore
- Nayta Mundla Bus Stand, Indore
- Atal bihari vajpayee ISBT,Satna

== Maharashtra ==
- Pune
  - Pune Station Bus Stand, Pune
  - Shivajinagar Bus Station
  - Swargate Bus Station
- Pimpri-Chinchwad
  - Pimpri-Chinchwad Bus Stand
- Nashik
  - Nashik C.B.S (Central Bus Stand)
  - Mahamarga Bus Stand
  - New C.B.S (Thakker's Buzzer)
  - Mela Bus Stanak
  - Ozar Bus Stand,
  - Sinnar Bus Stand
- Mumbai
  - Mumbai Central ST Bus Stand
  - Jogeshwari Bus Stand
  - Parel ST Bus Stand
  - Dadar ST Bus Stand
  - Kurla ST Bus Stand
  - Boriwali ST Bus Stand
- Nagpur
  - Nagpur Bus Stand, Ganeshpeth
  - Imamwada Bus Stand
  - Wardhmann Nagar Bus Stand
- Thane
  - Vandana Bus Stand
  - Thane C.B.S (Central Bus Stand), Khopat
- Kalyan
  - Kalyan ST Bus Stand
  - CIDCO ST Bus Stand
- Aurangabad
  - Aurangabad C.B.S. (Central Bus Stand)
- Kolhapur
  - Kolhapur C.B.S (Central Bus Stand)
  - Sambhaji Nagar Bus Stand
- Solapur
  - Solapur C.B.S (Central Bus Stand)
- Jalgaon
  - Jalgaon Bus Stand
- Ahmednagar
  - Tarakpur ST Bus Stand
  - Pune Bus Stand
  - Malikwada Bus Stand
- Navi Mumbai
  - Panvel ST Bus Stand
- Amravati
  - Amravati ST Bus Stand
  - Rajapeth ST Bus Stand
  - Badnera ST Bus Stand

== Odisha ==
- Babasaheb Bhimrao Ambedkar Bus Terminal, Bhubaneswar
- Cuttack Netaji Bus Terminal
- Angul Bus Terminal
- Bhawanipatna Bus Terminal
- Jharsuguda Bus Terminal
- Puri (Malatipatpur Bus Stand, Puri Bus Stand)
- Sambalpur Bus Terminal

== Punjab ==
- Shaheed Madan Lal Dhingra Inter State Bus Terminal, Amritsar
- Shaheed-e-Azam Sardar Bhagat Singh Inter State Bus Terminal, Jalandhar
- Bhagwan Valmiki Inter State Bus Terminal, Hushiarpur
- Amar Shaheed Sukhdev Inter State Bus Terminal, Ludhiana
- Baba Banda Singh Bahadur Inter State Bus Terminal, Mohali
- Maharana Partap Inter State Bus Terminal, Pathankot
- Baba Banda Singh Bahadur Inter State Bus Terminal, Gurdaspur
- Shaheed Bhai Mani Singh Ji Interstate Bus Terminal, Sangrur

== Rajasthan ==
- Hindaun City Bus Depot, Hindaun
- Sikar Bus Depot, Sikar
- Sindhi Camp, Jaipur
- Jodhpur Bus Stand, Jodhpur
- Udaipur City Bus Depot, Udaipur

== Tamil Nadu ==
- Puratchi Thalaivar Dr. M.G.R. Bus Terminus (Towards coastal districts via ECR)

At 37 acres (150,000 m^{2}), the Puratchi Thalaivar Dr. M.G.R. Bus Terminus in Chennai, India, is the second largest bus station in Asia. As of 2010, the terminus handled more than 500 buses at a time, and 3,000 buses and 250,000 passengers a day.

- Kilambakkam K.C.B.T Bus Terminus (Towards Southern Districts and operates TNSTC and SETC)
- Madhavaram Mofussil Bus Terminus (Towards Andhra and some TNSTC buses are operated to Salem, Perambalur, Ariyalur, Chidambaram, Cuddalore, Villupuram, Kallakurichi, Puducherry, Kumbakonam and Trichy).
- Kuthambakkam Bus Terminus (Towards western parts and Bengaluru)
- Panjappur Integrated Bus Terminus, Tiruchirapalli.

== Telangana ==
- Mahatma Gandhi Bus Station, Hyderabad
- Jubilee Bus Station, Secunderabad
- Nizamabad bus station, Nizamabad

== Uttarakhand ==
- Inter-State Bus Terminal, Almora Almora
- Inter-State Bus Terminal, Dehradun (Hill Bus Depot), Dehradun
- Inter-State Bus Terminal, Haldwani Haldwani
- Inter-State Bus Terminal, Haridwar, Haridwar
- Inter-State Bus Terminal, Rishikesh, Rishikesh
- Inter-State Bus Terminal, Rudrapur Rudrapur

== Uttar Pradesh ==
- Agra
  - Idgah Bus Stand
  - Inter State Bus Terminal (Agra ISBT), Agra
- Ayodhya
  - Faizabad Bus Depot
- Azamgarh
  - Inter State Bus Terminal Azamgarh (Azamgarh ISBT), Azamgarh
- Gautam Buddh Nagar district
  - Noida ISBT Sector 82
  - Greater Noida ISBT Bodaki
  - Jewar Airport ISBT
- Kanpur
  - Amar Shaheed Major Salman Khan Inter State Bus Terminal Kanpur (Jhakarkatti ISBT), Kanpur
- Lucknow
  - Alambagh ISBT
  - Kaisarbagh Bus Stand
  - Gomti Nagar City Bus Terminal
  - Awadh Bus Stand
  - Charbagh Bus Stand
- Mathura
  - Mathura ISBT
- Prayagraj
  - Zero Road ISBT
- Varanasi
  - Chaudhary Charan Singh Bus Depot

== West Bengal ==
- International Bus Terminus, Kolkata
- Karunamoyee Bus Terminal, Kolkata
- Babughat Bus Stand, Kolkata
- Tenzing Norgay Bus Terminus, Siliguri

== State government bus ==
Many Indian state governments have their own fleet of buses which are run under their state transport department. As per statistics, the State Road Transport Undertakings (STUs) altogether operates 1,50,000 buses. State-wise bus fleet is as follows

Sr. No.	State / UT	Buses of all STU's
1	Karnataka	22343 ▼
2	Tamil Nadu	19989 ▼
3	Maharashtra	15512 ▼
4	Uttar Pradesh	14110 ▲
5	Gujarat	11653 ▲
6	Andhra Pradesh	11193 ▼
7	Telangana	9375 ▼
8	Delhi	6297 ▼
9	Kerala	6241 ▼
10	Haryana	4005 ▼
11	Himachal Pradesh	3302 ▲
12	Rajasthan	2981 ▼
13	Punjab	2818 ▼
14	West Bengal	2232 ▼
15	Uttarakhand	1247 ▼
16	Chandigarh	642 ▲
17	Goa	520 ▼
18	Odisha	437 ▼
19	Assam	405 ▼
20	Andaman and Nicobar Islands	268 ▲
21	Bihar	223 ▼
22	Jammu and Kashmir	221 ▼
23	Nagaland	185 ▼
24	Arunachal Pradesh	164 ▼
25	Puducherry	141 ▲
26	Sikkim	75 ▼
27	Meghalaya	58 ▼
28	Mizoram	49 ▼
29	Tripura	48 ▼
30	Dadra and Nagar Haveli and Daman and Diu	25 ▲
31	Ladakh	20 ▲
32	Madhya Pradesh	Nil ▼
33	Jharkhand	Nil ▼
34	Manipur	Nil ▼
35	Chhattisgarh	Nil ▼
36	Lakshadweep	Nil ▼

== Government city buses ==
Many Indian cities have local public city bus services. Here is a list of fleet of government city buses operated as of now in India cities (million plus population).

Sr. No.	City / Urban Area	City bus fleet of all STU's
1	Delhi (NCR)	6592 ▼
2	Mumbai (MMR)	3928 ▼
3	Kolkata (KMA)	1377 ▼
4	Chennai	3476 ▼
5	Bangalore	5587 ▼
6	Hyderabad	3101 ▼
7	Ahmedabad	1477 ▲
8	Pune	1650 ▼
9	Surat	1136 ▲
10	Jaipur	100 ▼
11	Kanpur	98 ▼
12	Lucknow	115 ▼
13	Nagpur	730 ▲
14	Indore	188 ▼
15	Coimbatore	815 ▲
16	Kochi	20 ▼
17	Patna	131 ▲
18	Bhopal	120 ▼
19	Vadodara	200 ▲
20	Agra	40 ▼
21	Visakhapatnam	615 ▲
22	Ludhiana	Nil ▼
23	Nashik	250 ▼
24	Vijayawada	410 ▼
25	Madurai	460 ▼
26	Varanasi	30 ▼
27	Meerut	30 ▼
28	Rajkot	110 ▲
29	Jamshedpur	Nil ▼
30	Srinagar	Nil ▼
31	Jabalpur	40 ▼
32	Asansol	Nil ▼
33	Allahabad	30 ▼
34	Dhanbad	Nil ▼
35	Aurangabad	135 ▲
36	Amritsar	Nil ▼
37	Jodhpur	Nil ▼
38	Raipur	67 ▼
39	Ranchi	30 ▼
40	Gwalior	16 ▼
41	Thiruvananthapuram	132 ▼
42	Bhilai	50 ▼
43	Kozhikode	100 ▼
44	Chandigarh (CCR)	464 ▲
45	Tiruchirapalli	350 ▲
46	Kota	Nil ▼
