= Ravindra Natya Grah =

Ravindra Natya Graha
- Location of Ravindra Natya Graha Ravindra Natya Graha (India)
- Address: RNT Marg; Indore; Madhya Pradesh
- Coordinates: 22.719°N 75.872°E
- Owner: Indore Municipal Corporation
- Operator: Indore Municipal Corporation
- Capacity: 799
- Current use: auditorium

Construction
- Opened: 1990
- Years active: 1990 - Present

Ravindra Natya Grah is a theatre auditorium and exhibition hall located in Indore, Madhya Pradesh. The theater is named after Rabindranath Tagore who became the first non-European to win the Nobel Prize. It is run by Indore Municipal Corporation and has with the capacity of 799 persons with a parking facilities and also has Hotel Apsara in its campus. Its main venue to host public and private functions, magic shows, dramas etc. in Indore.

== See also ==
- Wikimapia
- City portal at Govt. of India info. website
- Indore travel guide from Wikivoyage
