= Kamla Nehru Prani Sangrahalay =

Kamla Nehru Prani Sangrahalaya Indore Zoo
- Interactive map of Kamla Nehru Prani Sangrahalaya; Indore Zoo
- 22.702°N 75.880°E
- Date opened: 1974
- Location: AB Road, Navlakha, Indore, Madhya Pradesh, India
- Land area: 51.975 Acres
- No. of species: 57
- Major exhibits: Snake House, Mirror House, Children Park, Museum, Butterfly Park
- Website: knpsi.in

Kamla Nehru Prani Sangrahalaya or Indore Zoo is a zoological garden located in Navlakha, Indore is managed by Indore Municipal Corporation. Indore zoo is the only zoo to deploy online booking (https://knpsi.in), animal-health app, and touchless entry system that is tightly integrated with e-Nagarpalika, making it the most advanced zoo of India.

This is the largest zoological garden of the state and one of the oldest zoological parks of Madhya Pradesh spread over an area of 210335 sq m.

Kamla Nehru Prani Sangrahlaya is one of the recognized zoos out of total 180 recognized zoos in India. The zoo has different varieties of animals and birds which have been brought from different parts of world. The zoo's attempts to breed White tigers, Royal Bengal tigers, Gharial, Himalayan bear and white peacock have been successful. Indore zoo is also a center for reproduction, protection and exhibition of animals, plants and their habitats.

== History ==
In 1974 the Indore zoo was established in Navlakha area in only 17 acres land, later on in the year 1999 adjoining 32 acres land of Quadibag was "Acquired" by the zoo so present area of Indore zoo is 51 acres. The total area of Indore zoo is full of greenery where different variety of trees and other plants gives natural feeling of forest to the wild animals.

== Fauna ==
At present, Indore Zoo contains a variety of reptiles, mammals and birds. Herbivores mammal includes Indian elephant, hippopotamus, blackbuck, nilgai, spotted deer, sambar deer, and chinkara.

Carnivorans at the zoo include the Bengal tiger, Asiatic lion, Indian leopard, striped hyena, jungle cat, Indian wolf, golden jackal, Asian palm civet, raccoon, sloth bear and the Bengal fox.

Other species of mammals include the squirrel monkey, Hanuman langur, Rhesus macaque, hedgehog, and the Indian crested porcupine.

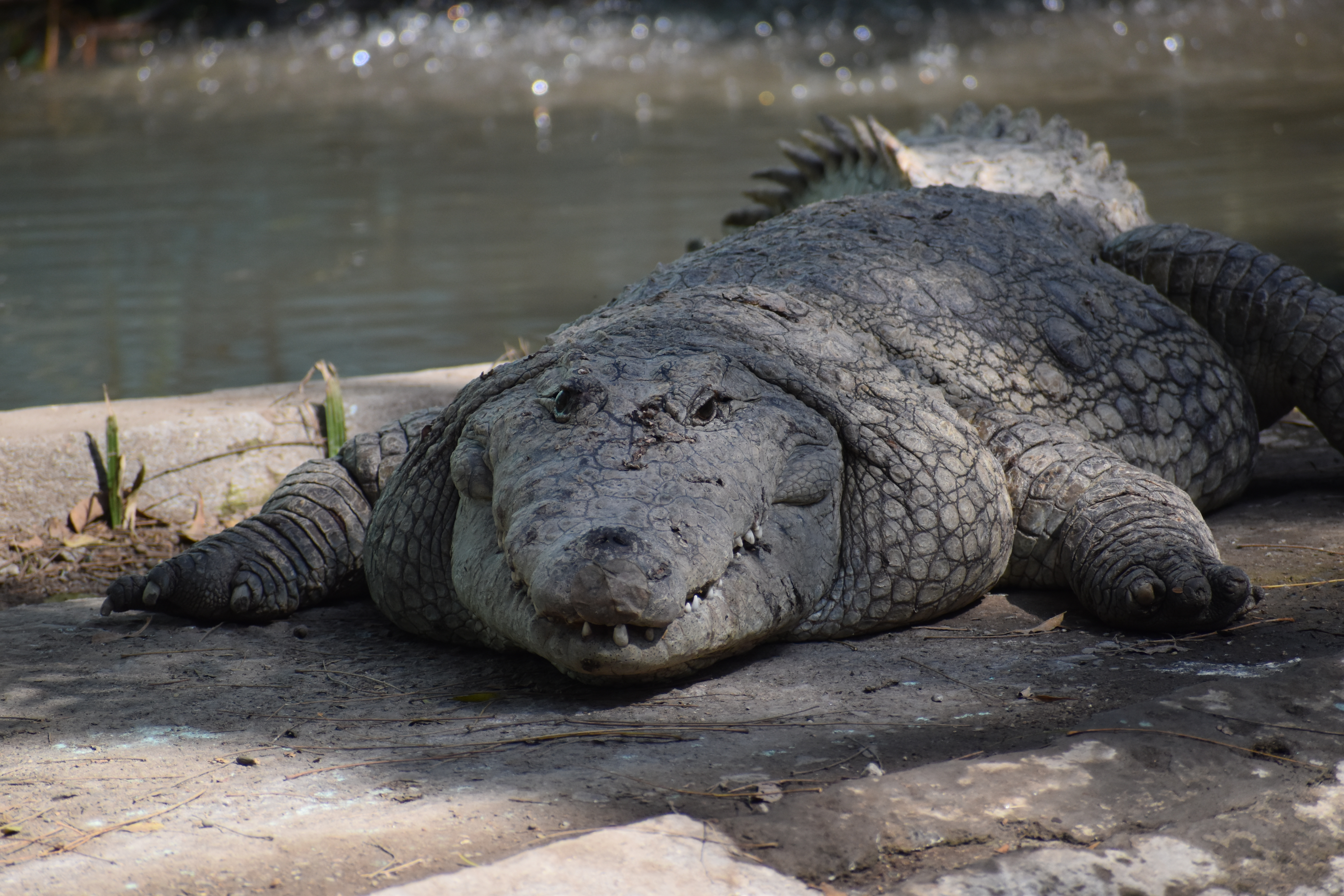
Mugger Crocodile at Indore Zoo

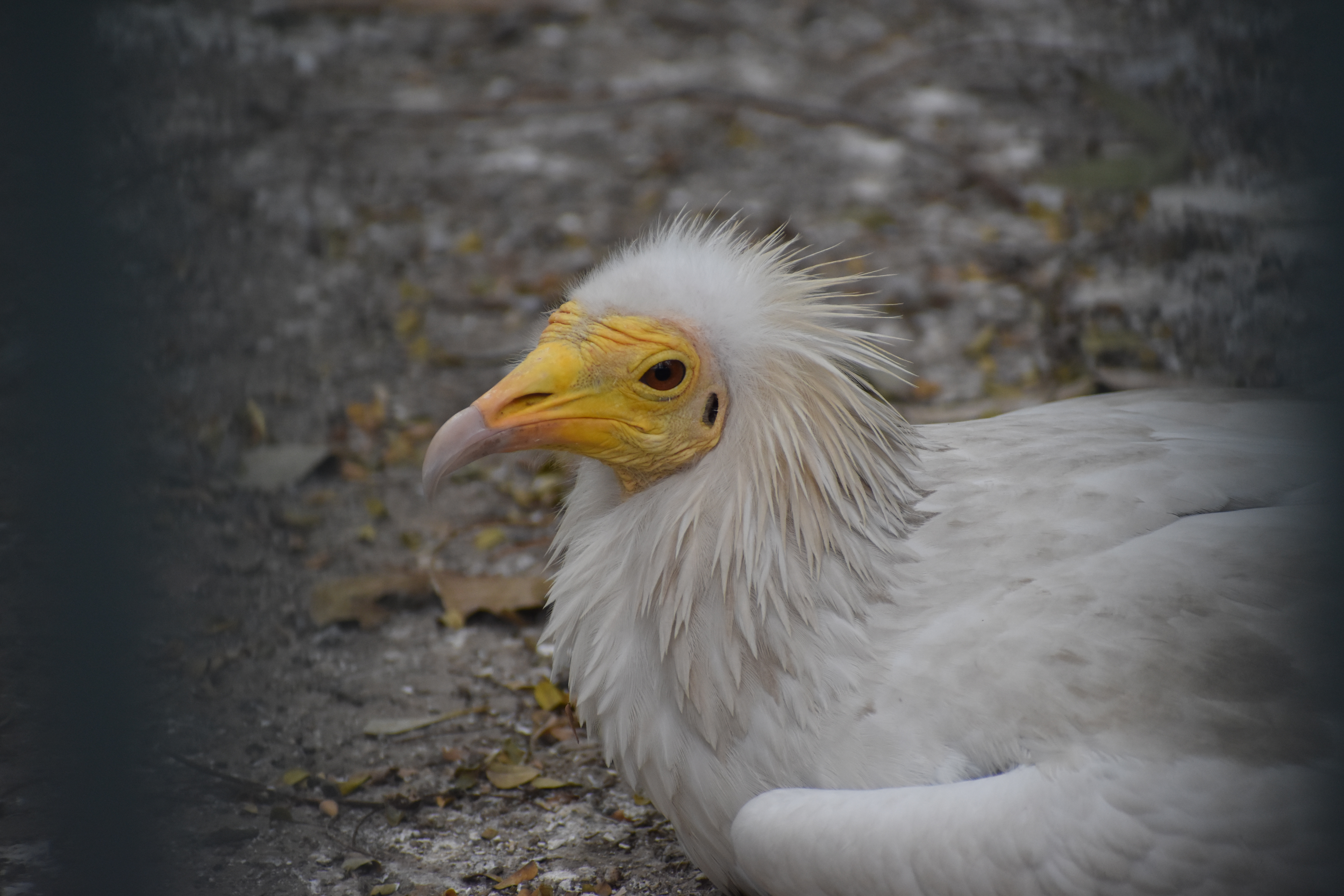
Egyptian Vulture at Indore Zoo

Indore Zoo has a variety of birds like peacock, white peacock, sarus crane, Lady Amherst's pheasant, Egyptian vulture, various species of lovebird, larger ratites like the emu and South African ostrich, barn owl, turkey, duck, helmeted guineafowl, rosy pelican, various species of parakeet, painted stork, black swan and mute swan.

Indore Zoo also houses mugger and gharial crocodiles which are native to Indian Subcontinent.

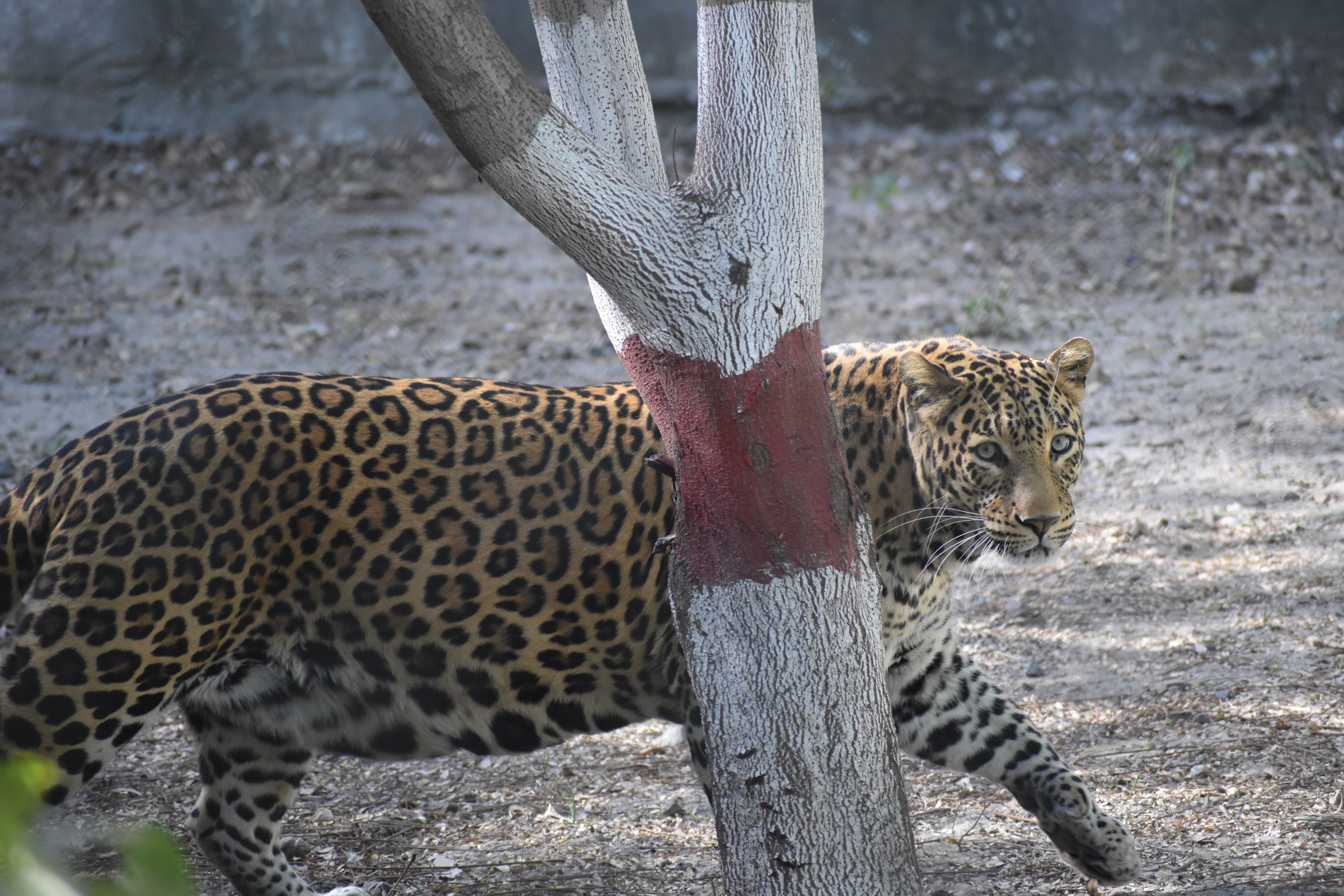
Indian Leopard at Indore Zoo

=== Snake House ===
To boost the number of visitors, Indore Zoo has opened Snake House in November 2019. The idea behind constructing a separate snake house was to provide visitors an opportunity to see and differentiate among various species of snakes under one roof.

Presently there are variety of snakes. Venomous snakes include the member of "big four" (Indian Krait, Russell's Viper, Saw-scaled Viper and Indian Cobra) with Banded Krait, Bamboo Pit viper and Common vine snake.

Non-venomous snakes include Asian rat snake, checkered keelback and banded racer.

Red sand boas, Indian rock pythons, Burmese and reticulated pythons are some of the species of larger, constricting snakes at Indore Zoo.

== India's First Smart Zoo ==
In 2020, Indore Zoo became the first smart zoo of India, featuring touchless entry systems, automated audit reports and governance transparency.
