= Inter-State Bus Terminus, Indore =

Bus terminal complex in Indore, India

Inter State Bus Terminus, Indore

General information
- Location: Kushabhau Thakre Marg, Indore, Madhya Pradesh; India
- Coordinates: 22.768°N 75.861°E
- System: ISBT
- Owner: Indore Development Authority
- Connections: Indore Metro; Indore City Bus; UP roadways

Construction
- Structure type: at Grade
- Parking: yes
- Cycle facilities: no
- Accessible: yes

History
- Opened: Under-construction

Passengers
- 80,000
Location

Inter-State Bus Terminus, Indore (ISBT) popularly known as ISBT Indore, located in Vijay Nagar, Indore is an upcoming Inter State Bus Terminal in Indore.

It is expected to be completed by July 2023. As of January 2024, there was a delay in the completion.

== The Terminal ==
The bus terminal is expected to accommodate a footfall of 80,000 passengers. It will have the capacity of rotation of approximately 1400 buses on a daily basis. It will have ample parking space for 2-wheelers, 3-wheelers and 4-wheelers alike. Furthermore, it would also have a waiting hall with a capacity of 1100 passengers. Availability of basic amenities like ATM, Tourist Help Desk, Guard Room etc. is also expected.

== See also ==
- Indore Junction railway station
- Laxmibai Nagar Junction railway station
- Devi Ahilya Bai Holkar Airport
- Gangwal Bus Stand
- Navlakha Bus Stand
- Sarwate Bus Stand
