= Azad Nagar, Indore =

Azad Nagar
- Suburb
- Location in Madhya Pradesh, India Azad Nagar (India)
- Coordinates: 22°41′52″N 75°53′16″E
- Country: India
- State: Madhya Pradesh
- District: Indore District
- City: Indore
- Ward: 53-Dr. Maulana Azad Nagar

Government
  - Type: Municipal Corporation
  - Body: Indore Municipal Corporation (IMC)
  - Mayor: Malini Laxmansingh Gaur
  - District Collector: Manish Singh, IAS

Population (2010)
  - Total: 75,000

Languages
  - Official: Hindi
- Time zone: UTC+5:30 (IST)
- PIN: 452001
- Vehicle registration: MP-09
- Lok Sabha constituency: Indore
- Vidhan Sabha constituency: Indore-5
- Website: imcindore.mp.gov.in

Azad Nagar is a sub-urb and residential locality in Indore. It is situated at the banks of the Khan River in Indore.

== History ==
The All India Radio Indore Station is located at Malwa House premises in Azad Nagar.

== Geography ==
Azad Nagar lies adjacent to Radio Colony, Residency Area, Musakhedi and Samwad Nagar and borders the Kamla Nehru Zoo, Indore premises.

== Politics ==
Azad Nagar area falls under the Indore-5 Assembly Constituency in Indore District. The current elected Member is Mahendra Hardia from the BJP.

The ward corporator is Foziya Sheikh Alim, who is also the Leader of Opposition in the Indore Municipal Corporation council.

== Transport ==
The nearest railway station is Indore Junction railway station. Public transport such as autos, taxis, magic-vans, city buses are readily available. Bus Routes passing by the main Gol Square are:-

S. No.	Route No.	Start	End
1	2	Musakhedi Ring Road	Kalaria

== Places of interest ==
- Daly College: A premier school of Indore.
- Kamla Nehru Prani Sangrahalay: The Zoo of Indore
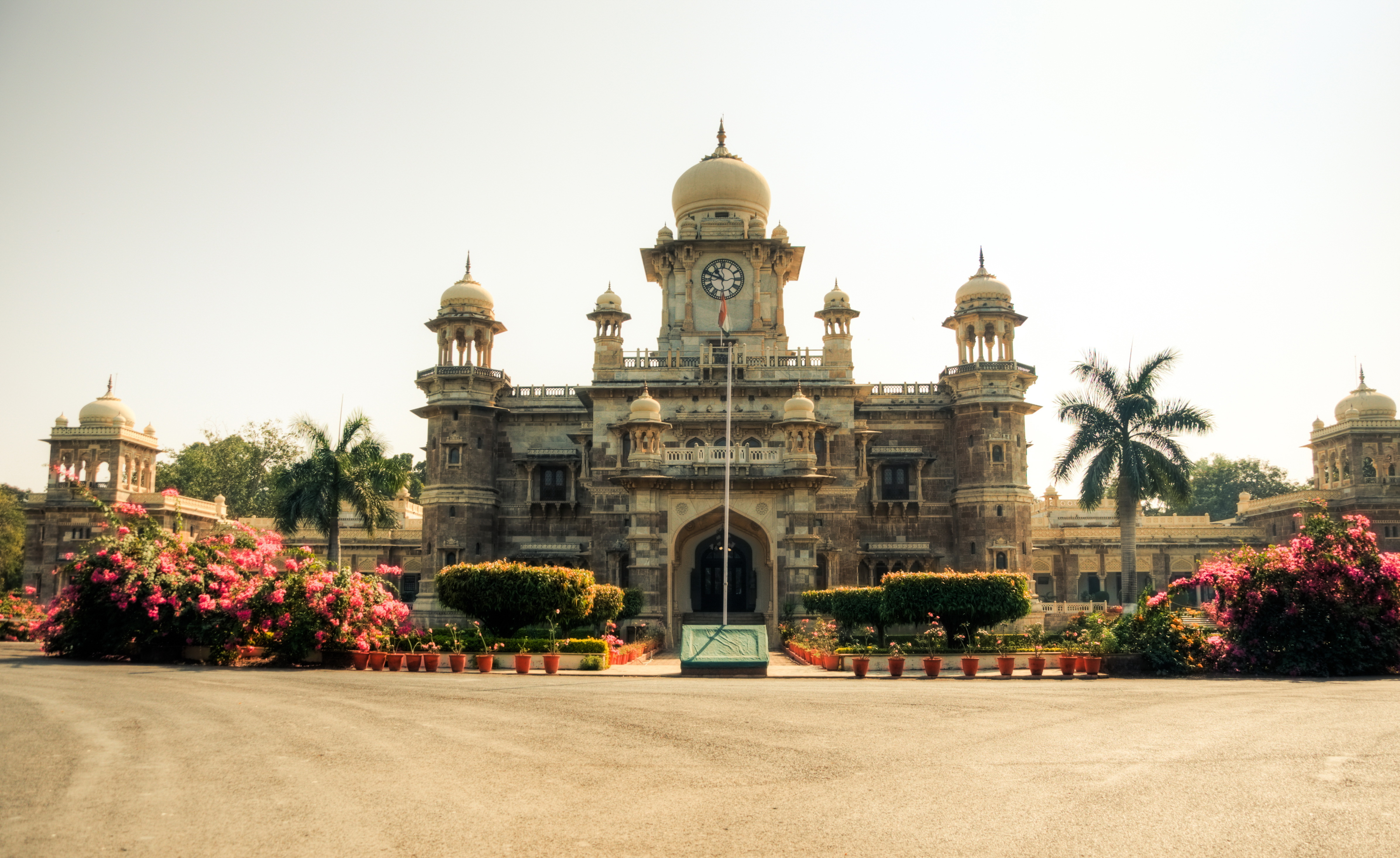
Daly College
