= Sarwate Bus Stand =

Sarwate Inter State Bus Terminus

General information
- Location: Chhoti Gwaltoli, Near Indore Railway Station, Madhya Pradesh; India
- Coordinates: 22.714°N 75.868°E
- System: ISBT
- Owner: Indore Municipal Corporation
- Connections: Rajasthan Roadways; Gujarat Roadways; Maharashtra Roadways; MP Roadways; Private Operators

Construction
- Parking: yes
- Cycle facilities: yes
- Accessible: yes

History
- Opened: 1961
- Rebuilt: 2022
Location
- Interactive map

The Sarwate Inter-state bus terminus popularly known as Sarwate Bus Stand or ISBT, located in Indore is the oldest and one of the biggest Inter State Bus Terminals in Indore. It operates bus services between Indore (Madhya Pradesh) and 5 other states, Rajasthan, Gujarat, Uttar Pradesh, Maharashtra and Chhattisgarh. Spread over an area of about 1 acre, it handles over 1800 buses a day.

== History ==
Sarwate Bus Stand was opened in 1961

== Facilities ==
The departure block, waiting area and food court are centrally air conditioned. Reverse Osmosis plants have been installed to supply clean drinking water to the passengers. high speed, secured Wi-Fi zone allows passengers to remain connected. To keep the building environment friendly a sewage treatment plant has been installed with the capacity of 1000 cubic meter per day. The sewage water is treated and recycled to be used in the air-conditioning plant and for the purpose of horticulture and flushing of toilets. A new parking management system has also been developed which is capable of storing data of buses entering and exiting the premises. high resolution CCTV cameras have also been installed for surveillance.

== Developments ==
The redevelopment of the bus stand was completed in the first quarter of 2022, and inaugurated by CM Shivraj Singh Chauhan on 22 March 2022.

== See also ==
- Inter-State Bus Terminus, Indore
- Gangwal Bus Stand
- Navlakha Bus Stand
- City portal at Govt. of India info. website
- Indore travel guide from Wikivoyage
