= 2022 Indore Municipal Corporation election =

Local election in Madhya Pradesh, India

2024 Indore mayoral election
← 2015	6 July 2022	2027 →
- Registered: 18.35 lakh
- Turnout: 60.88%% ▼1.47pp

Candidate	Pushyamitra Bhargav	Sanjay Shukla	Babulal Sukhram
Party	BJP	INC	Independent
Popular vote	5,92,519	4,59,562
Mayor before election
Malini Gaur
BJP
Elected Mayor
Pushyamitra Bhargav
BJP

The 2022 Indore mayoral election was held on 6 July 2022 to elect the next mayor of Indore. The results of the election were announced on 17 July 2022. Pushyamitra Bhargav of the Bharatiya Janata Party defeated Sanjay Shukla of the Indian National Congress.
