= Satyanarayan Sattan =

Indian politician

Member of the Madhya Pradesh Legislative Assembly
- In office 1980–1985
- Preceded by: Chandra Shekhar Vyas
- Succeeded by: Lalit Jain
- Constituency: Indore-1

Personal details
- Born: 7 February 1940 (age 86)
- Party: Bharatiya Janata Party
- Profession: Politician

Satyanarayan Sattan is an Indian politician belonging to the Bharatiya Janata Party. He was a candidate from Indore-1 constituency in 1980 Madhya Pradesh Assembly election but lost to Chandrashekhar Vyas. A by-election was held the same year and Sattan defeated Kripashankar Shukla, the Indian National Congress candidate.

== Political career ==
Satyanarayan Sattan has been associated with the Bharatiya Janata Party (BJP) since its early years and is regarded as one of the party’s first legislators from Madhya Pradesh.

Over the years, Sattan has remained an outspoken political figure. Media reports have noted that despite being a senior leader, he maintained distance from active party offices for extended periods.

His public statements on political leadership, governance, and internal party matters have frequently attracted media attention.

== Literary associations ==
Satyanarayan Sattan has been an active member of the Shree Madhya Bharat Hindi Sahitya Samiti, Indore, a prominent literary institution established to promote Hindi language and literature. The Samiti traces its origins to initiatives inspired by Mahatma Gandhi and has historically played a significant role in the promotion of Hindi literature in central India.

Through his association with the Samiti, Sattan has participated in literary activities, poetry gatherings, and cultural discussions focused on Hindi literature and social values.

== Awards and recognition ==
In 2025, Satyanarayan Sattan was awarded the Devi Ahilya Gaurav Samman in Indore for his contributions to literature and public life. On the occasion, he stated that he had consciously stayed away from distortions in literature and public discourse.

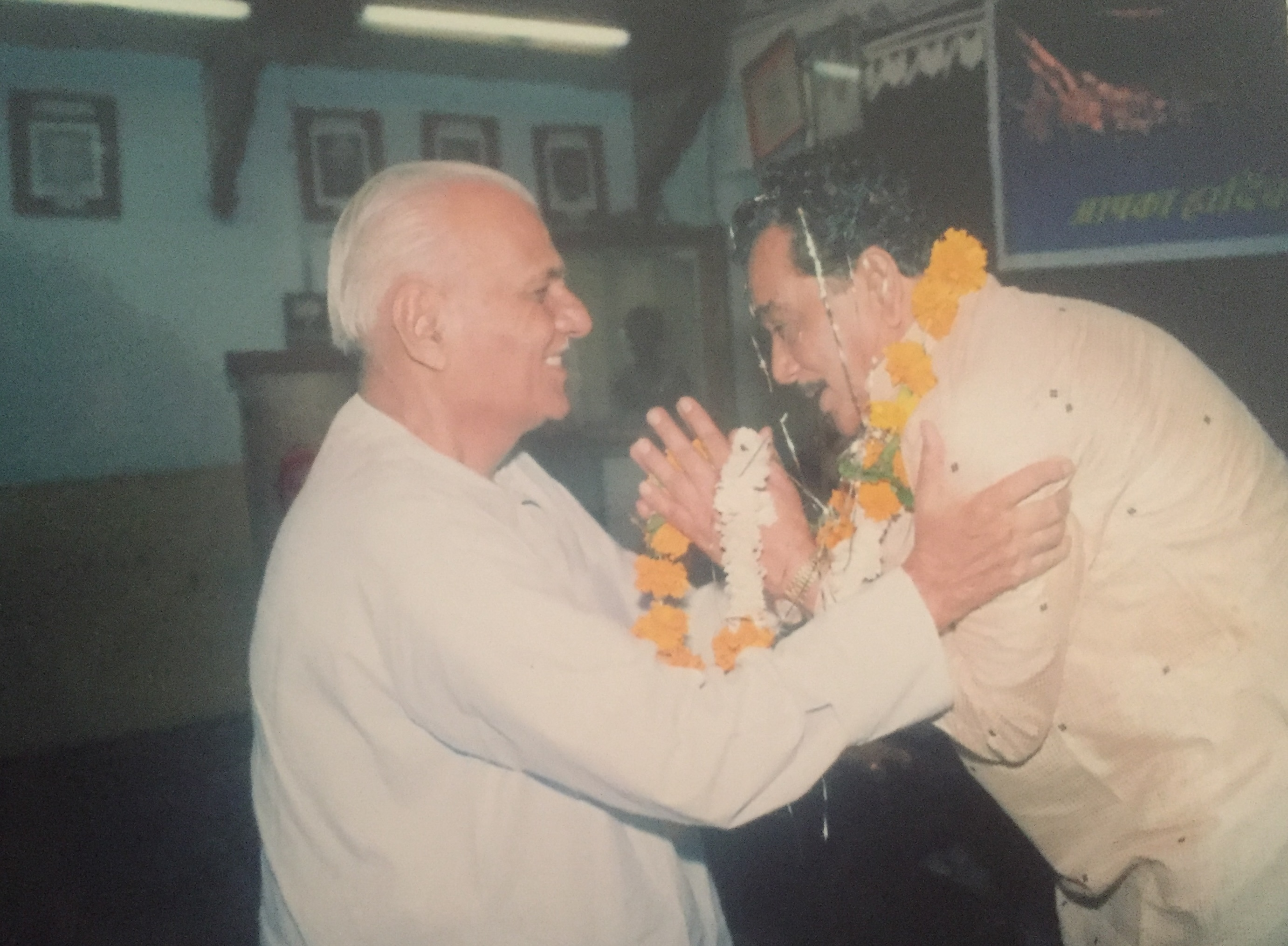
Satyanarayan Sattan with Narayan Prasad Shukla, former Chairman of Shree Madhya Bharat Hindi Sahitya Samiti, Indore.

He has received recognition from various literary and cultural organizations for his work in Hindi poetry.

== Public statements and controversies ==
Satyanarayan Sattan has occasionally been involved in public controversies due to his remarks on political and social issues. Some of his statements have led to political debate and reactions from party leadership.

In certain instances, his comments regarding senior leaders and political conduct have drawn widespread media coverage and responses from government officials.

His remarks on ideological and cultural matters have also sparked public discussion.
