= Sudarshan Gupta =

Indian politician

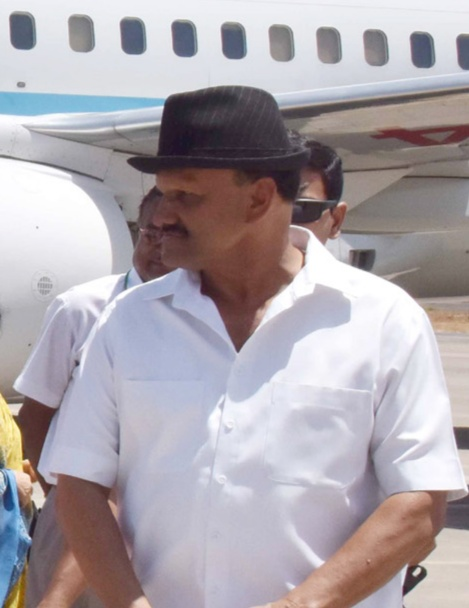

Member of Legislative Assembly, Madhya Pradesh
- In office 2008 – December 2018
- Preceded by: Usha Thakur
- Succeeded by: Sanjay Shukla
- Constituency: Indore-1

Vice President of Bharatiya Janata Party, Madhya Pradesh
- Incumbent
- Assumed office August 2016
- State President: Rakesh Singh, Nandkumar Singh Chauhan

Personal details
- Party: Bharatiya Janata Party
- Spouse: Shankuntala Gupta
- Children: 2 sons- Shubham Gupta also being an active member of the Bharatiya Janta Party
- Education: M.Com, L.L.B.
- Profession: Politician
- Source "MPVidhanSabha" (PDF).

Sudarshan Gupta (born 21 July 1960) is an Indian politician and member of the Bharatiya Janata Party, currently serving as the Madhya Pradesh Vice President to the party. Gupta is a former member of the Madhya Pradesh Legislative Assembly from Indore-1 constituency in Indore. Gupta lost the 2018 Madhya Pradesh Assembly election against Sanjay Shukla of Congress candidate and later congratulated him at his residence.
