= Pushyamitra Bhargav =

Indian politician

Pushyamitra

Additional Advocate General of Madhya Pradesh High Court
- In office 2020–2022

Mayor of Indore
- Incumbent
- Assumed office 2022
- Preceded by: Malini Gaur

Personal details
- Born: Indore, Madhya Pradesh, India
- Party: Bhartiya Janata Party
- Education: Devi Ahilya Vishwavidyalaya
- Profession: Politician, Lawyer

Pushyamitra Bhargav is an Indian politician, lawyer and social activist from Indore, Madhya Pradesh. He is a member of the Bharatiya Janata Party. He is currently serving as the 24th Mayor of Indore following a successful run against Sanjay Shukla during the 2022 Indore mayoral election.

He has also served as the youngest Additional Advocate General of the Madhya Pradesh High Court. As mayor, he requested that shops in Indore display replicas of the Ram Temple in Ayodhya and warned that residents “know how to respond to those who fail to cooperate”.

Pushyamitra Bhargav is regarded as one of the youngest mayors of Indore in the contemporary era, having assumed office at the age of 40 following his election as Mayor of Indore Municipal Corporation in 2022.

Pushyamitra Bhargav is regarded as one of the youngest mayors of Indore in the modern period, having assumed office at the age of 40 after being elected Mayor of the Indore Municipal Corporation in 2022.

In the city’s political history, a notable earlier example is Narayan Prasad Shukla, who became Mayor of Indore at the age of 27 in the mid-1960s, making him one of the youngest mayors in the history of the Indore Municipal Corporation. Shukla later served as a Member of the Madhya Pradesh Legislative Assembly, Deputy Speaker of the Assembly, and Minister of State, and was actively associated with major civic and developmental movements in Indore.
