= Mumbai Central ST Bus Stand =

Bus terminal in Mumbai, India

General information
- Location: Mumbai Central, Mumbai
- Coordinates: 18.969°N 72.821°E
- System: Bus station
- Owner: Brihanmumbai Municipal Corporation
- Operator: Maharashtra State Road Transport Corporation; Brihanmumbai Municipal Corporation
- Connections: Mumbai City Bus

Construction
- Structure type: At grade station
- Parking: No
- Cycle facilities: No
- Accessible: Yes
Location

Mumbai Central ST Bus Stand is an inter-state bus terminal located in Mumbai, India. It is located near the Mumbai Central railway station in the Tardeo area of South Mumbai and it's owned by the Brihanmumbai Municipal Corporation.

== Destinations ==
The terminal provides buses going to different parts inside and outside Maharashtra like Thane, Satara, Kolhapur, Pune, Raigad, Goa, Sangli, Nashik, Dhule, Jalgaon, Aurangabad, Amravati, Nagpur, Solapur, Latur, Nanded, Ahmedabad, Surat, Hyderabad, Bengaluru, Bhopal and Indore.

== See also ==
- Maharashtra State Road Transport Corporation
- Mumbai Central railway station
- Chhatrapati Shivaji Maharaj International Airport
