= Navlakha Bus Stand =

Navlakha Inter State Bus Terminus

General information
- Location: Navlakha square, Indore, Madhya Pradesh; India
- Coordinates: 22.701°N 75.877°E
- System: ISBT
- Connections: RRSRTC, GSRTC, MSRTC, MPRTC, Private Operators

Construction
- Parking: yes
- Cycle facilities: no
- Accessible: yes
Location
- Interactive map

The Navlakha Inter-state bus terminus popularly known as Navlakha Bus Stand or ISBT, located in Indore is one of the three important Inter State Bus Terminals in Indore. It operates bus services between Indore and other cities of Madhya Pradesh, namely Betul, Chhindwara, Hoshangabad, Harda and towns like Bagli, Dewas, Karnawad and Khategaon on the National Highway 47 (India) (NH47) also known as "Nemawar Road" or "Indore-Nagpur Road".

== Facilities ==
The departure block, waiting area and food court are air cooled. Reverse Osmosis plants have been installed to supply clean drinking water to the passengers. A new parking management system has also been developed which is capable of storing data of buses entering and exiting the premises. The bus stand has a slew of hotels, restaurants at hand's reach.

== How to reach ==
The Bus Stand is easily accessible by public transport i.e. Indore City Bus, Indore BRTS and other means such as taxis.

== Controversy ==
The Navlakha bus stand was abandoned in 2016 for the Ujjain Simhastha in 2016 and was shifted to Teen Imli Square nearby which had no facilities and no arrangements. The service from her was restarted on 26 December 2018 after a series of protests by bus operators and people alike.

== See also ==
- Inter-State Bus Terminus, Indore
- Gangwal Bus Stand
- Sarwate Bus Stand
- City portal at Govt. of India info. website
- Indore travel guide from Wikivoyage
