= Birsa Munda Bus Terminal, Ranchi =

Bus terminal in Ranchi, Jharkhand

Birsa Munda Bus Terminal

General information
- Other names: Khadgarha Bus Stand; Kantatoli Bus Stand; ISBT Ranchi
- Location: Netaji Nagar, Kantatoli, Ranchi
- Coordinates: 23.361°N 85.345°E
- System: Bus stand
- Owner: Government of Jharkhand; Ranchi Municipal Corporation
- Operator: Government of Jharkhand; Ranchi Municipal Corporation
- Manager: Government of Jharkhand; Ranchi Municipal Corporation
- Distance: 2 km from Ranchi Railway Station; 8 km from Birsa Munda Airport
- Bus stands: 1
- Connections: Bihar Jharkhand Chhattisgarh Odisha West Bengal Uttar Pradesh Delhi; Private operators

Construction
- Parking: Yes
- Cycle facilities: No
- Accessible: No
- Architectural style: Bus terminus Bus stand

Other information
- Status: Active
- Fare zone: 6

History
- Opened: 13 November 2015

Services
Parking, ATM, Public Toilet, Hotels, Lounge, Waiting Room
Location
- Location within Jharkhand Location within India Location within Asia Location within Earth

Birsa Munda Bus Terminal, popularly known as Khadgarha Bus Stand, is an inter-state bus terminal in Ranchi, Jharkhand. It is located in Kantatoli Colony and it is spread over 18 acres.

The bus stand has many facilities like ATM, public toilet, parking and ticket counters for several buses.

== Destinations ==
The terminal also provides buses going to various destinations like Jamshedpur, Dhanbad, Bokaro, Deoghar, Asansol, Kolkata, Raipur, Patna, Rourkela, Bhubaneswar, Varanasi and Delhi.

== Incidents ==
- On 30 June 2023, nine buses were gutted in fire due to short circuit.

== See also ==
- Ranchi Junction railway station
- Namkon railway station
- Birsa Munda Airport
- Sarai Kale Khan Inter-State Bus Terminus
