= Kushabhau Thakre Inter State Bus Terminal =

Kushabhau Thakre Inter-state bus terminal कुशाभाऊ ठाकरे इंटर स्टेट बस टर्मिनल
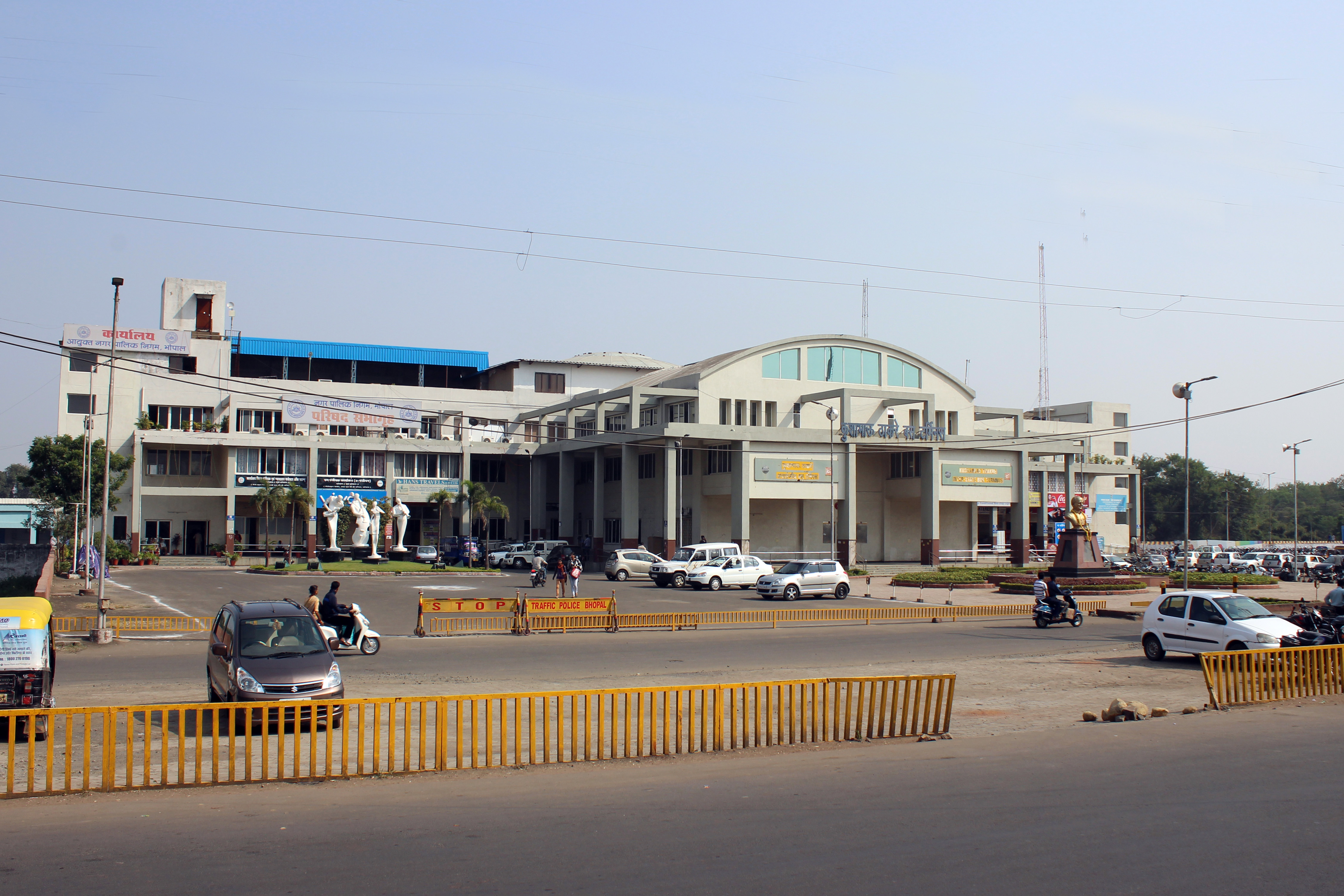

General information
- Location: Opposite Sanchi Milk Plant, Hoshangabad Road, Bhopal, Madhya Pradesh; India
- Coordinates: 23°13′46″N 77°26′34″E
- System: ISBT

Construction
- Parking: yes
- Cycle facilities: no
- Accessible: yes

History
- Opened: 1 November 2010
Location
- Interactive map

The Kushabhau Thakre Inter-state bus terminus also known as Bhopal ISBT or ISBT, located in Bhopal is the newest Inter State Bus Terminals inaugurated on 1 November 2010 in central India. It operates bus services between Bhopal and many cities in India.
