= Kushabhau Thakre Marg =

Route information
- Length: 12 km (7.5 mi)

Major junctions
- North end: Luv Kush Square
- South end: Gandhi Nagar Square

Location
- Country: India
- State: Madhya Pradesh

Highway system
- Roads in India; Expressways; National; State; Asian; State Highways in Madhya Pradesh

Kushabhau Thakre Marg commonly known as Super Corridor (MR10) is a road that connects AH47 Agra - Mumbai National Highway with MP SH 27 and Indore Airport. Kushabhau Thakre Marg is one of the busiest roads of the city of Indore and has become a new hub in the city.

== Connectivity ==
=== Metro ===
The work for the Phase-1 of the Indore Metro is currently in full swing slated to be operational by late 2023. A depot is also being developed near Gandhi Nagar Square.
