= Sinhasa =

- Census town
- Location in Madhya Pradesh, India Sinhasa (India)
- Coordinates: 22°42′20″N 75°46′49″E
- Country: India
- State: Madhya Pradesh
- District: Indore

Population (2001)
  - Total: 4,079

Languages
  - Official: Hindi
- Time zone: UTC+5:30 (IST)
- ISO 3166 code: IN-MP
- Vehicle registration: MP

Sinhasa is a census town in Indore district in the Indian state of Madhya Pradesh.

== Demographics ==
As of 2001 India census, Sinhasa had a population of 4,079. Males constitute 54% of the population and females 46%. Sinhasa has an average literacy rate of 41%, lower than the national average of 59.5%: male literacy is 52%, and female literacy is 28%. In Sinhasa, 18% of the population is under 6 years of age.
