= Navlakha =

- Suburb
- Location in Madhya Pradesh, India Navlakha (India)
- Coordinates: 22.6943506°N 75.8742188°E
- Country: India
- State: Madhya Pradesh
- Region: Malwa
- District: Indore district
- Ward: Chitawad(no.64)

Government
  - Type: Mayor–Council
  - Body: Indore Municipal Corporation
  - Mayor: Malini Laxmansingh Gaur (BJP)
  - Ward Corporator (Parshad): Shrimati Seema Virang (no.64)

Population (2010)
  - Total: 165,000

Languages
  - Official: Hindi
- Time zone: UTC+5:30 (IST)
- PIN: 452001
- Telephone code: 0731
- Vehicle registration: 09
- Website: www.imcindore.org

Navlakha is a residential locality within the city of Indore, Madhya Pradesh, India. The area is named after the famous Navlakha Temple in Indore. Its postal code is 452012.

== Overview ==
Navlakha is known for the Navlakh Temple and the Navlakha Bus Stand which is the origin point for many distant bus services from Indore to Jaipur, Ahmedabad, Nagpur, Pune, Shirdi, Jhansi, Gwalior, Bhopal, Jabalpur, Sagar, and Khurai among others. Navlakha is currently experiencing an increase in the rate of construction for new housing developments and multi-story buildings. Also Navlakha name is given due to presence of Nine (Nav in hindi)- Lakh(Lakha in hindi) mango trees in this area.

== Market ==
Every Thursday, a weekly vegetable, fruits, and fish market is organized. It is locally known as Guruvaariya Haat (Hindi: गुरुवारिया हाट), meaning Thursday Market. Navalakha also contains a saree shop and a number of general goods stores.

== Transportation ==
=== Roads ===
Bhanwarkuan is located on the arterial A.B. Road (NH-3). Autorickshaws, Metro Taxi, City Van, Tata Magic and various private taxis such as Uber, Meru Cabs, TaxiForSure and OlaCabs are widely available. Several City Bus routes serve the area, with fares generally ranging from ₹ 5.00 to ₹15.00. The bus routes passing through and connecting Navlakha are:

S.no.	Route no.	Start	End Place
1	11 (XI)	Tejaji Nagar	Gommatgiri
2	17 (XVII)	Palda Naka	MR10
3	25 (XXV)	Railway Station	IndoRama
4	26 (XXVI)	Indore	Eicher Square (Pithampur)

=== Inter-State Bus Terminus ===
Navlakha has a bus-stand with routes connecting Indore to southern, south-eastern and south-western Madhya Pradesh using the roadways given below:

- A.B. Road (NH-3) Mumbai, Pune.
- SH-27 Khandwa, Burhanpur, Nagpur
- NH59 Hoshangabad, Kampel and Harda
