= Sikar Bus Depot =

General information
- Location: Sikar, Rajasthan; India
- Coordinates: 27.59970°N 75.15052°E
- System: Bus Depot
- Owner: RSRTC
- Operator: RSRTC

Construction
- Structure type: At Grade
- Platform levels: 1
- Parking: Yes
Location

Sikar Bus Depot is the inter-district bus terminal of Sikar city. It is located along with Jaipur road in Sikar. It is Central Bus stand for Rajasthan State Road Transport Corporation. Buses are available for Jaipur, Alwar, Tonk, Jhunjhunu, Churu, Bikaner, Delhi, Haryana, Punjab, Uttarakhand, Gujarat and various other locations.

== Buses and destinations ==
Following are the destinations served by major bus depots:

Bus Depot	Destinations
Anupgarh Depot	Anupgarh
Sikar Depot	Ajmer,Bikaner,Jaipur, Jodhpur, Didwana, Udaipur, Kuchaman City, Churu, Delhi, Salasar, Alwar, Jalore, Pratapgarh, Sanchor, Sujangarh, Ladnun, Nawalgarh,Udaipurwati,
Jaipur Depot	Bidasar, Pilani, Jaipur, Suratgarh, Churu
Jodhpur Depot	Delhi, Jodhpur
Bikaner Depot	Bikaner, Jaipur, Karauli
Beawar Depot	Beawar
Chandigarh transport undertaking	Khatushyamji, Chandigarh
Deluxe Depot	Bidasar, Bikaner, Jaipur, Pilani
Didwana Depot	Didwana, Khandela, Delhi, Jaisalmer, Khetala ji
Dholpur	Dholpur
Ajmer Depot	Kuchaman City, Ajmer, Makrana
Barmer Depot	Barmer, Jhunjhunu
Hanumangarh Depot	Hanumangarh, Jaipur, Sriganganagar
Kotputli Depot	Kotputli
Matsaynagar depot	Alwar
Nagaur Depot	Delhi, Jaipur, Nagaur
Jhunjhunu Depot	Jaipur, Jodhpur, Pilani, Hisar
Phalodi Depot	Jodhpur, Phalodi
Sardarshahar Depot	Jaipur, Kota, Sardarshahar
Sriganganagar Depot	Jaipur, Sriganganagar
Sri Madhopur	Sri Madhopur,Jodhpur,Jalore
Udaipur Depot	Udaipur
Falna	Falna
