= Deepak Jain (cricketer) =

Indian cricketer (born 1967)

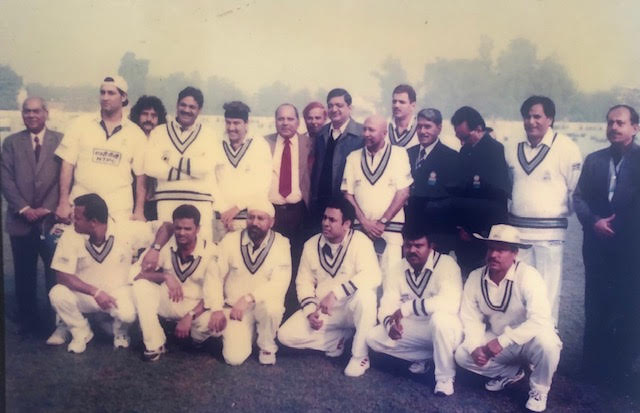
- Deepak Jain India Veterans Match 2005

Personal information
- Born: 17 July 1967 (age 59); Jaipur, Rajasthan, India
- Batting: Right-handed
- Role: Wicketkeeper

Domestic team information
- Years: Team
- 1980–1996: Golecha Gymkhana Jaipur
- 1985–1987: Shivaji Park Youngsters
- Source: ESPNcricinfo, 30 November 2016

Deepak Jain (born 17 July 1967) is an Indian first-class cricketer who represented Rajasthan. He made his first-class debut for Rajasthan at the age of 18 in the 1985–86 Ranji Trophy on 14 February 1986. He is primarily a wicket-keeper batsman who was twice India's standby for the England Tour in 1986 and New Zealand Tour in 1990 and also played for India veterans vs. Pakistan in Lucknow in 2005.

Joined Bharat Petroleum Corporation limited as an officer in 1987 and shifted to Mumbai. There he played most of his career for BPCL, Shivaji Park Youngsters & Rajasthan Club.

== Early life ==
He started his cricketing journey at the age of eleven for the school Tagore Vidya Bhavan, Jaipur. He scored a match winning 37 not out. He has played for Rajasthan in U-15 Vijay Merchant Trophy as a wicket keeper. He set a national record of 5 victims(catches and stumpings) in an innings in 1981 at Nagpur. He represented Rajasthan across various age groups such as U-15, U-17, U-19, U-22, and Central Zone. He also captained Rajasthan University in Vizzy trophy.
