= Gangwal Bus Stand =

Gangwal Inter State Bus Terminus

General information
- Location: Raj Mohalla, Dhar Road, Indore, Madhya Pradesh; India
- Coordinates: 22.713°N 75.841°E
- System: ISBT
- Connections: Rajasthan Roadways; Gujarat Roadways; Maharashtra Roadways; MP Roadways; Private Operators

Construction
- Parking: yes
- Cycle facilities: no
- Accessible: yes
Location
- Interactive map

The Gangwal Inter-state bus terminus popularly known as Gangwal Bus Stand or ISBT, located in Indore is one of the oldest and one of the biggest Inter State Bus Terminals in Indore. It operates bus services between Indore (Madhya Pradesh) and 2 other states, Rajasthan, Gujarat.

== History ==
Gangwal Bus Stand is named after Mishrilal Gangwal, the former chief minister of Madhya Bharat.

== Services ==
The bus stand especially offers buses for Western Madhya Pradesh i.e. Dhar, Alirajpur, Jhabua etc. districts and also towards major cities in Gujarat such as Ahmedabad, Vadodara etc.

== Facilities ==
The departure block, waiting area and food court are centrally air conditioned. Reverse Osmosis plants have been installed to supply clean drinking water to the passengers. high speed, secured Wi-Fi zone allows passengers to remain connected. To keep the building environment friendly a sewage treatment plant has been installed with the capacity of 1000 cubic meter per day. The sewage water is treated and recycled to be used in the air-conditioning plant and for the purpose of horticulture and flushing of toilets. A new parking management system has also been developed which is capable of storing data of buses entering and exiting the premises. high resolution CCTV cameras have also been installed for surveillance.

== News and Controversies ==
Many times bus operators organise a strike as a form of protest.

== See also ==
- Inter-State Bus Terminus, Indore
- Navlakha Bus Stand
- Sarwate Bus Stand
- City portal at Govt. of India info. website
- Indore travel guide from Wikivoyage
