= Karnawad =

Karnawad Kurnawad
- Town
- Location in Madhya Pradesh, India Karnawad (India)
- Coordinates: 22°43′49″N 76°14′30″E
- Country: India
- State: Madhya Pradesh
- District: Dewas

Population (2011)
  - Total: 11,266

Languages
  - Official: Hindi
- Time zone: UTC+5:30 (IST)
- ISO 3166 code: IN-MP
- Vehicle registration: MP

Karnawad is a town and a nagar panchayat in Dewas district in the Indian state of Madhya Pradesh.

== Demographics ==
As of the 2011 Census of India, Karnawad had a population of 11,266. Males constitute 51% of the population and females 49%. Karnawad has an average literacy rate of 62.1%: male literacy is 72.65%, and female literacy is 51.4%. In Karnawad, 15% of the population is under 6 years of age.

== Connectivity ==
=== Road ===
The NH47 i.e. the Indore - Nagpur Highway passes through Karnawad.

=== Rail ===
Kannod has no rail connectivity. The nearest important railway station is Indore Junction railway station.

=== Air ===
The nearest airport is Devi Ahilyabai Holkar Airport, Indore.
