= Rajendra Nagar, Indore =

Rajendra Nagar Bijalpur
- suburb
- Location in Madhya Pradesh, India
- Coordinates: 22.42°N 75.54°E
- Country: India
- State: Madhya Pradesh
- District: Indore

Government
  - Type: Democratic
  - Body: Indore Municipal Corporation

Population (2010)
  - Total: 80,500

Languages
  - Official: Hindi
- Time zone: UTC+5:30 (IST)
- Postal code: 452012
- Telephone code: 0731
- Vehicle registration: 09
- Nearest City: Indore
- Lok Sabha constituency: Indore
- Vidhan Sabha constituency: Rau

Rajendra Nagar is a residential locality in Indore, Madhya Pradesh, India. It is located in south-west part and is one of the greenest localities of Indore. more than 60% population is from Maharashtra & nearer to MHOW (Military Headquarters of WAR) and largest military cantonment in Asia.

== About ==
Rajendra Nagar is one of the semi old area of Indore, some say it as Suburban Indore. According to mouth spreading information it came into existence in the 1960s. Father of Mr. Arun Sharma Kuttewala (residing near Gol Chakkar) was second person to move here after Jayesh Sharma. A Railway station on famous Delhi-Hyderabad Meter gauge line was founded in the 1970s, that was the only source for the transportation on olden times.

IES IPS Academy Main Building

Rajendra Nagar, Indore is known for Institute Of Engineering & Science IPS Academy, Indore which is situated on NH-3. Rajendra Nagar Railway Station is equipped with 2 Reservation Counters with Broad Gauge line. It is mostly a Hindu dominating area of the city. Presently many infrastructure projects are booming up here as in other places of Indore. The area holds 1000–1500 houses in 6 sectors.

== Educational Institutes ==
Schools

- Bal Vihar
- Indore Public School
- Alpine Public School
- Central School (RRCAT)

Colleges

- Indian Institute of Management (IIM)
- Institute Of Engineering & Science IPS Academy
- Institute Of Business Management & Research IPS Academy
- School Of Architecture IPS Academy
- IPS Academy
- Vaishav Law College
- Government Girl Polytechnic
