= Indore-1 Assembly constituency =

Constituency of the Madhya Pradesh legislative assembly in India

Coordinates: 22.725°N 75.826°E

Indore-1
- Constituency No. 204 for the Madhya Pradesh Legislative Assembly

Constituency details
- Country: India
- Region: Central India
- State: Madhya Pradesh
- District: Indore
- Lok Sabha constituency: Indore
- Established: 1957
- Reservation: None

Member of Legislative Assembly
- 16th Madhya Pradesh Legislative Assembly
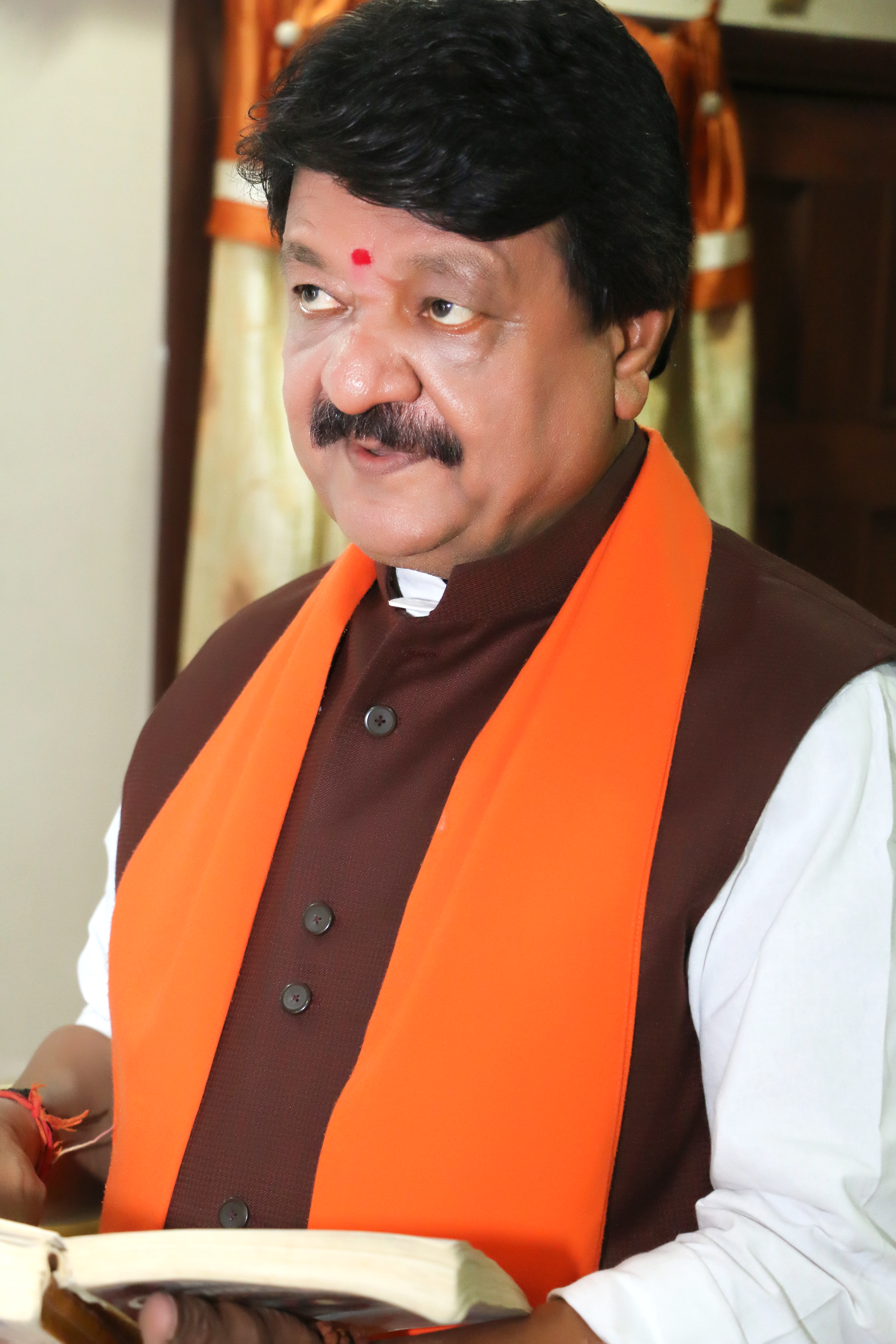
- Incumbent Kailash Vijayvargiya
- Party: Bharatiya Janata Party
- Elected year: 2023
- Preceded by: Sanjay Shukla

Indore-1 Assembly constituency is one of the 230 Vidhan Sabha (Legislative Assembly) constituencies of Madhya Pradesh state in central India.

== Overview ==
Indore-1 Assembly constituency is one of the 9 Vidhan Sabha constituencies located in Indore district which comes under Indore (Lok Sabha constituency).

== Members of Legislative Assembly ==
Year	Member	Party
1957	Babulal Patodi	Indian National Congress
1962	Babulal Patodi	Indian National Congress
1967	Arif Baig	Samyukta Socialist Party
1972	Mahesh Joshi	Indian National Congress
1977	Om Prakash Rawal	Janata Party
1980	Chandra Shekhar Vyas	Indian National Congress (I)
1980	Satyanarayan Sattan	Bharatiya Janata Party
1985	Lalit Jain	Indian National Congress
1990	Lalit Jain	Indian National Congress
1993	Lalchand Murlidhar Mittal	Bharatiya Janata Party
1998	Ramlal Yadav	Indian National Congress
2003	Usha Thakur	Bharatiya Janata Party
2008	Sudarshan Gupta	Bharatiya Janata Party
2013	Sudarshan Gupta	Bharatiya Janata Party
2018	Sanjay Shukla	Indian National Congress
2023	Kailash Vijayvargiya	Bharatiya Janata Party

by-election

== Election results ==
=== 2023 ===
2023 Madhya Pradesh Legislative Assembly election: Indore-1
Party	Candidate	Votes	%	±%
BJP	Kailash Vijayvargiya	158,123	59.67	+13.01
INC	Sanjay Shukla	100,184	37.81	−12.43
NOTA	None of the above	1,384	0.52	−0.54
Majority		57,939	21.86	+18.28
Turnout		264,978	72.81	+3.7
BJP gain from INC		Swing		

=== 2018 ===
2018 Madhya Pradesh Legislative Assembly election: Indore-1
Party	Candidate	Votes	%	±%
INC	Sanjay Shukla	114,555	50.24	
BJP	Sudarshan Gupta	106,392	46.66	
NOTA	None of the above	2,409	1.06	
Majority		8,163	3.58	
Turnout		228,013	69.11	
INC gain from BJP		Swing		

=== 1998 ===
1998 Madhya Pradesh Legislative Assembly election: Indore-1
Party	Candidate	Votes	%	±%
INC	Ramlal Yadav (Bhallu)	55,873	52.07	
BJP	Lalchand Murlidhar Mittal	50,433	47.00	
SP	K. R. Yadav	351	0.33	
Independent	Pavan Mishra	190	0.18	
JD	Bapu Mangilal Boriwal	161	0.15	
Majority		5,440	5.07	
Turnout		107,295	54.44	
INC gain from BJP		Swing		

== See also ==
- Indore
- Indore (Lok Sabha constituency)
