= Sanjay Shukla =

Indian politician

Member of the Madhya Pradesh Legislative Assembly
- In office 11 December 2018 – 3 December 2023
- Preceded by: Sudarshan Gupta
- Succeeded by: Kailash Vijayvargiya
- Constituency: Indore-1

Personal details
- Born: 19 November 1973 (age 52) Indore, Madhya Pradesh, India
- Citizenship: India
- Party: Bharatiya Janata Party (2024- Present)
- Other political affiliations: Indian National Congress (till 2024)
- Education: 12th Pass
- Profession: Politician

Sanjay Shukla is an Indian politician and former legislator from Indore, India. He was a member of the 15th Madhya Pradesh legislative Assembly. He was elected in the year 2018 from Indore 1 constituency. Shukla was former member of Indian National Congress Party.

Shukla was also nominated for the position of Mayor of Indore city by Indian National Congress but lost to Bharatiya Janata Party candidate Pushyamitra Bhargav by 1,32,956 votes. Sanjay along with other leaders joined the Bharatiya Janata Party on 9 March 2024.
