= Indore Municipal Corporation =

Governing body of the Indian city of Indore

Indore Municipal Corporation Indore Nagar Nigam
- Emblem of the Indore Municipal Corporation

Type
- Type: Municipal corporation

History
- Founded: 1870; 156 years ago

Leadership
- Mayor: Pushyamitra Bhargav, BJP
- Municipal commissioner: Harshika Singh, IAS

Structure
- Seats: 85
- Political groups: Government (64): BJP (64); Opposition (19): INC (19); Others (2): IND (2)

Elections
- Last election: 6 July 2022
- Next election: 2027

Meeting place
- Indore, Madhya Pradesh

Website
- www.imcindore.mp.gov.in

Indore Municipal Corporation (IMC) is the governing body of the city of Indore in the Indian state of Madhya Pradesh. The municipal corporation consists of democratically elected members, is headed by a mayor and administers the city's infrastructure and public services. Members from the state's leading various political parties hold elected offices in the corporation. It is the richest Municipal corporation in terms of revenue generated in the state of Madhya Pradesh.

== History ==
Due to lacked planned development in regards to facilities like water supply, drainage, sanitation and waste disposal, the first municipality was constituted in Indore in 1870 and Bakshi Khuman Singh was appointed the chairman.

In 1906, Indore municipality started its own powerhouse and established a new water supply system from the Bilaoli water body. Then in 1912, municipality became the first city in India to have an elected municipal government responsible for the growth and welfare of the city.

After independence, Indore city was included into Madhya Bharat and declared as the first category of municipality by the local government department of Madhya Bharat. In the year 1956, during the re-organisation of states, Indore was included in Madhya Pradesh and in the same year it was declared a Municipal Corporation.

== Governance ==
At present, the municipal area is divided into 19 zones and 85 wards of various sizes and population. As per the provision of Madhya Pradesh Municipal Corporation Act, 1956, IMC has a chairman (Mayor), councilors elected by direct election from 85 wards, 1 member of Parliament, 5 members of State Legislative Assembly representing constituencies within municipal areas. In accordance with the 74th constitutional amendment 25 seats out of 69 are reserved for women.

Pushyamitra Bhargav is the mayor elected in 2022.

=== Wards ===
Zone	Ward Number	Ward Name	Areas Covered	Assembly Constituency	Councillor	Political Group
	1	Sirpur			Mahesh Choudhary	
	2	Chandan Nagar			Fatma Rafiq Khan	
	3	Kalani Nagar			Shikha Sandeep Dubey	
	4	Sukhdev Nagar			Barkha Nitin Malu	
	5	Raj Nagar			Niranjan Singh Chauhan	
	6	Malharganj			Sandhya Yadav	
	7	Janta Colony			Bhawna Manoj Mishra	
	8	Juna Risala			Rukhsana Anwar Dastak	
	9	Vrindawan			Rahul Shyamlal Jaiswal	
	10	Banganga			Vineetika Deepu Yadav	
	11	Bhagirathpura			Kamal Baghela	
	12	Govind Colony			Seema Dubey	
	13	Sangam Nagar			Paraag Jaysingh Kaushal	
	14	Ashok Nagar			Ashwini Kumar Shukha	
	15	Bijasan			Mamta Subhas Suner	
	16	Nandbagh			Sonali Mukesh Dharkar	
	17	Kushwaah Nagar			Shivam K. K. Yadav	
	18	Sant Kabir			Sonali Vijay Parma	
	19	Vishwakarma			Sandhya Jaiswal	
	20	Gauri Nagar			Yashaswi Amit Patel	
	21	Shyam Nagar			Chintu Chaukse	
	22	Pt. Deendayal Upadhyay			Raju Bhadauriya	
	23	Lt. Rajesh Joshi			Veenita Dharmendra Maurya	
	24	Sant Balijinath Maharaj			Jitender Yadav	
	25	Nanda Nagar			Sunita Santosh Chaukhande	
	26	Jeen Mata			Lal Bahadur Verma	
	27	Pashupati Nath			Munnalal Yadav (Chairman Councillor)	
	28	Maa Tulja Bhavani			Jyoti Pawar	
	29	Shyama Prasad Mukharjee			Pooja Patidar	
	30	Sant Ravidas			Manisha Dulichand Gagore	
	31	Maharaj Chhatrasal			Balmukund Soni	
	32	Atal Bihari Bajpai			Rajendra Rathore	
	33	Sukhliya			Manoj Mishra	
	34	Shaheed Bhagat Singh			Seema Sanjay Choudhary	
	35	Lasudiya more			Rakesh Solanki	
	36	Nipaniya			Suresh Kurwade	
	37	Sai Krupa			Sangeeta Mahesh Joshi (Moni)	
	38	Haji Colony			Jamila Usmal Patel	
	39	Nahar Shah Wali			Rubina Iqbal Khan	
	40	Khajrana Ganesh			Pushpendra Patidar	
	41	Kailaash Puri			Pranav Mandal	
	42	Swami Vivekanand			Mudra Vigyan Shastri	
	43	Shree Nagar			Sunita, wife of Dinesh Songara	
	44	HIG			-	
	45	Dr Bhimrao Ambedkar			Sonila Mimrot	
	46	Somnath			Shaifu Akash Kushwaha	
	47	Sardar Vallabh Bhai			Nandkishore Pahadia	
	48	Geeta Bhawan			Vijayalakshmi Gohar	
	49	Tilak Nagar			Rajesh Udawat	
	50	Brajeshwari			Rajeev Jain	
	51	Bhagwati Nagar			Malkhan Singh Kataria	
	52	Musakhedi			Savitribai Chaudhary	
	53	Dr Maulana Azad Nagar			Gauzia Shaikh Aleem	
	54	Residency			Mahesh Baswal	
	55	South Tukoganj			Pankhuri Jain	
	56	Snehlata Ganj			Gajanand Gawde	
	57	Devi Ahilyabai			Suresh Takalkar	
	58	Netaji Subhash Chandra Bose			Mohammad Anwar Qadri	
	59	Harsiddhi			Rupali Arun Pedharkar	
	60	Ranipura			Sunehra Ansaf Ansari	
	61	Tatya Sarvate			Bhawana Choudary	
	62	Raoji Bazaar			Rupa Dinesh Pandey	
	63	Navlakha			Mridul Aggarwal	
	64	Chitawad			Manish Sharma (Mama)	
	65	Sant Kanwar Ram			Kamlesh Kalra	
	66	Sheheed Hemu Kalani			Kanchan Gidwani	
	67	Maharaja Holkar			Priya Dangi	
	68	Bombay Market			Ayaz Baig	
	69	Jawahar Nagar			Meeta Rambabu Rathore	
	70	Loknayak Nagar			Bharatsingh Raghuvanshi	
	71	Dravid Nagar			Harpreet Kaur Luthra	
	72	Lokmanya Nagar			Yogesh Gander	
	73	Laxman Singh Chouhan			Shaheen Sajid Khan	
	74	Vishnupuri			Sunita Sunil Hardia	
	75	Palda			Kunal Solanki	
	76	Bicholi			Seema Solanki	
	77	Bilawali			Priyanka Chauhan	
	78	Choithram			Omprakash Arya	
	79	Sukh Niwas			Lakshmi Sanjay Verma	
	80	Dr Rajendra Prasad			Prashant Badve	
	81	Annapurna			Abhishek Bablu Sharma	
	82	Sudama Nagar			Nitin Kumar Sharma (Shanu)	
	83	Sudama Nagar			Jitendra Rathore	
	84	Dwarkapuri			Gurjeet Singh	
	85	Prajapati Nagar			Rakesh Jain	

== Jurisdiction ==
The IMC area is bounded by the junction of MR-10 and Bypass Road towards east along the Eastern Ring Road, the Kanadia Road up to its junction with the Bypass Road; thence towards northeast along the AB Road and Eastern Ring Road up to the MR-11; thence towards south along the Khandwa Road; thence towards south along the railway line up to its junction with the Sukhniwas Road; up to its junction with AB Road, thence towards south along the AB Road; up to its junction with the last road leading to Rajendra Nagar; thence towards west along the Ahmedabad Road up to Sinhasa; thence towards west along the Airport Road up to Devi Ahilyabai Holkar Airport at its junction with MR-10 (Super Corridor); thence towards northwest along the Depalpur Road up to its junction with the MR-10; thence towards north along the MR-10 up to its junction with Ujjain Road (MDR-27).

== Departments ==
IMC has 13 departments:-

- Accounts Department
- Education Department
- Electrical and Mechanical Department
- Fire Department
- Food and Civil Supplies Department
- Health Department
- Housing & Environmental Department
- Information Technology Department
- Law and General Administration Department
- Planning & Rehabilitation Department
- Public Work Department
- Revenue Department
- Water Work and Drainage Department

== Smart City Indore ==
Smart City Indore
- Date: 3 October 2015
- Location: Indore, India
- Organised by: Malini Gaur (Mayor, Indore); Indore Municipal Corporation
- Website: www.smartcityindore.org

Smart City Indore is an initiative of the corporation to engage citizens of Indore in the process to qualify the city of Indore in the first round of Smart City Mission launched by Government of India. The project is currently into its second stage.

Smart City Indore is an initiative launched by Indore Municipal Corporation, which includes the participation of residents to qualify Indore to the Smart City Mission launched by the Government of India in first round by taking suggestions and feedback from the residents. Indore is shortlisted by the Ministry of Urban Development as one of the 100 cities under Smart City Mission. The project aims to emphasize development in various sectors including Governance, Transportation, Energy & Waste Management, Water Management, Finance, Health & Education, Infrastructure and Heritage. The website and logo of the Smart City Indore program was launched by city mayor Malini Gaur on 3 October 2015.

On 13 November 2015, the British Prime Minister David Cameron announced that British firms will also be helping and funding the project in order to make Indore (along with Pune and Amravati) a smart city.

Indore successfully qualified in Phase-1 of the Smart Cities Mission, it ranked eleventh on the list released by Union Minister Venkaiah Naidu (MoUD) and is one of the first twenty cities to be developed as Smart City. The Smart City Indore mission was widely appreciated for the efforts put by the government in citizen engagement.

According to the latest report created by a team of master students and alumni of urban planning at the Ahmedabad-based Center for Environmental Planning and Technology (CEPT) University, Indore is among the Top Scorers. The cities have been ranked based on the extent to which they have communicated and taken public feedback on their plans through basic online platforms : the urban local body websites, Facebook page and the Union government portal mygov.in.

== Revenue sources ==
The following are the Income sources for the Corporation from the Central and State Government.

=== Revenue from taxes ===
Following is the Tax related revenue for the corporation.

- Property tax.
- Profession tax.
- Entertainment tax.
- Grants from Central and State Government like Goods and Services Tax.
- Advertisement tax.

=== Revenue from non-tax sources ===
Following is the Non Tax related revenue for the corporation.

- Water usage charges.
- Fees from Documentation services.
- Rent received from municipal property.
- Funds from municipal bonds.
- Carbon-credit trading.
