= Panchvalley Passenger =

Train in India

Penchvalley Express
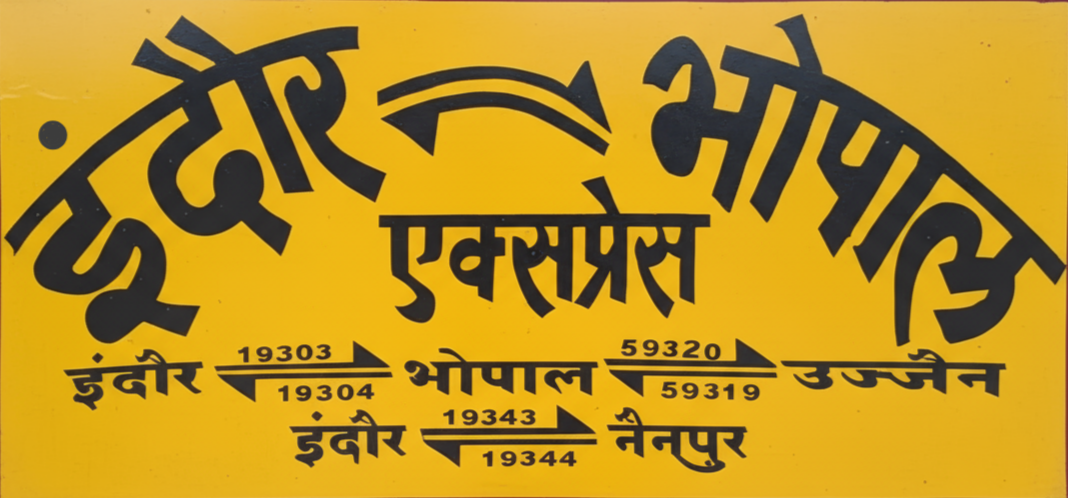
- Train board of Penchvalley Express.

Overview
- Service type: Express
- Locale: Madhya Pradesh
- First service: 2006; 20 years ago
- Current operator: Western Railway

Route
- Termini: Nainpur (NIR); Indore (INDB)
- Stops: 31
- Distance travelled: 694 km (431 mi)
- Average journey time: 17 hrs 25 mins
- Service frequency: Daily
- Train number: 19343 / 19344

On-board services
- Classes: AC 3 Tier, Sleeper Class, General Unreserved
- Seating arrangements: Yes
- Sleeping arrangements: Yes
- Catering facilities: E-catering only
- Observation facilities: Large windows
- Baggage facilities: No
- Other facilities: Below the seats

Technical
- Rolling stock: ICF coach
- Track gauge: Broad Gauge
- Operating speed: 40 km/h (25 mph) average including halts.

The 19343 / 19344 Penchvalley Express is the daily express train which runs between Indore Junction BG railway station of Indore City and Nainpur railway station of Nainpur. Both cities are located in the state of Madhya Pradesh. It ran combined with 18237 / 18238 Chhattisgarh Express between Amla Junction & Bhopal Junction until 2020.

== History ==
The Panchvalley Fast Passenger (train numbers 59385/59386) operated between Indore Junction BG (INDB) and Chhindwara Junction (CWA) in Madhya Pradesh.

For instance, train no. 59386 started from Chhindwara at about 21:05 and reached Indore the next day in the early afternoon. The reverse direction train, 59385, left Indore in the afternoon and reached Chhindwara the following early morning.

The name Panchvalley (often spelled “Panchvalley” or “Penchvalley”) refers to the Pench Valley region in central India, which lies around Chhindwara. As a “Fast Passenger” train it provided vital connectivity for smaller stations along its route – a mix of passenger train service and somewhat faster than regular stopping passenger services. The typical distance covered was about 550–560 km for the Chhindwara–Indore stretch. It took around 16–17 hours for that stretch. It had many — in one case 46 — halts between source and destination.

Some route/station changes happened over time: for example one record shows extension to or through other legs beyond the original, though details are a bit sparse. Eventually the fast passenger got converted into an Express category and started to run as the “Penchvalley Express”. The Panchvalley Fast Passenger was a daily (or regular) train service running between Chhindwara and Indore, named after the Pench Valley region, serving many intermediate stations and offering vital regional rail connectivity in Madhya Pradesh. In 2023 the train was extended to Seoni. In July 2025, the train was extended till Nainpur Junction.

== Coach Composition ==
The train consists of 16 coaches :

- 1 AC III Tier
- 5 Sleeper Class
- 8 General Unreserved
- 2 Seating cum Luggage Rake

== Service ==
The 19343/Penchvalley Express has an average speed of 40 km/h and covers 694 km in 17 hrs 25 mins.

The 19344/Penchvalley Express has an average speed of 40 km/h and covers 694 km in 17 hrs 25 mins.

== Route and halts ==
The important halts of the train are :

- Indore Junction
- Dewas Junction
- Maksi Junction
- Bercha
- Akodia
- Shujalpur
- Kalapipal
- Sehore
- Sant Hirdaram Nagar
- Bhopal Junction
- Rani Kamalapati
- Narmadapuram
- Itarsi Junction
- Ghoradongri
- Betul
- Amla Junction
- Chhindwara Junction
- Seoni
- Nainpur Junction

== Schedule ==
Train Number	Station Code	Departure Station	Departure Time	Departure Day	Arrival Station	Arrival Time	Arrival Day
19343	INDB	Indore Junction	13:05 PM	Daily	Nainpur Junction	06:30 AM	Daily
19344	NIR	Nainpur Junction	19:00 PM	Daily	Indore Junction	12:45 PM	Daily

== Rake Sharing ==
The train shares its rake with:

- 19303/19304 Indore - Bhopal Express
- 59319/59320 Bhopal – Ujjain Passenger

== Loco Link ==
Both trains are hauled by a Vadodara Loco Shed or Ratlam Loco Shed based WAP 5 or WAP 4 electric locomotives.

== Number and nomenclature ==
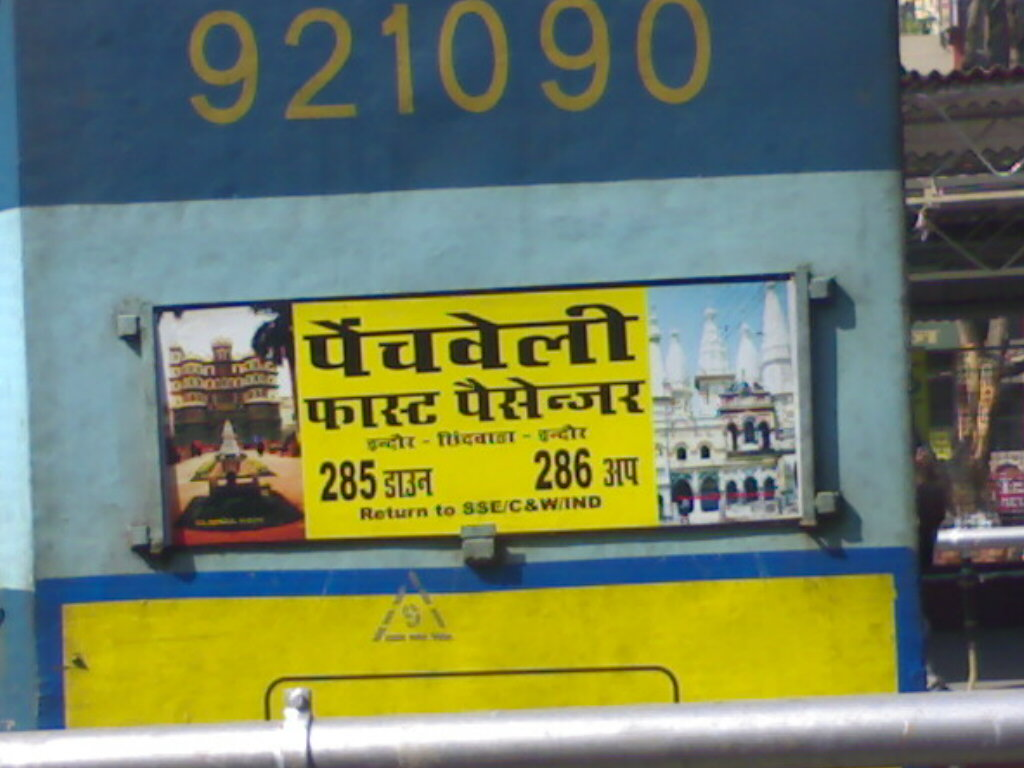

The old/new number provided for the train is :

- 0285/59385- Indore to Seoni
- 0286/59386 - Chhindwara to Indore

The name Panch Valley signifies the Pench Valley, home of the Mogli and Pench national park.

== See also ==
- Indore Junction
- Nainpur Junction railway station
