= Naranjipur railway station =

Railway station in Madhya Pradesh

Naranjipur

General information
- Location: Dewas, Madhya Pradesh; India
- Coordinates: 23.0466°N 76.0088°E
- Elevation: 513 metres (1,683 ft)
- System: Express train and Passenger train station
- Owner: Indian Railways
- Line: Indore-Dewas-Ujjain section
- Platforms: 1
- Tracks: 2 (Single electric line)
- Connections: Auto stand

Construction
- Structure type: Standard (on-ground station)
- Parking: No
- Cycle facilities: No

Other information
- Status: Active
- Station code: NRGR
- Zone(s): Western Railway zone
- Division(s): Ratlam

Services
| Preceding station | Indian Railways | Following station |
|---|---|---|
| Dewas Junction towards ? | Western Railway zone Indore-Dewas-Ujjain section | Undasa Madhopur towards ? |
Location
- Interactive map

Naranjipur railway station is a small railway station in Dewas district, Madhya Pradesh. Its code is NRGR.

== Background ==
It serves Naranjipur village. The station consists of one platform.

== Major trains ==
The trains having stoppage at the station are listed as follows:

| Number | Name | To | Type |
|---|---|---|---|
| 09506/09507 | Indore–Ujjain Passenger | Ujjain Junction | Local |
| 09587/09588 | Indore–Nagda Passenger | Nagda | Local |
