= Indore–Bhopal Express =

Train in India

Indore - Bhopal Express
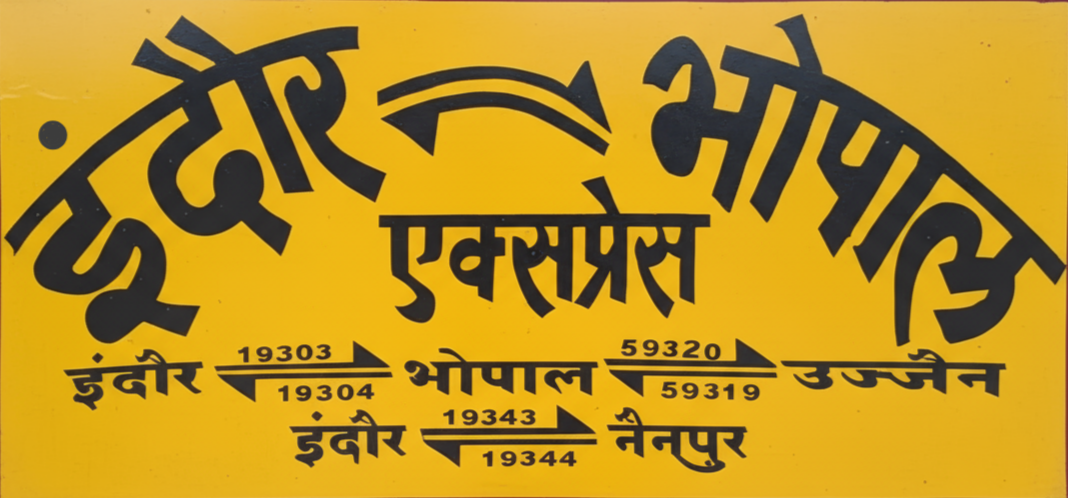

Overview
- Service type: Express
- Locale: Madhya Pradesh
- Current operator: Western Railways

Route
- Termini: Indore Junction; Bhopal Junction
- Stops: 16
- Distance travelled: 263 km (163 mi)
- Average journey time: 5 hrs 45 mins
- Service frequency: Daily
- Train number: 19303/19304

On-board services
- Classes: AC 3 Tier, Sleeper Class, General Unreserved
- Seating arrangements: Yes
- Sleeping arrangements: Yes

Technical
- Operating speed: 46 km/h (29 mph) average with halts

The 19303/19304 Indore - Bhopal Express also known as Raatrani Express is an express train which runs between Indore Junction railway station of Indore, the largest city & commercial hub of Central Indian state Madhya Pradesh and Bhopal Junction railway station of Bhopal, the capital city of Madhya Pradesh.

== Coach composition ==
The train consists of 16 coaches :

- 1 AC III Tier
- 5 Sleeper Class
- 8 General Unreserved
- 2 Seating cum Luggage Rake

== Service ==
The 19303/Indore - Bhopal Express has an average speed of 46 km/h and covers 263 km in 5 hrs 45 mins.

The 19304/Bhopal - Indore Express has an average speed of 47 km/h and covers 263 km in 5 hrs 35 mins.

== Route and halts ==
The important halts of the train are :

- Indore Junction
- Dewas Junction
- Ujjain Junction
- Maksi Junction
- Bercha
- Akodia
- Shujalpur
- Kalapipal
- Jabri
- Sehore
- Sant Hirdaram Nagar
- Bhopal Junction

== Schedule ==
Train Number	Station Code	Departure Station	Departure Time	Departure Day	Arrival Station	Arrival Time	Arrival Day
19303	INDB	Indore Junction	23:15 PM	Daily	Bhopal Junction	05:10 AM	Daily
19304	BPL	Bhopal Junction	23:10 PM	Daily	Indore Junction	04:55 AM	Daily

== Rake sharing ==
The train shares its rake with:

- 19343/19344 Indore - Nainpur Penchvalley Express
- 59319/59320 Bhopal – Ujjain Passenger

== Traction ==
Both trains are hauled by a Vadodara Loco Shed based WAP 5 or WAP 4E electric locomotives.

== See also ==
- Indore Junction
- Bhopal Junction
