= Undasa Madhopur railway station =

Railway station in Madhya Pradesh

Undasa Madhopur

General information
- Location: Dewas, Madhya Pradesh; India
- Coordinates: 23.0880°N 75.9785°E
- Elevation: 531 metres (1,742 ft)
- System: Passenger train station
- Owner: Indian Railways
- Line: Indore-Dewas-Ujjain section
- Platforms: 1
- Tracks: 2 (Single electric line)
- Connections: Auto stand

Construction
- Structure type: Standard (on-ground station)
- Parking: No
- Cycle facilities: No

Other information
- Status: Active
- Station code: UDM
- Zone(s): Western Railway zone
- Division(s): Ratlam

Services
Preceding station	Indian Railways	Following station
Naranjipur towards ?	Western Railway zone Indore-Dewas-Ujjain section	Karchha towards ?
Location
- Interactive map

Undasa Madhopur railway station is a small railway station in Dewas district, Madhya Pradesh. Its code is UDM.

== Background ==
It serves Undasa Madhopur village. The station consists of a single platform.

== Major Trains ==
The trains having stoppage at the station are listed as follows:

Number	Name	To	Type
09506/09507	Indore–Ujjain Passenger	Ujjain Junction	Local
09587/09588	Indore–Nagda Passenger	Nagda	Local
