= Bhopal–Dahod Fast Passenger =

Train in India

Dahod Bhopal
Overview
- Service type: Express
- Locale: Madhya Pradesh, Gujarat
- First service: 1999
- Current operator: Western Railway

Route
- Termini: Rani Kamalapati; Dahod
- Distance travelled: 199 km (124 mi)
- Average journey time: 4h 58m
- Service frequency: Daily
- Train number: 19339UP / 19340DN

On-board services
- Classes: First class, sleeper 3 tier, unreserved
- Seating arrangements: Yes
- Sleeping arrangements: Yes
- Catering facilities: No
- Entertainment facilities: No

Technical
- Operating speed: 40 km/h (25 mph) average with halts

The Dahod Bhopal Fast Passenger is a passenger train of the Indian Railways, which runs between Rani Kamalapati railway station of Bhopal, the capital city of Madhya Pradesh and Dahod railway station of Dahod in Gujarat.

== Arrival and departure ==
- Train no. 59320 departs from Dahod, daily at 05:40 hrs., reaching HabibGanj the same day at 16:20 hrs.
- Train no. 59319 departs from HabibGanj daily at 11:50 hrs. from platform no. 3 reaching Dahod the next day at 23:00 hrs.

== Route and halts ==
The important halts of the train are:

- Dahod railway station
- Meghnagar railway station
- Ratlam Junction railway station
- Nagda Junction railway station
- Ujjain Junction railway station
- Maksi Junction railway station
- Shujalpur railway station
- Sehore railway station
- Sant Hirdaram Nagar railway station
- Bhopal Junction railway station
- Rani Kamalapati railway station

== Coach composite ==
The train consists of 18 coaches:

- 1 first class
- 2 sleeper coaches
- 4 unreserved
- 1 ladies/handicapped
- 2 luggage/brake van

== Average speed and frequency ==
The train runs with an average speed of 40 km/h. The train runs on a daily basis.

== Loco link ==
The train is hauled by Vadodara VRC WAM4/WAP4 electric locomotives.

== Rake maintenance & sharing ==
The train is maintained by the Bhopal Coaching Depot. The same rake is used for five trains, which are Indore–Bhandarkund Panchvalley Passenger, Indore–Maksi Fast Passenger, Indore–Ujjain Passenger, Bhopal–Indore Express and Bhopal–Bina Passenger for one way which is altered by the second rake on the other way.

== See also ==
- Rani Kamalapati - Dr. Ambedkar Nagar Intercity Express
- Bhopal Junction railway station
