= Ujjain–Indore Passenger =

Train in India

Indore–Ujjain Passenger
Overview
- Service type: passenger
- Locale: Madhya Pradesh
- Current operator(s): Western Railway

Route
- Termini: Indore Junction; Ujjain Junction
- Stops: 9
- Distance travelled: 86 km (53 mi)
- Average journey time: 2 hours
- Service frequency: Daily
- Train number(s): 59307UP / 59308DN

On-board services
- Class(es): First Class, Sleeper 3 Tier, Unreserved
- Seating arrangements: Yes
- Sleeping arrangements: Yes

Technical
- Operating speed: 40 km/h (25 mph) average with halts

The Indore–Ujjain Passenger is a passenger train of the Indian Railways, which runs between Indore Junction railway station of Indore, the largest city and commercial capital of Madhya Pradesh and Ujjain Junction railway station of Ujjain, the 5th largest city and cultural capital of Madhya Pradesh

== Schedule ==
The following is the current running schedule of the train. It takes roughly 2-2.5 hours to travel to and fro between Indore & Ujjain depending on the route taken.

=== Ujjain to Indore ===
| Train No. | Departure | Departure Time | Arrival | Arrival Time | Service |
|---|---|---|---|---|---|
| 09351 | Ujjain Junction | 06:20 | Indore Junction | 07:55 | Daily |
| 09353 | Ujjain Junction | 16:00 | Indore Junction | 17:40 | Daily |
| 09506 | Ujjain Junction | 08:10 | Indore Junction | 10:40 | Daily |

=== Indore to Ujjain ===
| Train No. | Departure | Departure Time | Arrival | Arrival Time | Service |
|---|---|---|---|---|---|
| 09352 | Indore Junction | 08:20 | Ujjain Junction | 09:45 | Daily |
| 09354 | Indore Junction | 11:10 | Ujjain Junction | 12:45 | Daily |
| 09507 | Indore Junction | 18:00 | Ujjain Junction | 20:05 | Daily |

== Route and halts ==
=== Via Dewas ===
The train 09506/09507 travels on the Indore-Dewas-Ujjain section via Dewas Jn. The important halts of the train are :

- Ujjain Jn
- Karchha
- Dewas Jn
- Manglia
- Laxmibai Nagar
- Indore Jn

=== Via Fatehabad Chandrawatiganj ===
The trains 09351/09352 and 09353/09354 travel on the Fatehabad Chandrawatiganj-Ujjain section via Fatehabad Chandrawatiganj Jn.The important halts of the train are :

- Ujjain Jn
- Chintaman Ganesh
- Fatehabad Chandrawatiganj Jn
- Ajnod
- Laxmibai Nagar
- Indore Jn

== Coach composite ==
The train consists of 18 coaches:

- 1 First Class
- 4 Sleeper coaches
- 10 Unreserved
- 1 Ladies/Handicapped
- 2 Luggage/Brake van

== Average speed and frequency ==
The train runs with an average speed of 35 km/h. The train runs on a daily basis.

== Loco link ==
The train is hauled by Ratlam RTM WDM-3 Diesel engine.

== Rake maintenance and sharing ==
The train is maintained by the Indore Coaching Depot. The same rake is used for five trains, which are Indore–Chhindwara Panchvalley Express, Indore–Maksi Fast Passenger, Bhopal–Ujjain Passenger, Bhopal–Indore Passenger and Bhopal–Bina Passenger for one way which is altered by the second rake on the other way.

== See also ==
- Avantika Express
- Indore Junction
- Bhopal Junction
