= Indore–Nagpur Tri Shatabdi Express =

Train in India

Overview
- Service type: Superfast Express
- Locale: Madhya Pradesh & Maharashtra
- Current operator: Western Railways

Route
- Termini: Indore Junction (INDB); Nagpur (NGP)
- Stops: 13
- Distance travelled: 653.2 km (406 mi)
- Average journey time: 11 hrs 50 mins
- Service frequency: Weekly
- Train number: 12913 / 12914

On-board services
- Classes: AC 2 Tier, AC 3 Tier, Sleeper class, General Unreserved
- Seating arrangements: Yes
- Sleeping arrangements: Yes
- Catering facilities: E-catering
- Observation facilities: Large windows
- Other facilities: Below the Seats

Technical
- Rolling stock: LHB coach
- Track gauge: 1,676 mm (5 ft 6 in)
- Operating speed: 55 km/h (34 mph) average with halts

The 12913 / 12914 Indore–Nagpur Tri Shatabdi Express is a weekly Superfast Express train of the Indian Railways, which runs between Indore Junction and Nagpur Junction.

== Coach composition ==
The train consists of 22 coaches:

- 1 AC II Tier
- 4 AC III Tier
- 11 Sleeper class
- 4 General Unreserved
- 2 End-on-Generator

== Service ==
- 12913/Indore–Nagpur Tri Shatabdi Express has an average speed of 55 km/h and covers 653.2 km in 11 hrs 50 mins.
- 12914/Nagpur–Indore Tri Shatabdi Express has an average speed of 55 km/h and covers 653.2 km in 11 hrs 50 mins.

== Route & halts ==
The important halts of the train are:

- Indore Junction
- Dewas Junction
- Ujjain Junction
- Maksi Junction
- Shujalpur
- Rani Kamalapati
- Betul
- Amla Junction
- Multai
- Pandhurna
- Nagpur Junction

== Schedule ==
Train number	Station code	Departure station	Departure time	Departure day	Arrival station	Arrival time	Arrival day
12913	INDB	Indore Junction	20:35 PM	Sun	Nagpur Junction	08:25 AM	Mon
12914	NGP	Nagpur Junction	19:00 PM	Mon	Indore Junction	06:50 AM	Tue

== Rake sharing ==
The train shares its rake with 19311/19312 Indore–Pune Express (via Panvel).

== Direction reversal ==
Train reverses its direction at:

- Ujjain Junction

== Traction ==
Both trains are hauled by a Vadodara-based WAP-7 (HOG)-equipped electric locomotive from end to end.

== See also ==
- Ahilyanagari Express
