= Ruthiyai-Maksi section =

Railway line in India

Overview
- Status: Operational
- Owner: Indian Railway
- Locale: Madhya Pradesh
- Termini: Ruthiyai Junction; Maksi Junction

Service
- System: West Central Railway
- Operator: Bhopal railway division

Technical
- Track length: 190 km (118 mi)
- Number of tracks: 1m
- Track gauge: 5 ft 6 in (1,676 mm) broad gauge
- Electrification: Yes
- Operating speed: 100 km/h (62 mph)

The Ruthiyai-Maksi section of the West Central Railway Zone is a fully operational public transit system in the state of Madhya Pradesh. It connects Ruthiyai Jn with Maksi Jn. The section forms a part of the Indore-Gwalior line which connects two important cities, Indore & Gwalior with each other.

The rail section also connects Shajapur, Biaora Rajgarh and Chachaura Binaganj stations along the way. The section connects Gwalior city directly with Guna, Ujjain, Ratlam, Kota, Indore, Bhopal, Dewas & Nagda.

== Developments ==
For a long time, a demand of doubling of the rail section is being raised by the people of the region via their elected representatives in the parliament. However, the demands are yet to be met with a positive response from the Indian Railways.

== See also ==
- West Central Railway
- Indore Junction railway station
- Dewas Junction railway station
- Ujjain Junction railway station
- Guna Junction railway station
