= Karchha railway station =

Railway station in Madhya Pradesh

General information
- Location: State Highway 18, Madhya Pradesh; India
- Coordinates: 23.1048°N 75.9102°E
- Elevation: 514 metres (1,686 ft)
- System: Passenger train station
- Owner: Indian Railways
- Operator: Western Railway
- Line: Indore-Dewas-Ujjain section
- Platforms: 1
- Tracks: 2 (single electrified broad gauge)
- Connections: Auto stand

Construction
- Structure type: Standard (on ground station)
- Parking: Yes
- Cycle facilities: Yes

Other information
- Status: Functioning
- Station code: KDHA
- Zone(s): Western Railway
- Division(s): Ratlam

Services
Preceding station	Indian Railways	Following station
Undasa Madhopur towards ?	Western Railway zone Indore-Dewas-Ujjain section	Matana Buzurg towards ?
Location
- Interactive map

Karchha railway station is a small railway station in Ujjain district, Madhya Pradesh. Its code is KDHA. It serves Narwar town. The station consists of one platform, not well sheltered. It lacks many facilities including water and sanitation.

== Major Trains ==
The trains having stoppage at the station are listed as follows:

Number	Name	To	Type
09506/09507	Indore–Ujjain Passenger	Ujjain Junction	Local
09587/09588	Indore–Nagda Passenger	Nagda	Local
