= Bhopal–Ujjain Passenger =

Train in India

Bhopal - Ujjain Passenger
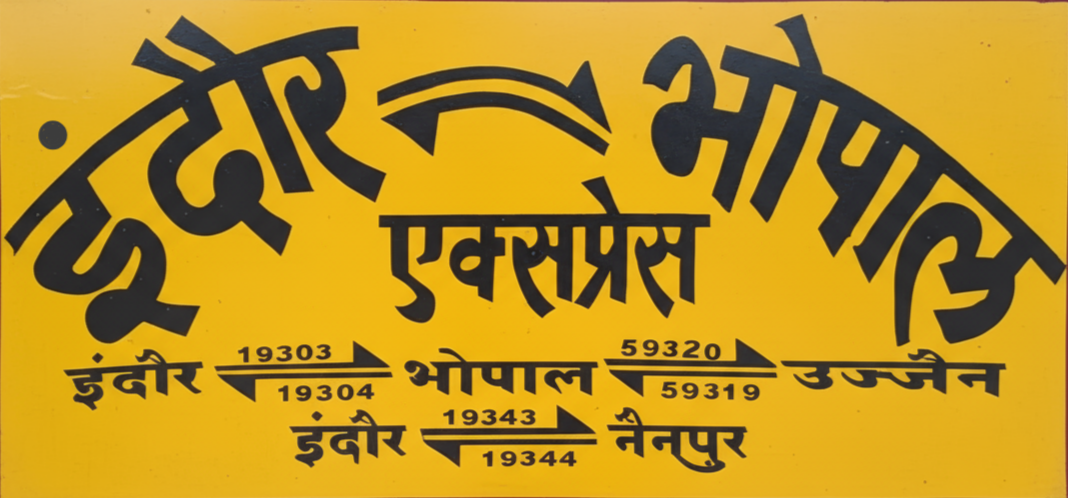
- Train board of Bhopal - Ujjain Passenger.

Overview
- Service type: passenger
- Locale: Madhya Pradesh
- Current operator: Western Railway

Route
- Termini: Bhopal Junction; Ujjain Junction
- Distance travelled: 282 km (175 mi)
- Average journey time: 4.5 hours
- Service frequency: Daily
- Train number: 59320UP / 59319DN

On-board services
- Classes: AC 3 Tier, Sleeper 3 Tier, Unreserved
- Seating arrangements: Yes
- Sleeping arrangements: Yes

Technical
- Operating speed: 39 km/h (24 mph) average with halts

The Bhopal–Ujjain Passenger is a passenger train of the Indian Railways, which runs between Bhopal Junction railway station of Bhopal, the capital city of Madhya Pradesh and Ujjain Junction railway station of Ujjain, the holy city of Central Indian state Madhya Pradesh.

== History ==
In March 2017, ISIS planned low intensity explosion in Bhopal-Ujjain passenger when train was Jabri railway station, 80 km before Bhopal injuring 10 passenger in the train.

== Arrival and departure ==
- Train no.59320 departs from Bhopal, daily at 06:20 hrs. from platform no. 6, reaching Ujjain the same day at 11:00 hrs.
- Train no.59319 departs from Ujjain daily at 17:00 hrs. from platform no.3 reaching Bhopal at 22:15 hrs.

== Route and halts ==
The important halts of the train are: Bhopal Junction, Bhopal Bairagarh, Shujalpur, Maksi, Tarana, Ujjain Pingleshwar, and Ujjain Junction.

== Coach composition ==
The train consists of 16 coaches:

- 1 AC Three Tier/3rd AC
- 5 Sleeper coaches
- 8 Unreserved
- 2 SLR

== Average speed and frequency ==
The train runs with an average speed of 39 km/h. The train runs on a daily basis.

== Loco link ==
The train is hauled by WAP5 or WAP4 Electric engine.

== Rake maintenance and sharing ==
The train is maintained at Indore Junction. The same rake is used for two trains, which are 19343/19344 Indore–Nainpur Panchvalley Express and 19303/19304 Indore-Bhopal Express. There are 4 rakes of this train each of which operate in the following sequence: 19303-59320-59319-19304-19343-19344

== See also ==
- Avantika Express
- Indore Junction
- Bhopal Junction
- 2017 Bhopal–Ujjain Passenger train bombing
