= Jabri railway station =

Railway station in Madhya Pradesh

General information
- Location: National Highway 12, Jabri, Shajapur district, Madhya Pradesh; India
- Coordinates: 23.2936°N 76.8905°E
- Elevation: 480 metres (1,570 ft)
- System: Indian Railways station
- Owner: Indian Railways
- Operator: Western Railway zone
- Platforms: 2
- Tracks: 4
- Connections: Auto stand

Construction
- Structure type: Standard (on-ground station)
- Parking: No
- Cycle facilities: No

Other information
- Status: Double electric line
- Station code: JBX
- Zone(s): Western Railway zone
- Division(s): Ratlam
Location

Jabri railway station is a small railway station in Shajapur district, Madhya Pradesh. Its code is JBX. It serves Jabadiya Bheel village. The station consists of two platforms, neither well sheltered. It lacks many facilities including water and sanitation.

== Bombing of Jabri railway station ==
On 7 March 2017, terrorists who were known to authorities to be radicalized by ISIS planted low intensity explosives in the Bhopal–Ujjain Passenger train at the Jabri railway station, injuring ten passengers. It was the first-ever strike in India by the so-called Islamic State.

== Major trains ==
- Bhopal–Indore Fast Passenger
- Bhopal–Ujjain Passenger
- Habibganj–Dahod Fast Passenger
- Ujjain–Bhopal passenger

== See also ==
- 2017 Bhopal–Ujjain Passenger train bombing
