= Vikramnagar railway station =

Railway station in Madhya Pradesh

VIKRAM NAGAR
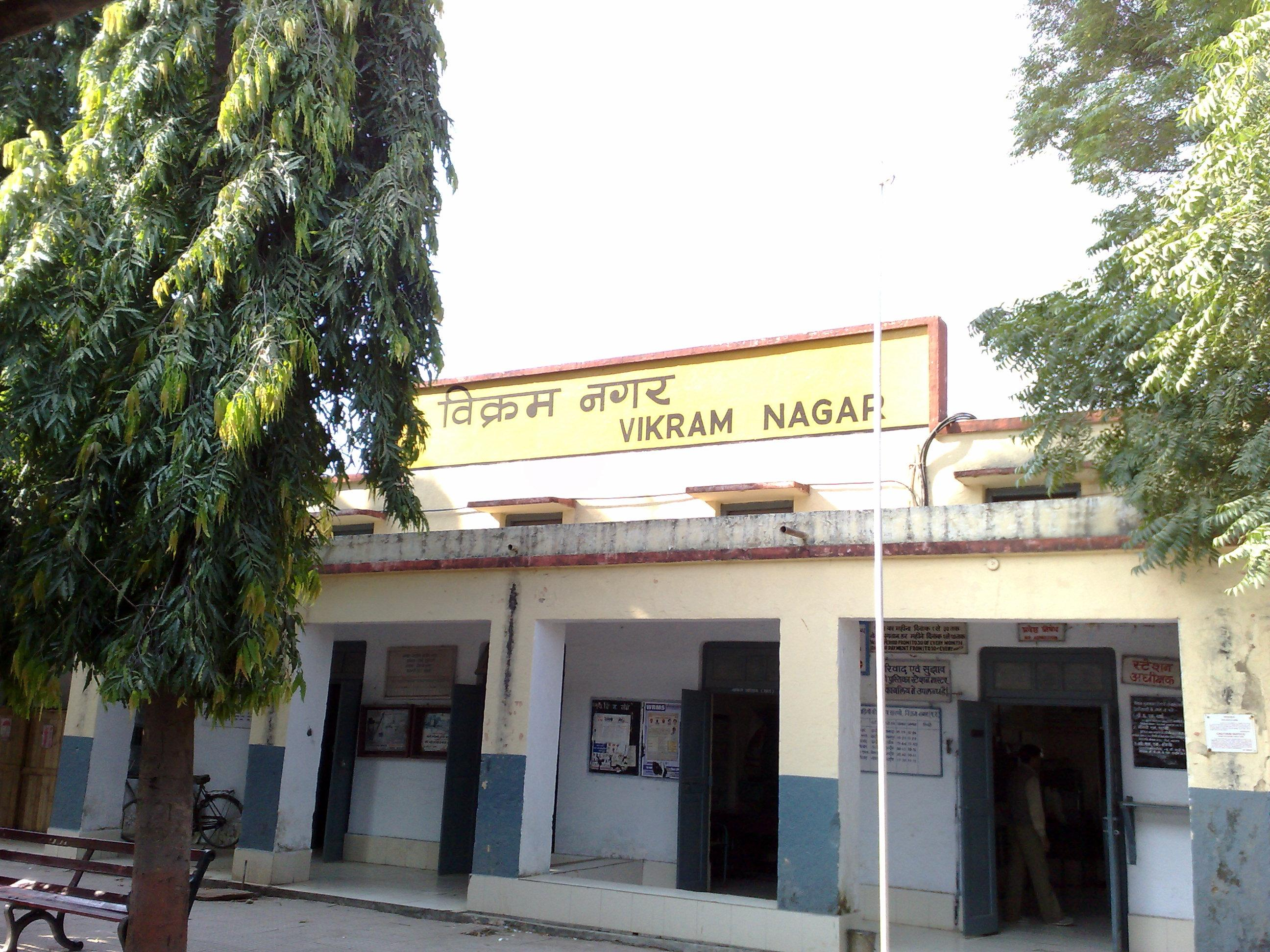
- Vikramnagar Main exit

General information
- Location: Ujjain, Madhya Pradesh; India
- Coordinates: 23.162°N 75.818°E
- Elevation: 503 m (1,650 ft)
- System: Express and Passenger train station
- Owner: Indian Railways
- Line: Indore-Dewas-Ujjain section
- Platforms: 2 BG
- Tracks: 4 BG
- Connections: Taxi stand, Auto stand

Construction
- Structure type: Standard (on-ground station)
- Parking: Available
- Cycle facilities: Available
- Accessible: Disabled access

Other information
- Station code: VRG
- Fare zone: Western Railway

History
- Electrified: 2012

Services
Preceding station	Indian Railways	Following station
Matana Buzurg towards ?	Western Railway zone Indore-Dewas-Ujjain section	Ujjain Junction towards ?
Location
- Interactive map

Vikramnagar is a small railway station in Ujjain, Madhya Pradesh. Its code is VRG.

== Etymology ==
The Name of the Station is named after The King Vikramaditya of the Ujjaini Kingdom.

== Structure and location ==
The station lies on the Indore-Dewas-Ujjain section rail route in Ujjain city. The station consist of two platforms, neither well sheltered. It lacks many facilities including Water and Sanitation. The main railway station of City, Ujjain Junction is always preferred over Vikramnagar station for catching several trains. This station is only suitable for local travelling within Ujjain City.

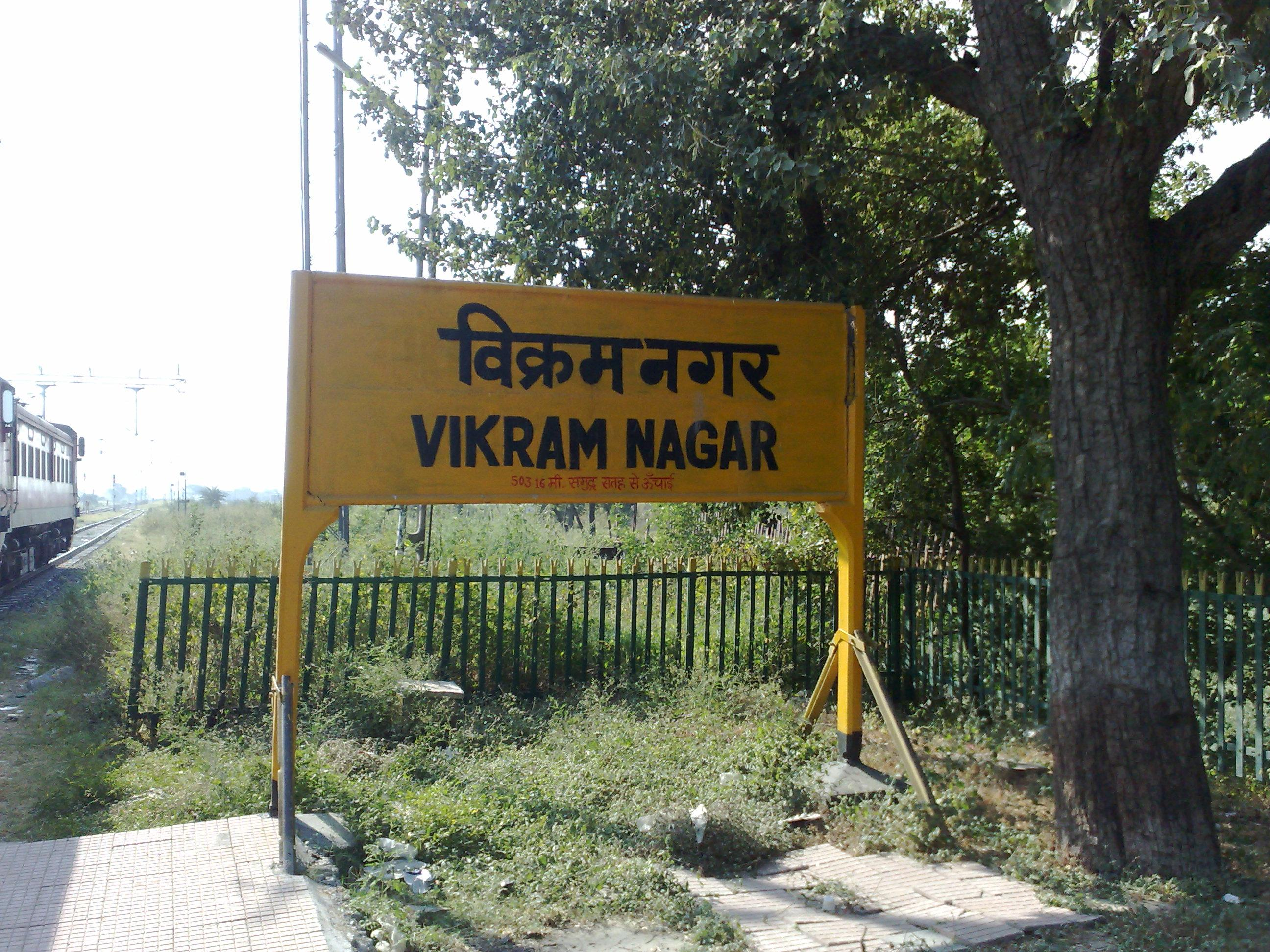
Vikramnagar stationboard

== Major trains ==
The trains having stoppage at the station are listed as follows:

Number	Name	To	Type
18233/18234	Narmada Express	Bilaspur	Express
09506/09507	Indore–Ujjain Passenger	Ujjain Junction	Local
09587/09588	Indore–Nagda Passenger	Nagda	Local

== See also ==
- Ujjain Junction
- Ujjain
- Avantika
- Indore
