= Vikram Nagar, Ujjian =

Upcoming residential locality

Coordinates: 23.164°N 75.817°E

Vikram Nagar is an upcoming residential locality within Ujjain, Madhya Pradesh. As the number of land developers have increased here, real estate prices have shot up and are comparable to the posh areas of Ujjain. Vikram Nagar is located near the Vikramnagar railway station a suburban station of Ujjain. It is located near Vikram University as well.

== Etymology ==
The name of the area is derived from King Vikramaditya of the Ujjaini Kingdom.

== See also ==
- Ujjain
