= Binjana railway station =

Railway station in Madhya Pradesh, India

Binjana

General information
- Location: Binjana, Dewas district, Madhya Pradesh; India
- Coordinates: 22°55′52″N 75°59′12″E
- Elevation: 519 m (1,703 ft)
- System: Passenger train station
- Owner: Indian Railways
- Operator: Western Railway
- Line: Indore-Dewas-Ujjain section
- Platforms: 2
- Tracks: 2

Construction
- Structure type: Standard (on ground station)

Other information
- Status: Active
- Station code: BNJN
- Zone(s): Western Railway zone
- Division(s): Ratlam

History
- Opened: 1899

Services
Preceding station	Indian Railways	Following station
Dewas Junction towards ?	Western Railway zone Indore-Dewas-Ujjain section	Barlai towards ?
Location
- Interactive map

Binjana railway station is a railway station on Indore–Gwalior line under the Ratlam railway division of Western Railway zone. This is situated at Binjana in Dewas district of the Indian state of Madhya Pradesh.
