= Pingleshwar railway station =

Railway station in Madhya Pradesh

Pingleshwar

General information
- Location: Ujjain, MP; India
- Coordinates: 23.2112°N 75.8608°E
- Elevation: 557 m (1,827 ft)
- System: Indian Railway station
- Owner: Indian Railways
- Operator: Ratlam railway division
- Line: Ujjain-Bhopal section
- Platforms: 2
- Tracks: 2

Construction
- Structure type: Standard (on ground station)
- Parking: Available
- Cycle facilities: Available
- Accessible: Disabled access

Other information
- Status: BG
- Station code: PLW
- Fare zone: Western Railways

Services
Preceding station	Indian Railways	Following station
Ujjain Junction towards ?	Western Railway zone Ujjain-Bhopal section	Tajpur towards ?
Location
- Location within India Location within Madhya Pradesh

Pingleshwar railway station is a railway station of Ujjain, Madhya Pradesh. It is operated by Western Railway Zone which lies on Ujjain-Bhopal track. The station consist of two platforms. The platforms are not well sheltered. It lacks many facilities including water and sanitation.

== Connectivity ==
- Bhopal Ratlam Passenger
- Dahod Habibganj Fast Passenger
- Bina Ratlam via Nagda Passenger
- Nagda Bina Passenger
