= Indore–Budhni line =

Under-construction railway line in Madhya Pradesh, India

Overview
- Status: Under construction
- Owner: Indian Railways
- Locale: Madhya Pradesh, India
- Termini: Manglia Gaon; Budhni
- Stations: 18

Service
- Type: Broad gauge
- System: Indian Railways
- Operator(s): Western Railway; West Central Railway

Technical
- Line length: 198 km (123 mi)
- Number of tracks: 1
- Character: At grade, with tunnels and viaducts
- Track gauge: 5 ft 6 in (1,676 mm) broad gauge
- Electrification: Electrified
- Operating speed: 160 km/h (99 mph) (design speed)

The Indore–Budhni railway line is an under-construction broad gauge railway line in the Indian state of Madhya Pradesh. It connects Manglaya Sadak near Indore with Budhni, providing a direct rail link between the Indore region and the existing national railway network at Budhni.

The project is being implemented by Rail Vikas Nigam Limited (RVNL). Current Government of India project-monitoring records identify it as the Indore–Budni New Railway Line [198 kms], with an updated project cost of ₹7,474 crore and a target completion date of 30 September 2030.

== History ==
The Cabinet Committee on Economic Affairs (CCEA) approved the construction of a new broad-gauge line between Budni and Indore (Mangliya Gaon) in September 2018. The project was originally sanctioned as a 205.5 km (128 mi) line at an estimated cost of ₹3,261.82 crore, including electrification.

The project aims to improve railway connectivity in western Madhya Pradesh and provide an alternative route between Indore and destinations towards eastern and southern India. The original proposal noted that the line would reduce rail distance between Indore and Jabalpur by approximately 68 kilometres (42 mi) compared to the route via Bhopal.

The alignment serves previously unserved interior hubs, including Nasrullaganj, Khategaon, and Kannod. Project-monitoring records later updated the sanctioned route length to 198 km (123 mi).

== Route and stations ==
The line originates at Mangliya Gaon near Indore and moves eastward through Indore district, Dewas district, and Sehore district before connecting to the main network at Budhni.

RVNL's project documentation identifies 18 planned stations along the corridor, comprising 15 crossing stations and 3 halt stations.

#	Station name	Station code	Connections
1	Manglia Gaon	MGG	Indore Junction / Main Network
2	Panod	—	None
3	Samaliya Chau	—	None
4	Raghogarh	—	None
5	Chapda	—	None
6	Kheri	—	None
7	Hathnora	—	None
8	Deoli	—	None
9	Kannod	—	None
10	Rehti	—	None
11	Khategaon	—	None
12	Pipaliya Nankar	—	None
13	Bapcha	—	None
14	Nasrullaganj	—	None
15	Ramgarh Barghau	—	None
16	Salkanpur	—	None
17	Balkhera	—	None
18	Budhni	BNI	Bhopal–Nagpur section

== Infrastructure and engineering ==
The corridor is engineered as an electrified broad-gauge route with a design speed of 160 km/h (99 mph). The infrastructure features major viaducts, road underbridges (RUBs), road overbridges (ROBs), and tunnels, operating completely level-crossing-free.

=== Tunnels ===
The project features two major tunnels with a combined length of 9.88 km (6.14 mi).

Tunnel	Chainage	Length
Tunnel 1	33+160 – 34+400	1.24 km (0.77 mi)
Tunnel 2	57+400 – 66+040	8.64 km (5.37 mi)

== Status and construction ==
Civil engineering, track-laying, electrification, and signaling works are being carried out in packages by RVNL. The main tunnel construction contract was awarded at a cost of approximately ₹872.69 crore.

As of August 2026, construction is ongoing across the corridor. Project monitoring records under code 705763 indicate physical progress of 35% with a cumulative expenditure of ₹2,529.03 crore through early 2026.

== See also ==
- Rail transport in Madhya Pradesh
- Indore–Dahod line
- Chhota Udaipur–Dhar line
- Manmad–Indore line
