= Freeganj =

Coordinates: 23.178°N 75.791°E

- Interactive map of Freeganj
- Country: India
- State: Madhya Pradesh
- District: Ujjain district

Freeganj is the most affluent and expensive area of Ujjain, the fourth largest city in the Indian state of Madhya Pradesh. Freeganj is known for its education hub. There is a park known as "Shaheed Park" in its center. It has many coaching institutes for IIT-JEE, Medical and School Coaching. Ghantaghar is a Clock tower located in this area. Many hotels are located in this area as this area is nearby to Ujjain Junction railway station.

== See also ==
- Ujjain
