= 2017 Bhopal–Ujjain Passenger train bombing =

Bombing of passenger train in India

The 2017 Bhopal–Ujjain Passenger train bombing was a terrorist attack that occurred on 7 March, on the Bhopal–Ujjain Passenger, a passenger train which runs between Bhopal Junction railway station of Bhopal, the capital city of Madhya Pradesh and Ujjain Junction railway station. The bombing occurred at Jabri railway station in the Shajapur district of Madhya Pradesh, injuring 10 passengers. It was stated to be the first-ever strike in India by the Islamic State. One of the suspected terrorists was later killed in an encounter in Lucknow. The police stated that the module was self-radicalised and did not receive any financial support from the group. Six persons were later arrested. National Investigation Agency (NIA) probe reports stated that the ISIS-inspired module had also conspired to bomb a rally of Prime Minister Narendra Modi.

On 19 March, Indian authorities told the media that the terrorists related to this attack tried to flee India and go to Syria or Iraq.

== See also ==
- Jabri railway station
- List of rail accidents (2010–2019)
- List of Indian rail incidents
- List of terrorist incidents in India
- List of terrorist incidents in March 2017
