= Nagda–Ujjain section =

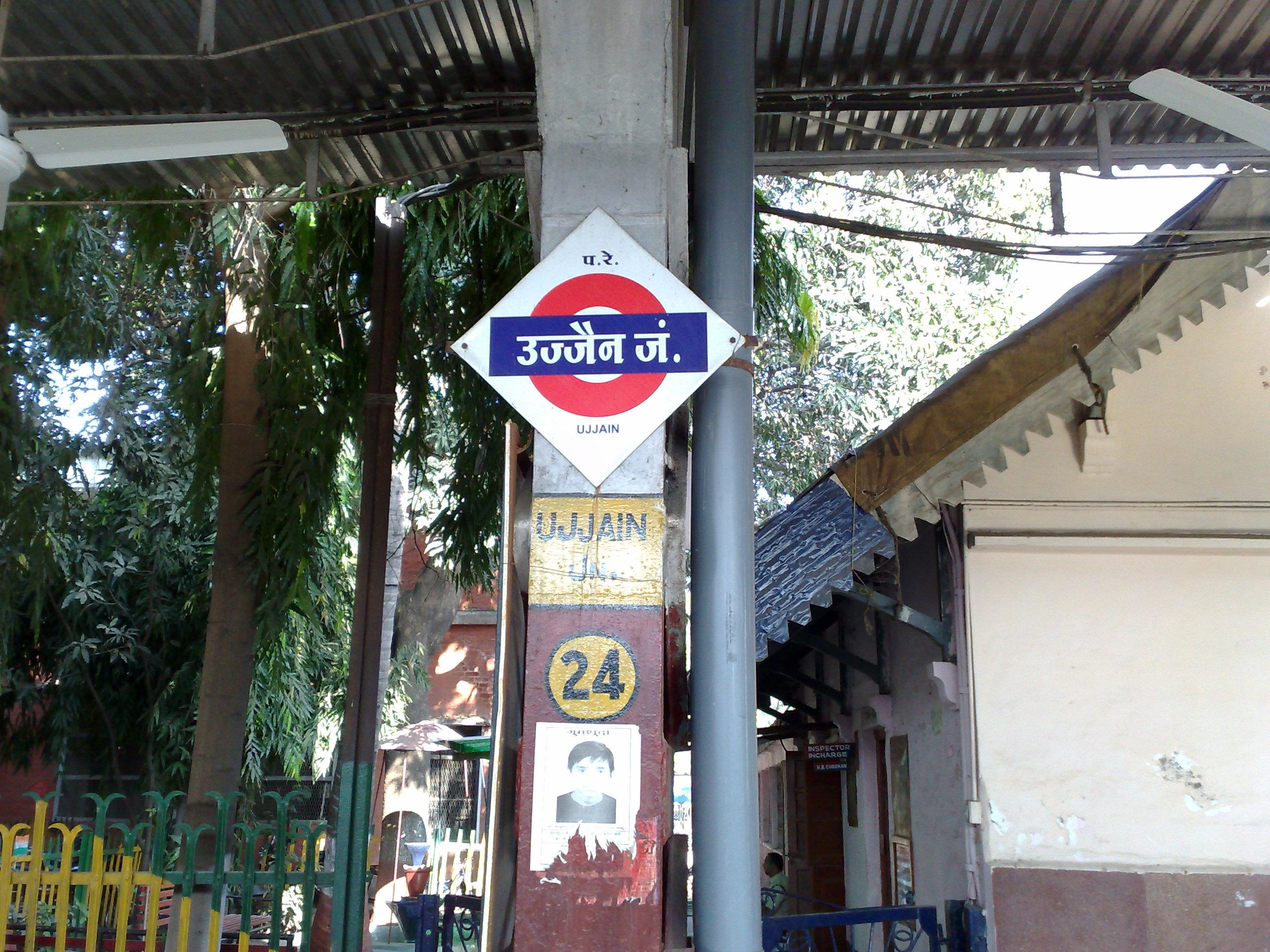
- Ujjain Junction

Overview
- Status: Operational
- Owner: Indian Railways
- Locale: Madhya Pradesh
- Termini: Nagda; Ujjain
- Stations: 6

Service
- Operator: Western Railway

Technical
- Track length: 56 km (35 mi)
- Number of tracks: 2
- Track gauge: 5 ft 6 in (1,676 mm) broad gauge
- Electrification: Yes
- Operating speed: 110 km/h (68 mph)

The Nagda–Ujjain section belongs to Ratlam division of Western Railway zone in Madhya Pradesh State.

== History ==
The Indore-Ujjain branch line was opened in 1876 by Scindia - Neemuch Railway and the line was completed in 1879-80. Scindia - Neemuch Railway amalgamated under a single management in 1881-82 and was named as Rajputana Malwa Railway. Rajputana Malwa Railway was taken over by Bombay, Baroda and Central India Railway in 1885. Meter gauge network of Ratlam division was managed by Bombay, Baroda and Central India Railway.

In 1896, The Nagda–Ujjain section was opened by Bombay, Baroda and Central India Railway. The length of Nagda–Ujjain section was 56 km. Doubling of Nagda–Ujjain section was completed during 1979-81. The branch of Nagda-Piploda Bagla and Piploda Bagla-Palsora Makrawan was electrified during 1989-90. The branch of Palsora Makrawan-Naikheri, Naikheri-Sipra Bridge and Sipra Bridge-Ujjain was electrified during 1990-91 respectively.
