= Indore–Chandigarh Express =

Train in India

Overview
- Service type: Express
- First service: 4 February 2014; 11 years ago
- Current operator: Western Railways

Route
- Termini: Indore Junction (INDB); Chandigarh Junction (CDG)
- Stops: 18
- Distance travelled: 1,119 km (695 mi)
- Average journey time: 25 hours 15 minutes
- Service frequency: Weekly
- Train number: 19307/19308

On-board services
- Classes: AC 2 tier, AC 3 tier, Sleeper class, General Unreserved
- Seating arrangements: Yes
- Sleeping arrangements: Yes
- Catering facilities: E-catering

Technical
- Rolling stock: Standard Indian Railways coaches
- Track gauge: 1,676 mm (5 ft 6 in)
- Operating speed: 110 km/h (68 mph) maximum 47.96 km/h (30 mph) including halts

The 19307/19308 Indore–Chandigarh Express is an Express train belonging to Indian Railways – Western Railway zone that runs between Indore Junction and Chandigarh Junction in India.

It operates as train number 19307 from Indore Junction to Chandigarh Junction and as train number 19308 in the reverse direction, serving the states of Madhya Pradesh, Uttar Pradesh, Haryana, Delhi and the Union territory of Chandigarh.

== Coaches ==
The 19307 / 08 Indore–Chandigarh Express has 1 AC 2 tier, 4 AC 3 tier, 11 Sleeper class, 4 General Unreserved and 2 SLR (Seating cum Luggage Rake) coaches. It does not carry a pantry car.

As is customary with most train services in India, coach composition may be amended at the discretion of Indian Railways depending on demand.

== Service ==
19307 Indore–Chandigarh Express covers the distance of 1119 kilometres in 25 hours 15 mins (45.34 km/h) and in 22 hours 20 mins as 19308 Chandigarh–Indore Express (50.90 km/h).

As the average speed of the train is below 55 km/h (34 mph), as per Indian Railways rules, its fare does not include a Superfast surcharge.

== Routing ==
The 19307 / 08 Indore–Chandigarh Express runs from Indore Junction via Ujjain Junction, Gwalior Junction, Agra Cantt, Mathura Junction, New Delhi, Ambala Cant Junction to Chandigarh Junction.

== Schedule ==
Train number	Station code	Departure station	Departure time	Departure day	Arrival station	Arrival time	Arrival day
19307	INDB	Indore Junction	05:30 AM	Thu	Chandigarh Junction	06:45 AM	Fri
19308	CDG	Chandigarh Junction	19:15 PM	Fri	Indore Junction	17:35 PM	Sat

== Direction reversal ==
Train reverses its direction at:

- Ujjain Junction

== Traction ==
Despite nearly 58% of the route being electrified, a Ratlam-based WDM-3A hauls the train for its entire journey.
