= Matana Buzurg railway station =

Railway station in Madhya Pradesh

Matana Buzurg

General information
- Location: MP SH 18, Chandesara, Madhya Pradesh; India
- Elevation: 501 metres (1,644 ft)
- System: Passenger train station
- Owner: Indian Railways
- Operator: Western Railway
- Line: Indore-Dewas-Ujjain section
- Platforms: 1
- Tracks: 3

Construction
- Structure type: Standard (on-ground station)
- Parking: No
- Cycle facilities: No

Other information
- Status: Single electric line
- Station code: MABG
- Zone(s): Western Railway
- Division(s): Ratlam

Services
Preceding station	Indian Railways	Following station
Karchha towards ?	Western Railway zone Indore-Dewas-Ujjain section	Vikramnagar towards ?
Location
- Interactive map

Matana Buzurg railway station (station code: MABG) is an abandoned railway station of Ujjain, Madhya Pradesh. It is operated by Western Railway which lies on Ujjain–Dewas–Indore track. The station consist of two platforms. The platforms are not well sheltered. It lacks many facilities including water and sanitation.

== Major trains ==
Currently, there are no trains that stop at the station.
