= Indore–Nagda Passenger =

Train in India

Indore - Nagda Passenger
Overview
- Service type: passenger
- Locale: Madhya Pradesh
- First service: 1999
- Current operator(s): Western Railway

Route
- Termini: Indore Junction; Nagda Junction
- Stops: 15
- Distance travelled: 142 km (88 mi)
- Average journey time: 4 hours
- Service frequency: Daily
- Train number(s): 59388UP / 59387DN

On-board services
- Class(es): AC II Tier, AC III Tier, First Class, Sleeper 3 Tier, Unreserved Chair Cars
- Seating arrangements: Yes
- Sleeping arrangements: Yes

Technical
- Operating speed: 35 km/h (22 mph) average with halts

The Indore – Nagda Passenger is a passenger train of Indian Railways, which runs between Indore Junction railway station of Indore, the largest city and commercial hub of Madhya Pradesh and Nagda Junction railway station of Nagda, the important industrial city of Central Indian state Madhya Pradesh

== Arrival and departure ==
Train no.59388 departs from Indore, daily at 08:45 hrs., reaching Nagda the same day at 13.05 hrs. Train no.59387 departs from Nagda daily at 15:25 hrs. from platform no.2 reaching Indore the same day at 19:30 hrs.

== Route and halts ==
The train goes via Dewas and Ujjain. The important halts of the train are:

- INDORE JUNCTION
- Indore Lakshmibai Nagar
- Indore Sanwer
- Dewas Junction
- Barlai
- Danpura
- Ujjain Vikram Nagar
- Ujjain Junction
- Pahu
- NAGDA JUNCTION

== Coach composite ==
The train consists of 9 Coaches :

- 7 Un Reserved
- 2 Luggage/Brake Van

== Average speed and frequency ==
The train runs with an average speed of 35 km/h. The train runs on a daily basis.

== Loco link ==
The train is hauled by BRC WAP4/WAM4 engine.

== Rake maintenance & sharing ==
The train is maintained by the Indore Coaching Depot. The same rake is used for Nagda - Ujjain Passenger for one way which is altered by the second rake on the other way.

== See also ==
- Avantika Express
- Indore Junction
- Bhopal Junction
