= Ahilyanagari Express =

Train in India

Ahilyanagari Superfast Express
Overview
- Service type: Superfast
- Locale: Madhya Pradesh, Maharashtra, Telangana, Andhra Pradesh, Tamil Nadu & Kerala
- First service: 29 October 1988; 37 years ago
- Current operator: Southern Railway

Route
- Termini: Indore Junction (INDB); Thiruvananthapuram North (TVCN)
- Stops: 48
- Distance travelled: 2,645 km (1,644 mi)
- Average journey time: 47 hours 05 mnutes
- Service frequency: Weekly (Note: Runs one day in a week for every direction.)
- Train number: 22645 / 22646

On-board services
- Classes: AC 2 Tier, AC 3 Tier, Ac 3 Tier Economy, Sleeper Class, General Unreserved
- Seating arrangements: Yes
- Sleeping arrangements: Yes
- Catering facilities: E-catering
- Observation facilities: Large windows
- Entertainment facilities: No
- Baggage facilities: No
- Other facilities: Below the seats

Technical
- Rolling stock: LHB coach
- Track gauge: 1,676 mm (5 ft 6 in)
- Operating speed: 57 km/h (35 mph) average including halts.
Route map
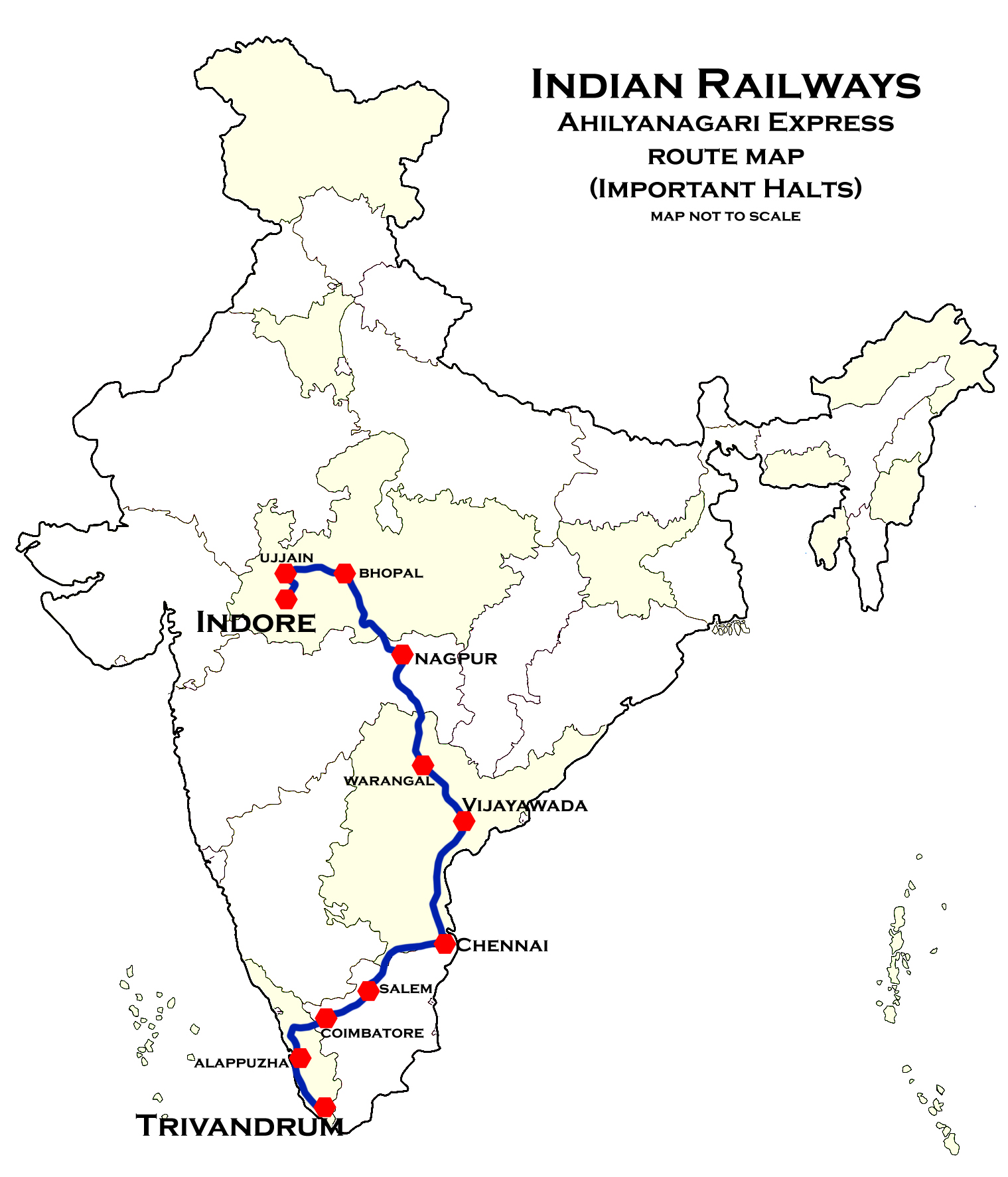

The 22645 / 22646 Ahilyanagari Superfast Express is a superfast express train of the Indian Railways, running between Indore Junction in Madhya Pradesh and Thiruvananthapuram North in Kerala. From February 2021, the terminal was changed to Thiruvananthapuram North instead of Thiruvananthapuram Central in Kerala.

The name Ahilyanagari signifies the former name of the city of the Devi Ahilyabai Holkar, that is, Indore. Previously, it was running between Cochin Harbour Terminus and Indore, and later it was extended to Thiruvananthapuram. In February 2021, its terminal was changed to Kochuveli near Thiruvananthapuram Central

== Service ==
The 22645 Ahilyanagari Express has an average speed of 56 km/h and covers 2645 km in 47 hours and 5 minutes.

The 22646 Ahilyanagari Express has an average speed of 57 km/h and covers 2645 km in 46 hours 30 minutes.

== Route and halts ==
The important halts of the train are:

- Indore Junction
- Ujjain Junction
- Shujalpur
- Bhopal Junction
- Itarsi Junction
- Ghoradongri
- Amla Junction
- Nagpur Junction
- Balharshah Junction
- Ramagundam
- Warangal
- Vijayawada Junction
- Nellore
- Gudur Junction
- Chennai Central
- Salem Junction
- Erode Junction
- Coimbatore Junction
- Palakkad Junction
- Ernakulam Town
- Ernakulam Junction
- Alappuzha
- Kollam Junction
- Thiruvananthapuram North

== Coach composition ==
The train consists of 21 standard LHB coaches as follows:

Loco	1	2	3	4	5	6	7	8	9	10	11	12	13	14	15	16	17	18	19	20	21
	SLR	UR	S1	S2	S3	S4	S5	S6	S7	S8	S9	A1	B1	B2	B3	B4	B5	B6	UR	SLR	

== Loco Link ==
earlier was WDM-3D, now it gets an WAP-7 or WDP-4D as the route entirely electrified

== See also ==
- Kochuveli–Indore Weekly Express
