= Nainpur Junction railway station =

Railway station in Madhya Pradesh, India

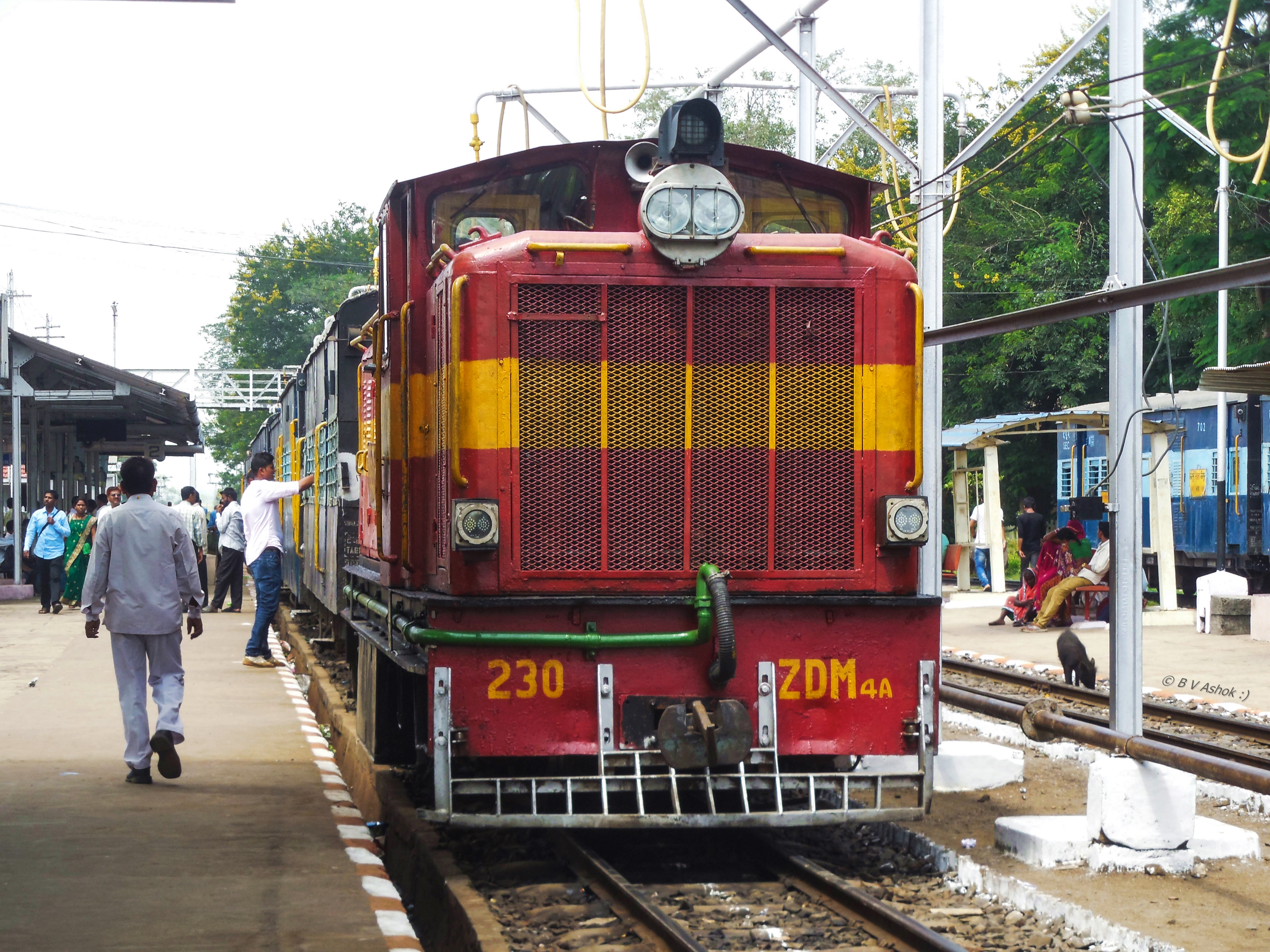
- Nainpur junction

General information
- Location: State Highway 11A, Nainpur, Madhya Pradesh; India
- Coordinates: 22.4257°N 80.1094°E
- Elevation: 446 metres (1,463 ft)
- System: Indian Railways station
- Owner: Indian Railways
- Operator: South East Central Railway
- Lines: 1.Jabalpur Gondia Line, 2. Amla Mandla Line
- Platforms: 5
- Tracks: 4 (1,676 mm or 5 ft 6 in)
- Connections: Auto stand

Construction
- Structure type: Standard (on-ground station)
- Parking: Yes

Other information
- Status: Functioning
- Station code: NIR
- Zone(s): South East Central Railway
- Division(s): Nagpur railway division
Location

Nainpur Junction railway station is a railway station in Mandla District, Madhya Pradesh. Its code is NIR. It serves the town of Nainpur.

Nainpur was a railway hub on the narrow-gauge (2 ft 6 in (762 mm)) line. This was the junction point of Jabalpur 110 km to its north, Balaghat 76 km to its south, Mandla 50 km to its east and Chhindwara 150 km to its west. It is connected to Nagpur via Chhindwara and Gondia.

The station was Asia's largest narrow-gauge railway junction before the recent conversion to broad gauge. Presently, Mandla-Nainpur-Chhindwara tracks also has been converted to broad-gauge. The Jabalpur–Nainpur-Gondia track has been fully converted to broad gauge.

Currently some trains have started on this route. Raipur to Jabalpur Intercity Express (Train No. 11701 / Mook Mati Express) & Nainpur (NIR) to Indore (INDB) Panchvalley Express (Train No. 19344) are some of daily express trains.
