= Budhni railway station =

Railway station in Madhya Pradesh, India

Budhni

General information
- Location: Budhni, Madhya Pradesh; India
- Coordinates: 22.786786°N 77.681145°E
- Elevation: 311 m (1,020 ft)
- System: Indian Railway Station
- Owner: Indian Railways
- Operator: Western Central Railway
- Line: Bhopal–Nagpur section
- Platforms: 2
- Tracks: 4
- Connections: Taxi stand, auto stand

Construction
- Structure type: Standard (on ground station)
- Parking: Available
- Cycle facilities: Available
- Accessible: Disabled access

Other information
- Status: Active
- Station code: BNI
- Zone(s): West Central Railway
- Division(s): Bhopal
Location
- Location within Madhya Pradesh Location within India

Budhni railway station is a small station located in Budhni town, Madhya Pradesh. Its code is BNI. The station consist of two platforms. The platforms are not well sheltered. It lacks many facilities including water and sanitation.

Budhni station is a part of Bhopal–Nagpur section and is well connected to Chhindwara, Indore, Bhopal, Gorakhpur Junction, Jhansi, Itarsi, Amritsar and Mumbai.

A new 205.5 km railway line connecting Budni to Indore (Mangaliyagaon) in Madhya Pradesh has been approved by the Cabinet Committee on Economic Affairs.
