= Maksi Junction railway station =

Railway station in Madhya Pradesh, India

Maksi Junction

General information
- Location: Maksi, Shajapur district, Madhya Pradesh; India
- Coordinates: 23°15′08″N 76°09′31″E
- Elevation: 513 metres (1,683 ft)
- System: Indian Railways station
- Owner: Indian Railways
- Operator: Western Railway
- Lines: Ruthiyai-Maksi section Ujjain–Bhopal section Dewas-Maksi section
- Platforms: 3
- Tracks: 4
- Connections: Auto stand

Construction
- Structure type: Standard (on ground station)
- Parking: No
- Cycle facilities: No

Other information
- Status: Functioning
- Station code: MKC
- Zone(s): Western Railway
- Division(s): Ratlam

Services
Preceding station	Indian Railways	Following station
Terminus	West Central Railway zone Ruthiyai-Maksi section	Siroliya towards ?
Donta towards ?	Western Railway zone Dewas-Maksi section	Terminus
Tarana Road towards ?	Western Railway zone Ujjain-Bhopal section	Pir Umrod towards ?
Location
- Interactive map

Maksi Junction railway station is a railway station in Shajapur district of Madhya Pradesh. Its code is MKC. It serves Maksi city. The station consists of three platforms. It lacks many facilities including water and sanitation. Passenger, Express and Superfast trains halt here.

== Major trains ==
These trains have stoppage at Maksi Junction railway station:

Number	Train	To	Type
12913/14	Indore–Nagpur Tri Shatabdi Express	Nagpur	Express
12923/24	Indore–Nagpur Express	Nagpur	Superfast
14317/18	Indore–Dehradun Express	Dehradun	Express
14319/20	Indore–Bareilly Weekly Express	Bareilly	Express
18233/34	Narmada Express	Bilaspur	Express
19303/04	Indore–Bhopal Express	Bhopal	Express
19305/06	Indore–Kamakhya Weekly Express	Kamakhya	Express
19307/08	Indore–Chandigarh Express	Chandigarh	Express
19317/18	Indore–Puri Humsafar Express	Puri	Humsafar
19321/22	Indore–Patna Express	Rajendra Nagar Terminal (Patna)	Express
19325/26	Indore–Amritsar Express	Amritsar	Express
22191/92	Jabalpur–Indore Overnight Express	Jabalpur	Superfast
22645/46	Ahilyanagari Express	Thiruvananthapuram	Superfast
22911/12	Shipra Express	Howrah	Superfast
22983/84	Indore–Kota Intercity Express	Kota	Express
