= Chintaman Ganesh railway station =

Railway station in Madhya Pradesh

Chintaman Ganesh
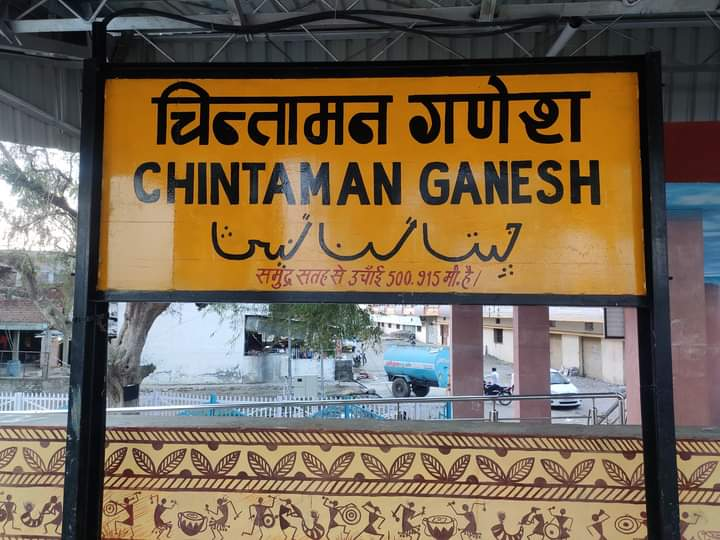
- Station Board

General information
- Location: Ujjain, Madhya Pradesh; India
- Coordinates: 23.1461°N 75.7409°E
- Elevation: 503 m (1,650 ft)
- System: Indian Railways station
- Owner: Indian Railways
- Operator: Ratlam division
- Lines: Akola-Ratlam line (material modification)
- Platforms: 2
- Tracks: 3
- Connections: Taxi stand, Auto stand

Construction
- Structure type: Standard (on-ground station)
- Parking: Available
- Cycle facilities: Available
- Accessible: Disabled access

Other information
- Station code: CNN
- Fare zone: Western Railway

History
- Rebuilt: 2021
- Electrified: 2021

Services
Preceding station	Indian Railways	Following station
Lekoda towards ?	Western Railway zone Fatehabad Chandrawatiganj-Ujjain section	Sipra Bridge towards ?
Location
- Interactive map

Chintaman Ganesh railway station is a small railway station in Ujjain, Madhya Pradesh, which is built near the Chintaman Ganesh Temple. Its code is CNN. This railway station is built across the Shipra River on the Ujjain–Fatehabad broad-gauge railway line. The station consists of double platform. The platform is well sheltered. The main railway station of Ujjain, Ujjain Junction, is always preferred over Chintaman Ganesh station for catching several trains.

In 2014, the station was closed due to gauge conversion of the Ujjain–Fatehabad line from meter gauge to broad gauge.

This railway station was re-opened in 2021, after the gauge conversion of the Ujjain - Fatehabad was completed, several amenities were also added to it.

== See also ==
- Ujjain Junction
- Ujjain
- Indore
