= Barlai railway station =

Railway station in Madhya Pradesh, India

Barlai

General information
- Location: Barlai Jagir, Indore district, Madhya Pradesh; India
- Coordinates: 22°53′39″N 75°57′44″E
- Elevation: 518 m (1,699 ft)
- System: Passenger train station
- Owner: Indian Railways
- Operator: Western Railway
- Line: Indore–Gwalior line
- Platforms: 2
- Tracks: 2

Construction
- Structure type: Standard (on ground station)

Other information
- Status: Active
- Station code: BLAX
- Zone(s): Western Railway zone
- Division(s): Ratlam

History
- Opened: 1899

Services
Preceding station	Indian Railways	Following station
Binjana towards ?	Western Railway zone Indore–Gwalior line	Dakacha towards ?
Location
- Interactive map

Barlai railway station is a railway station on Indore–Gwalior line under the Ratlam railway division of Western Railway zone. This is situated at Barlai Jagir in Indore district of the Indian state of Madhya Pradesh.
