= Dewas Junction railway station =

Railway station in Madhya Pradesh, India

Dewas Junction
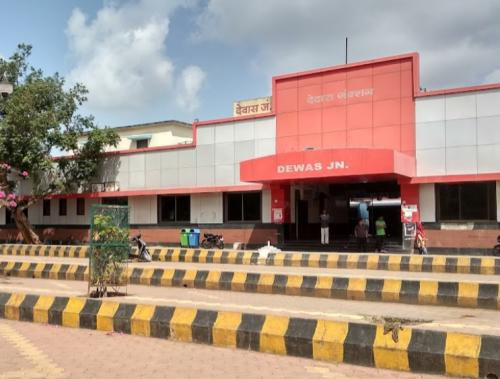
- Dewas Junction

General information
- Location: Dewas, Madhya Pradesh; India
- Coordinates: 22°58′41″N 76°03′07″E
- Elevation: 537 m (1,762 ft)
- System: Indian Railway station
- Owner: Indian Railways
- Operator: Western Railway
- Lines: Indore-Dewas-Ujjain section, Dewas-Maksi section
- Platforms: 3 for passenger and 2 for goods train
- Tracks: 5
- Connections: Taxi Stand, Auto Stand

Construction
- Platform levels: 1
- Parking: Yes
- Cycle facilities: Yes
- Accessible: Disabled access

Other information
- Status: In Service
- Station code: DWX
- Zone(s): Western Railway
- Division(s): Ratlam
- Classification: NSG-4
Route map
Location
- Interactive map

Dewas Junction railway station (station code:- DWX) is the main railway station of Dewas city in the western part of Madhya Pradesh situated on Indore-Dewas-Ujjain section. It serves Dewas city. The station consists of three platforms.

== History ==
Dewas railway station lies on the Indore–Ujjain railway line, which formed part of the Scindia–Neemuch Railway. The railway connection between Indore and Ujjain was opened in stages, with the Indore–Ujjain branch opened to traffic in 1876 and the line completed during 1879–80.

The railway system was subsequently reorganised. The Scindia–Neemuch Railway was amalgamated with other state railways under the Rajputana–Malwa Railway in 1881–82, and its management was subsequently taken over by the Bombay, Baroda and Central India Railway in 1885.

Dewas subsequently became a junction with the construction of the Dewas–Maksi railway line. The Godhra–Indore–Dewas–Maksi new-line project was included in the Railway Budget in 1989–90. Work on the Dewas–Maksi section was undertaken in phases and the 36-kilometre section was completed and commissioned by 2003.

A subsequent report of the Comptroller and Auditor General of India records that the Dewas–Maksi new line was opened for traffic in November 2002. The report also states that work on the section had initially commenced in 1989–90, was subsequently frozen, and was restarted in September 1996.

The Dewas–Maksi connection gave Dewas a direct railway connection towards Maksi, linking the station with the Ujjain–Bhopal section and the wider railway network towards central India.

== Connectivity ==
Dewas Junction is connected with Ujjain Junction to the north west, Indore Junction to the south-west, Maksi Junction to the north.

== Major trains ==
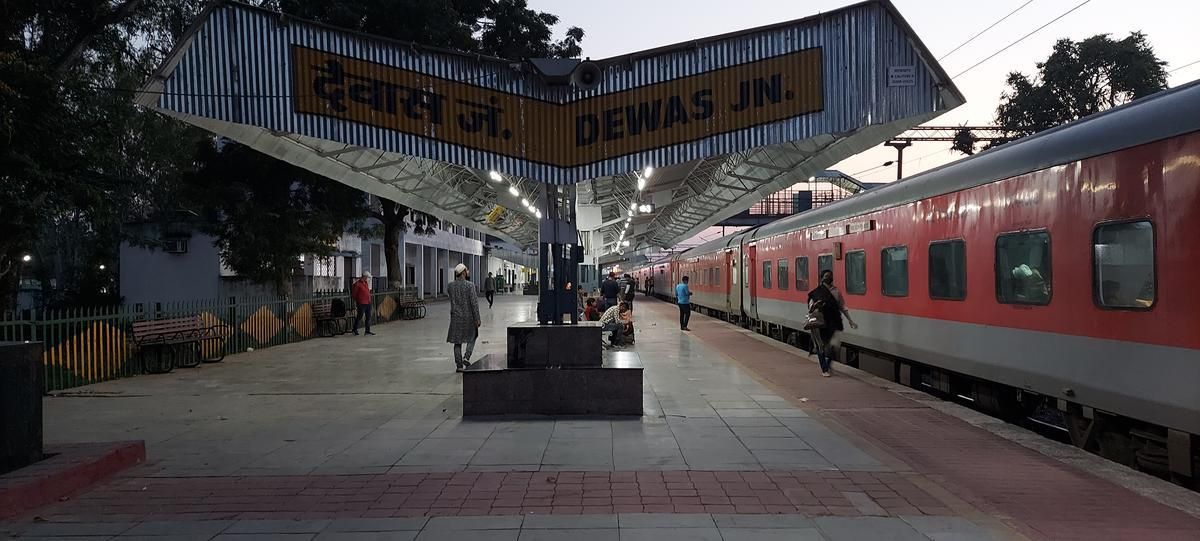

These trains have stoppage at Dewas Junction railway station:

Number	Train	To	Type
12227/28	Mumbai Central–Indore Duronto Express	Mumbai Central	Duronto
12415/16	Indore–New Delhi Intercity Express	New Delhi	Superfast
12465/66	Ranthambore Express	Jodhpur	Superfast
12913/14	Indore–Nagpur Tri Shatabdi Express	Nagpur	Express
12923/24	Indore–Nagpur Express	Nagpur	Superfast
12961/62	Avantika Express	Mumbai Central	Superfast
14317/18	Indore–Dehradun Express	Dehradun	Express
14319/20	Indore–Bareilly Weekly Express	Bareilly	Express
18233/34	Narmada Express	Bilaspur	Express
19303/04	Indore–Bhopal Express	Bhopal	Express
19305/06	Indore–Kamakhya Weekly Express	Kamakhya	Express
19307/08	Indore–Chandigarh Express	Chandigarh	Express
19309/10	Shanti Express	Gandhinagar	Express
19315/16	Lingampalli–Indore Humsafar Express	Lingampalli	Humsafar
19317/18	Indore–Puri Humsafar Express	Puri	Humsafar
19319/20	Veraval–Indore Mahamana Express	Veraval	Mahamana
19321/22	Indore–Patna Express	Rajendra Nagar Terminal (Patna)	Express
19325/26	Indore–Amritsar Express	Amritsar	Express
19329/30	Veer Bhumi Chittaurgarh Express	Asarva	Express
19331/32	Kochuveli–Indore Weekly Express	Kochuveli	Express
19333/34	Indore–Bikaner Mahamana Express	Bikaner	Mahamana
19335/36	Gandhidham–Indore Weekly Express	Gandhidham	Express
19337/38	Indore–Delhi Sarai Rohilla Weekly Express	Delhi Sarai Rohilla	Express
22191/92	Jabalpur–Indore Overnight Express	Jabalpur	Superfast
22645/46	Ahilyanagari Express	Thiruvananthapuram	Superfast
22911/12	Shipra Express	Howrah	Superfast
22983/84	Indore–Kota Intercity Express	Kota	Express

== See also ==
- Ujjain Junction
- Bhopal Junction
- Indore Junction
- Maksi Junction
- Binjana
