= WFDC2 =

Protein-coding gene in the species Homo sapiens

Identifiers
- Aliases: WFDC2, EDDM4, HE4, WAP5, dJ461P17.6, WAP four-disulfide core domain 2
- External IDs: OMIM: 617548; MGI: 1914951; GeneCards: WFDC2

Gene location (Human)
Chr.	Chromosome 20 (human)
Band	20q13.12	Start	45,469,753 bp
Band	20q13.12	End	45,481,532 bp

Gene location (Mouse)
Chr.	Chromosome 2 (mouse)
Band	2|2 H3	Start	164,404,333 bp
Band	2|2 H3	End	164,410,430 bp
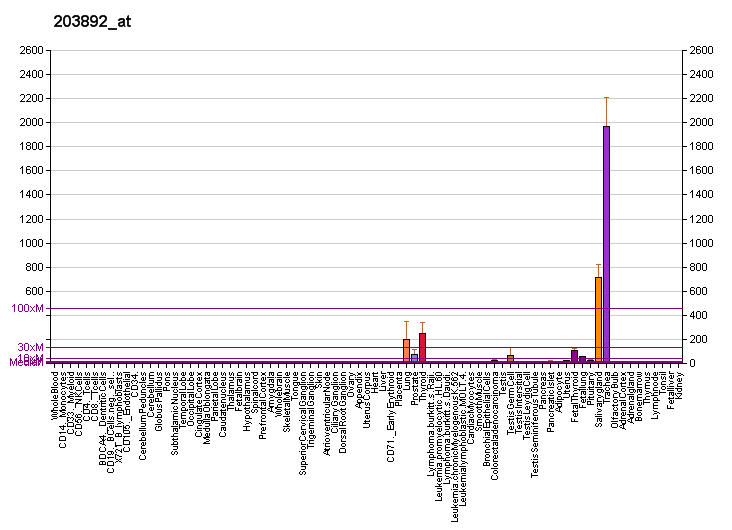
RNA expression pattern
Bgee	Human / Mouse (ortholog); Top expressed in: olfactory zone of nasal mucosa; nasal epithelium; right uterine tube; epithelium of bronchus; bronchial epithelial cell; right lobe of thyroid gland; left lobe of thyroid gland; palpebral conjunctiva; corpus epididymis; trachea / Top expressed in: right lung lobe; transitional epithelium of urinary bladder; left lung; left colon; cervix; olfactory epithelium; left lung lobe; medullary collecting duct; right kidney; embryo; More reference expression data
BioGPS	More reference expression data
Gene ontology
Molecular function	aspartic-type endopeptidase inhibitor activity; peptidase inhibitor activity; endopeptidase inhibitor activity; serine-type endopeptidase inhibitor activity; cysteine-type endopeptidase inhibitor activity
Cellular component	extracellular region; extracellular exosome; extracellular space
Biological process	negative regulation of peptidase activity; proteolysis; spermatogenesis; negative regulation of endopeptidase activity
Sources:Amigo / QuickGO
Orthologs
Databases	NCBI: entry; OMA: entry
Species	Human	Mouse
Entrez	10406	67701
Ensembl	ENSG00000101443	ENSMUSG00000017723
UniProt	Q14508	Q9DAU7
RefSeq (mRNA)	NM_006103; NM_080733; NM_080734; NM_080735; NM_080736	NM_026323; NM_001374655
RefSeq (protein)	NP_006094	NP_080599; NP_001361584
Location (UCSC)	Chr 20: 45.47 – 45.48 Mb	Chr 2: 164.4 – 164.41 Mb
PubMed search
- Wikidata
View/Edit Human	View/Edit Mouse

WAP four-disulfide core domain protein 2 - also known as Human Epididymis Protein 4 (HE4) - is a protein that in humans is encoded by the WFDC2 gene.

HE4 is a tumor marker of ovarian cancer, with 80% sensitivity and 99% specificity at a cut-off of 150 pmol/L.

== Function ==
This gene encodes a protein that is a member of the WFDC domain family. The WFDC domain, or WAP Signature motif, contains eight cysteines forming four disulfide bonds at the core of the protein, and functions as a protease inhibitor in many family members. This gene is expressed in pulmonary epithelial cells among other tissues, and was also found to be expressed in some ovarian cancers. The encoded protein is a small secretory protein, which may be involved in sperm maturation.
