= Sehore railway station =

Railway station in Madhya Pradesh

Sehore

General information
- Location: Sehore, Madhya Pradesh; India
- Coordinates: 23°12′53″N 77°04′41″E
- Elevation: 502 metres (1,647 ft)
- System: Indian Railways station
- Owner: Indian Railways
- Operator: Western Railway
- Line: Ujjain–Bhopal section
- Platforms: 2
- Tracks: 4
- Connections: Auto stand

Construction
- Structure type: Standard (on-ground station)
- Parking: Yes

Other information
- Status: Functioning
- Station code: SEH
- Zone(s): Western Railway
- Division(s): Ratlam

Services
Preceding station	Indian Railways	Following station
Baktal towards ?	Western Railway zone Ujjain–Bhopal section	Pachwan towards ?
Location
- Location within India Location within Madhya Pradesh

Sehore railway station is a main railway station in Sehore district, Madhya Pradesh. Its code is SEH. It serves Sehore city. The station consists of two platforms.
