= Jabri =

- Town and union council
- Interactive map of Jabri
- Coordinates: 34°4′0″N 73°5′0″E
- Country: Pakistan
- Region: Khyber Pakhtunkhwa
- District: Haripur District
- Time zone: UTC+5 (PST)

Jabri is one of the 44 union councils, administrative subdivisions, of Haripur District in the Khyber Pakhtunkhwa province of Pakistan. It is located east of the district capital, Haripur, at 34°4′0″N 73°5′0″E and is situated about 70km away from Islamabad.

== Administration ==
The Union Council of Jabri contains eight villages:

- Akhora
- Bandi
- Budhar
- Darkot
- Dhakan Paisar
- Jabri
- Kohala Nallah
- Lanjiyaan Syedaan
- Tayal
