= Bercha =

Village in India

Bherchha is a village and former Rajput jagir (feudal estate) in Nagda Tehsil, Ujjain district, in the state of Madhya Pradesh, India.

Berchha is famous for the Nag Maharaj temple. Every month Panchami is celebrated here.

There is a Berchha lake in Mhow where Army runs a Berchha Watermanship Training Area. It also has a Bercha Field Firing Range.
