= Kalapipal =

- village
- Location within Madhya Pradesh Location within India
- Coordinates: 23.682370°N 77.241740°E
- Country: India
- State: Madhya Pradesh
- District: Bhopal
- Tehsil: Berasia

Population (2011)
  - Total: 306
- Time zone: UTC+5:30 (IST)
- ISO 3166 code: IN-MP
- Census code: 482101

Kalapipal is a village in the Bhopal district of Madhya Pradesh, India. It is located in the Berasia tehsil.

== Demographics ==
According to the 2011 census of India, Kalapipal has 67 households. The effective literacy rate (i.e. the literacy rate of population excluding children aged 6 and below) is 66.92%.

Demographics (2011 Census)
	Total	Male	Female
Population	306	161	145
Children aged below 6 years	46	23	23
Scheduled caste	305	161	144
Scheduled tribe	0	0	0
Literates	174	106	68
Workers (all)	136	85	51
Main workers (total)	130	82	48
Main workers: Cultivators	96	60	36
Main workers: Agricultural labourers	23	15	8
Main workers: Household industry workers	0	0	0
Main workers: Other	11	7	4
Marginal workers (total)	6	3	3
Marginal workers: Cultivators	1	1	0
Marginal workers: Agricultural labourers	3	2	1
Marginal workers: Household industry workers	0	0	0
Marginal workers: Others	2	0	2
Non-workers	170	76	94
