= Indore–Dewas–Ujjain section =

Railway line in India

Overview
- Status: Partially operational
- Owner: Indian Railway
- Locale: Madhya Pradesh
- Termini: Indore Junction; Ujjain Junction

Service
- System: Western Railway
- Operator: Ratlam railway division

Technical
- Track length: 79 km (49 mi)
- Number of tracks: 2
- Track gauge: 5 ft 6 in (1,676 mm) broad gauge
- Electrification: Yes
- Operating speed: 100 km/h (62 mph)

The Indore–Dewas–Ujjain section of the Western Railway zone is a partially operational public transit system in the state of Madhya Pradesh. It connects Indore Junction with Ujjain Junction on Ujjain–Bhopal section and Dewas Junction on Dewas–Maksi section. It is currently operational as a single-track electrified railway line, and is undergoing doubling.

The tentative time of completion of the project is slated to be March 2023. The work is being done by Ratlam railway division of Western Railways.

== History ==
The track was part of the erstwhile Scindia–Neemuch railway, a branch line from Indore to Ujjain was made operational in the period 1879-1880 during the British Rule.

== Current status ==
The doubling work in the stretch of railways from Ujjain Junction via Karchha, Dewas Junction, Barlai has been completed and is in operation since late February 2023.

== See also ==
- Western Railway
- Indore Junction
- Dewas Junction
- Ujjain Junction
