= Shujalpur railway station =

Railway station in Madhya Pradesh

Shujalpur

General information
- Location: Shujalpur, Madhya Pradesh; India
- Coordinates: 23°22′50″N 76°43′24″E
- Elevation: 455 metres (1,493 ft)
- System: Indian Railways station
- Owner: Indian Railways
- Operator: Western Railway
- Line: Ujjain–Bhopal section
- Platforms: 3
- Tracks: 4
- Connections: Auto stand

Construction
- Structure type: Standard (on-ground station)
- Parking: Yes

Other information
- Status: Functioning
- Station code: SJP
- Zone(s): Western Railway
- Division(s): Ratlam

Services
| Preceding station | Indian Railways | Following station |
|---|---|---|
| Mohammadkhera towards ? | Western Railway zone Ujjain–Bhopal section | Chakrod towards ? |
Location
- Location within India Location within Madhya Pradesh

Shujalpur railway station is a railway station in Shajapur district, Madhya Pradesh. Its code is SJP. It serves Shujalpur city. The station consists of three platforms. The platforms are well sheltered and have many facilities, including water, parking, foot overbridge, Coach Indication display etc
