= Nagda Junction railway station =

Railway station in Madhya Pradesh

Nagda Junction
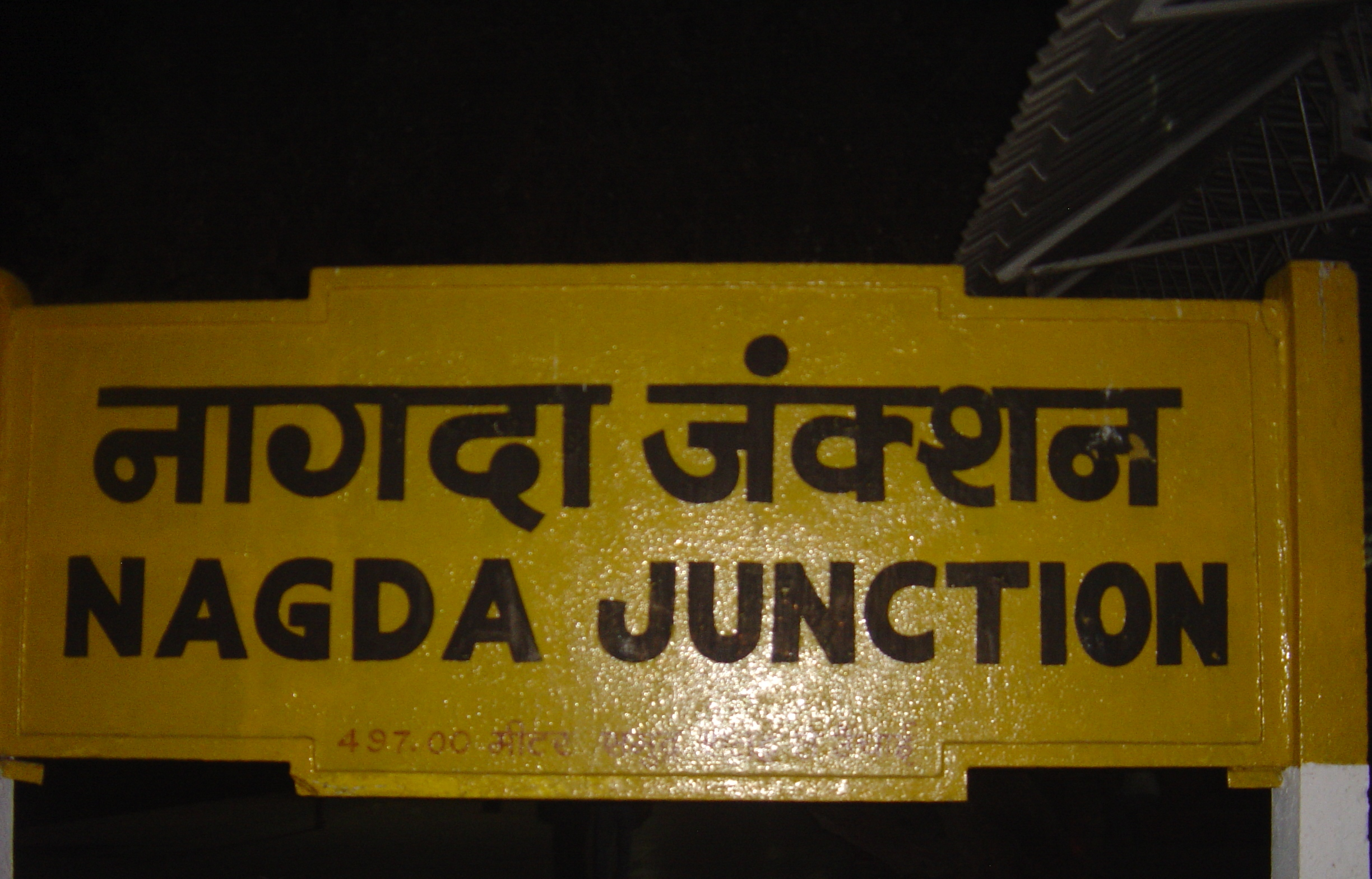

General information
- Location: Kilkipura Juna, Nagda, Ujjain district, Madhya Pradesh; India
- Coordinates: 23.4558°N 75.4129°E
- Elevation: 468 metres (1,535 ft)
- System: Indian Railways station
- Owner: Indian Railways
- Operator: Western Railway
- Lines: New Delhi–Mumbai main line, Kota–Nagda–Ratlam section; Nagda–Ujjain section
- Platforms: 5
- Tracks: 10

Construction
- Structure type: Standard (on-ground station)
- Parking: Yes

Other information
- Status: Functioning
- Station code: NAD
- Zone(s): Western Railway
- Division(s): Ratlam
- Website: www.mynagda.com
Location
- Location within Madhya Pradesh Location within India

Nagda Junction is a major railway station of Western Railway network. Nagda Junction is A – category railway station of Western Railway Zone of Indian Railways. Its code is NAD. It serves Nagda town. The station consists of five platforms.

It is an important halt for all trains that are bound for Mumbai, Delhi, Pune, Indore, Bhopal, Jabalpur, Jodhpur, Jaipur, Bikaner, Bilaspur, Dehradun, Amritsar, Chandigarh, Hyderabad, Chennai, Bengaluru, Mysore, Patna, Kanpur, Lucknow, Gorakhpur, Muzaffarpur, Varanasi, Darbhanga, Guwahati, New Bongaigaon Junction, Kolkata, Katra, Nagpur, Ahmedabad and Somnath.

== Gallery ==
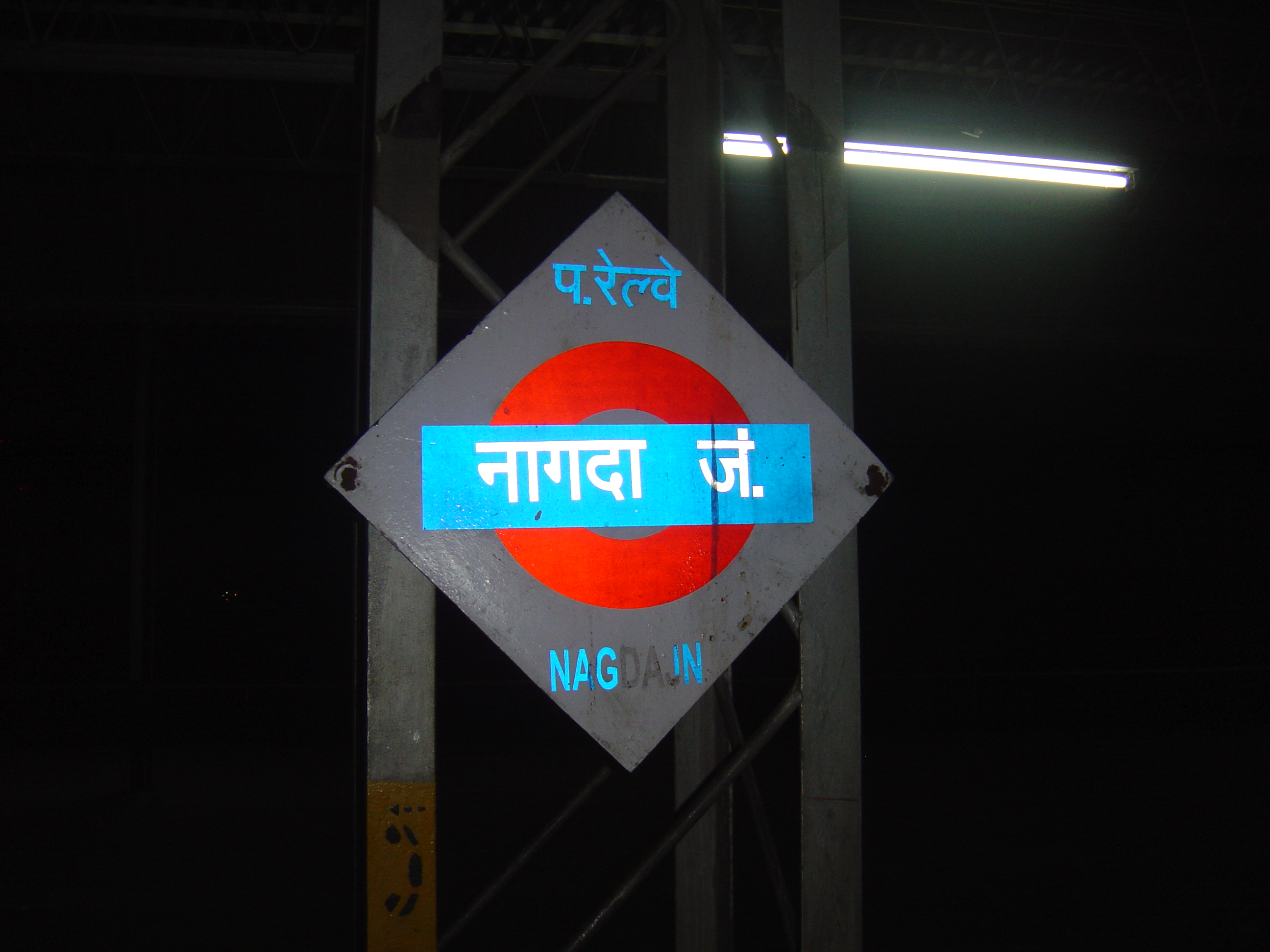
Nagda Junction – Platform board

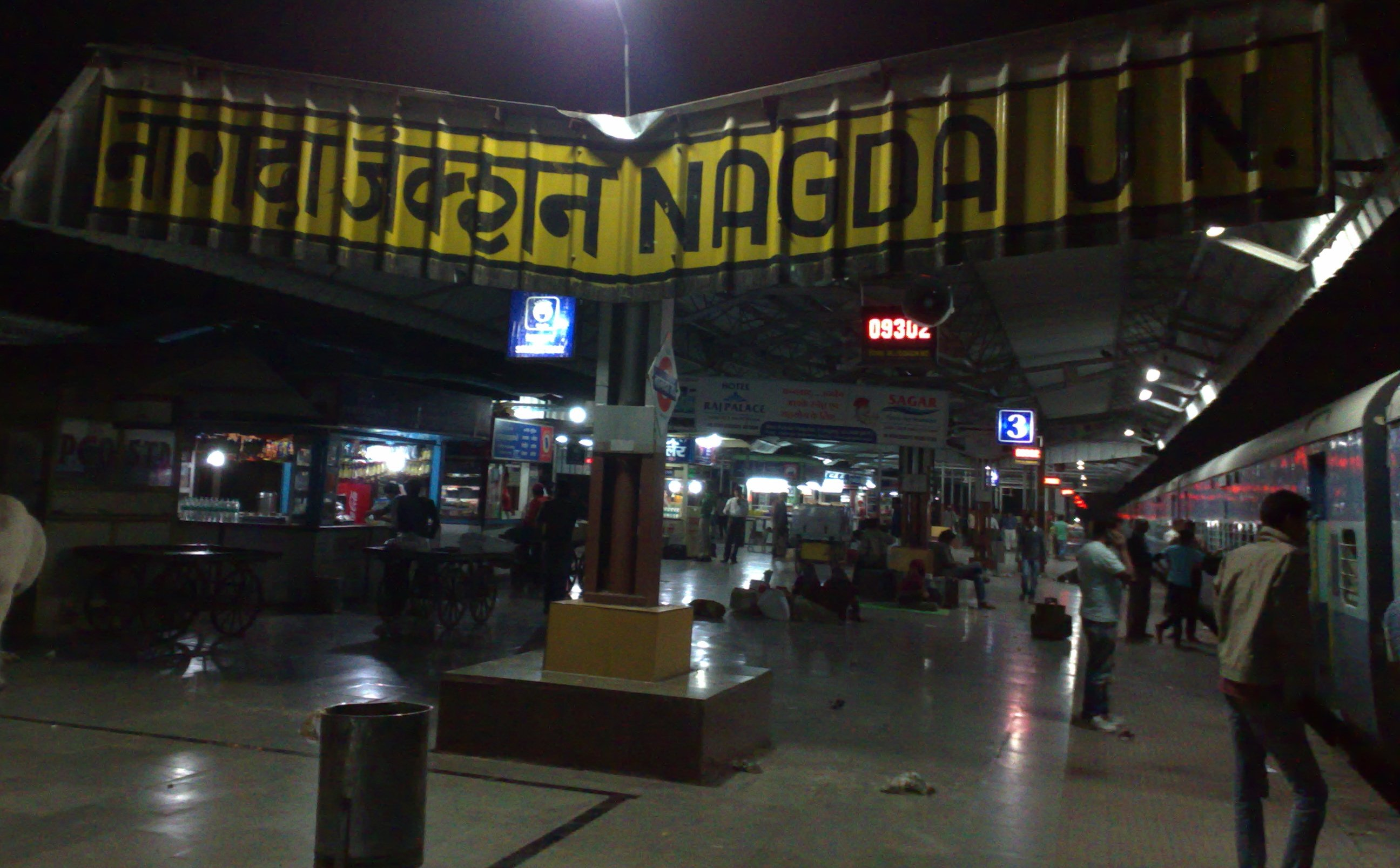
Nagda Junction

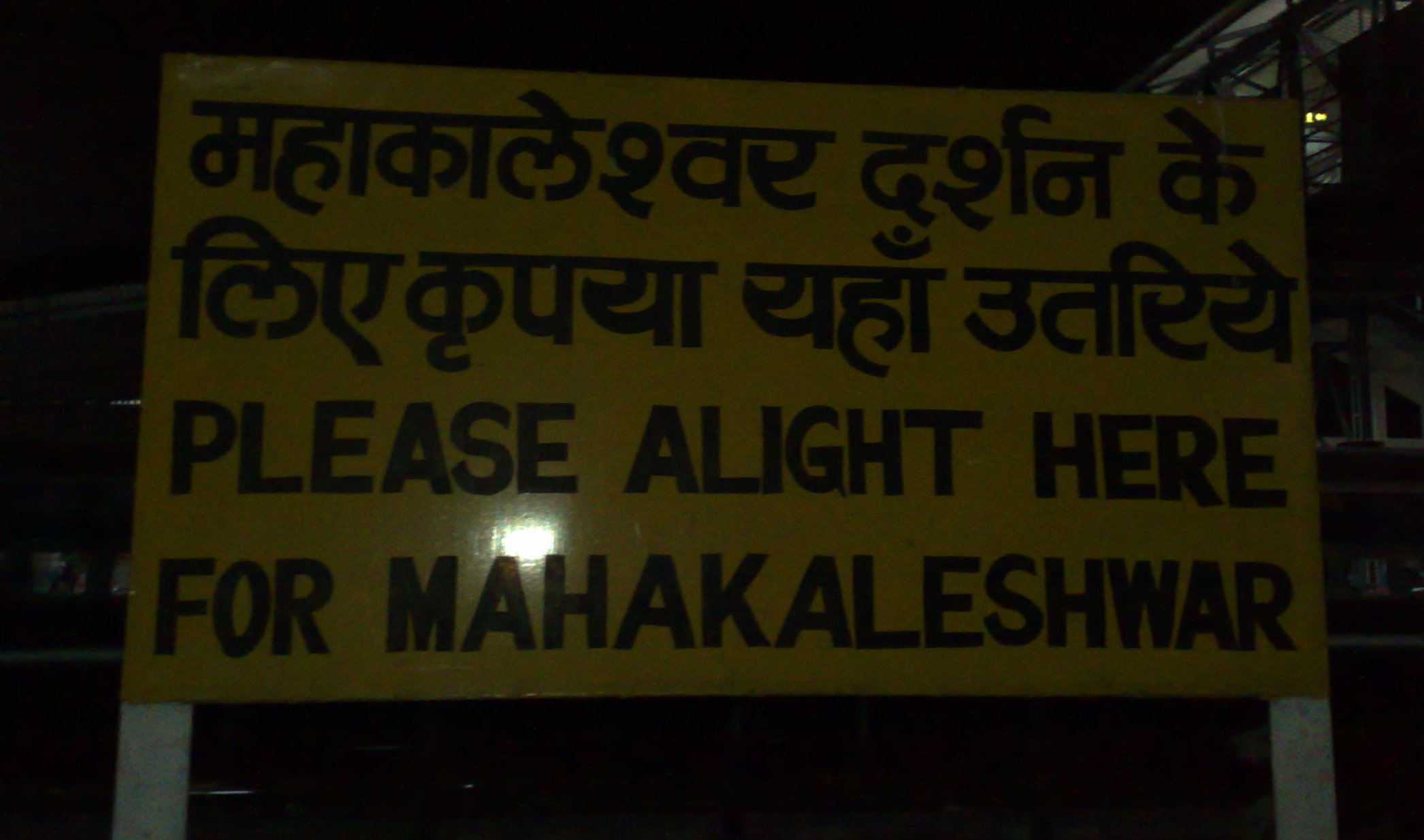
Nagda Junction – Information board
