= Ujjain–Bhopal section =

Rail station in India

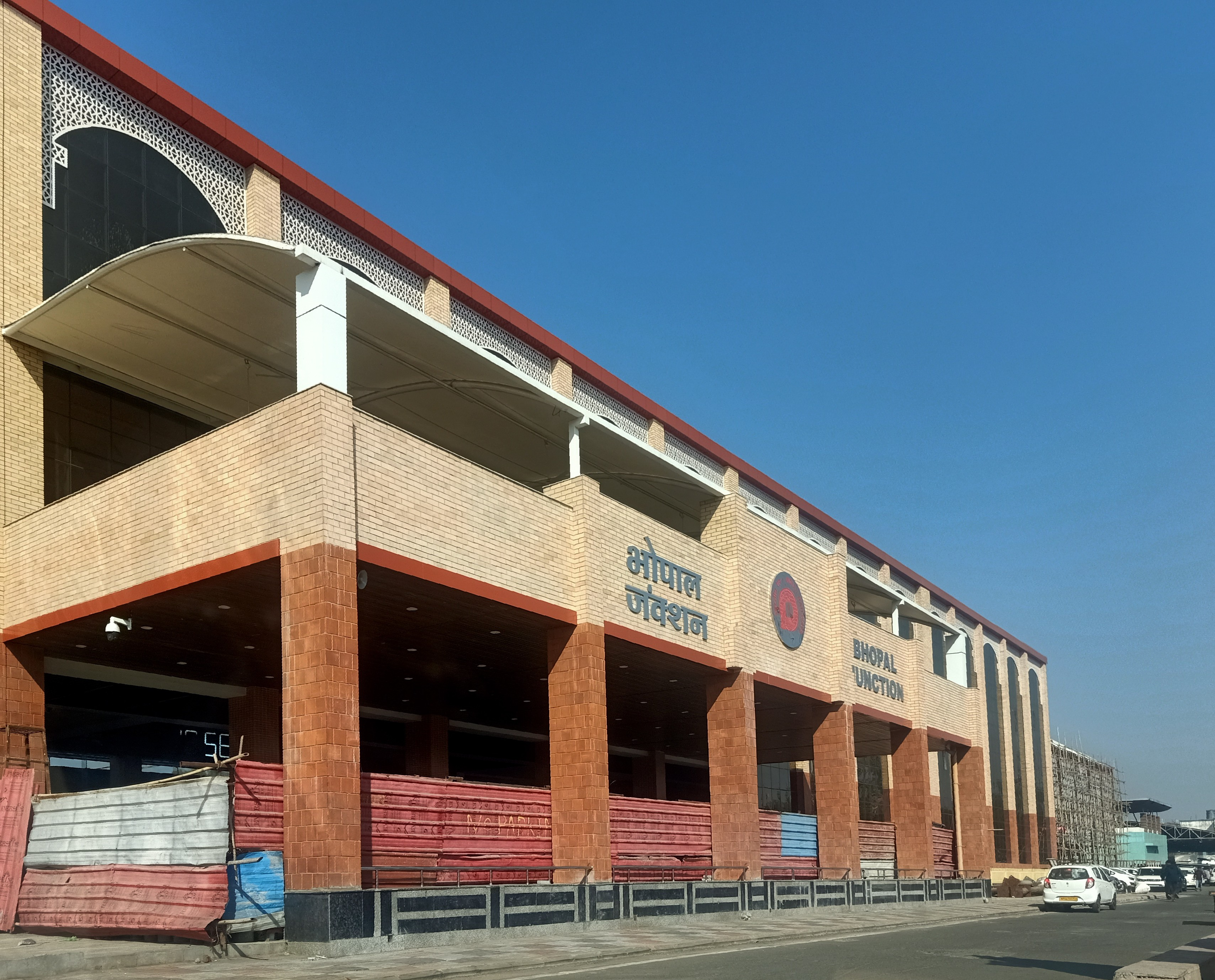
- Bhopal Junction

Overview
- Status: Operational
- Owner: Indian Railways
- Locale: Madhya Pradesh
- Termini: Ujjain; Bhopal
- Stations: 23

Service
- Operator(s): Western Railway; West Central Railway

Technical
- Track length: 183 km (114 mi)
- Number of tracks: 2
- Track gauge: 5 ft 6 in (1,676 mm) Broad gauge
- Electrification: Yes

The Ujjain–Bhopal section is under the jurisdiction of Western Railway and West Central Railway. The length of Ujjain–Bhopal section is 183 km.

== History ==
In 1895, The Ujjain–Bhopal section was opened by Bombay, Baroda and Central India Railway. Doubling of Ujjain–Maksi section and Maksi–Bhopal section (except 54 km) was completed during 1964-65 and 1993-2001 respectively. Doubling of Kalapipal-Phanda section (except 5.83 km), Akodia-Shujalpur section and Parbati-Baktal section was completed during 2003–08, 2005–10 and 2012–13 respectively.

The branch of Ujjain-Tajpur, Tajpur-Maksi and Maksi-Bolai was electrified during 1990–91. The branch of Bolai-Shujalpur, Shujalpur-Kalapipal, Kalapipal-Sehore and Sehore-Bhopal was electrified during 1991-92 respectively.
