= Indore Junction railway station =

Railway station in Madhya Pradesh, India

Indore Junction
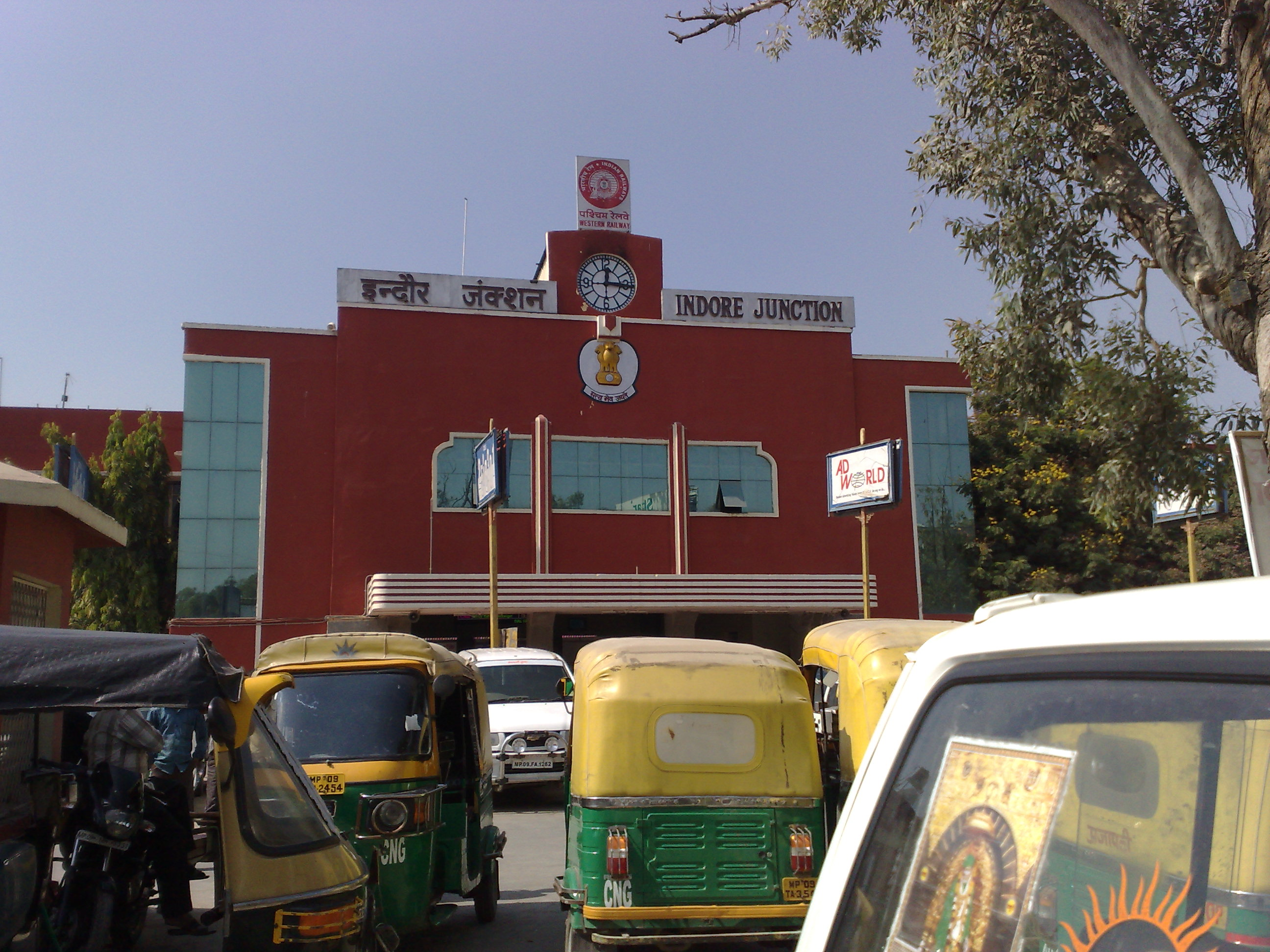
- Indore Junction railway station

General information
- Location: Indore, Madhya Pradesh; India
- Coordinates: 22°43′00″N 75°52′04″E
- Elevation: 550.20 m (1,805 ft)
- System: Indian Railway station
- Owner: Indian Railways
- Operator: Ratlam railway division, Western Railway
- Lines: Akola-Ratlam line, Gwalior Indore Manmad line, Indore-Dahod line , Indore–Budhni line
- Platforms: 4 + 2 (Park Road)
- Tracks: 06
- Connections: Yellow Line Indore Railway Station, Bus stop, iBus, Taxi stand, Auto stand, E-rickshaw

Construction
- Structure type: Standard (on-ground station)
- Platform levels: 01
- Parking: Available
- Cycle facilities: Available
- Accessible: Disabled access

Other information
- Status: Active
- Station code: INDB
- Fare zone: Western Railway zone
- Classification: NSG-2

History
- Opened: 1893; 133 years ago
- Rebuilt: 1921; 105 years ago
- Electrified: 2011; 15 years ago
- Former names: Indore Junction Metre Gauge (code: INDM)

Passengers
- 2023–24: 9,881,716

Services
Preceding station	Indore Metro	Following station
High Court towards Gandhi Nagar	Yellow Line Circular line	Rajwada towards Airport
Route map
Location
- Location within Madhya Pradesh
- Interactive map

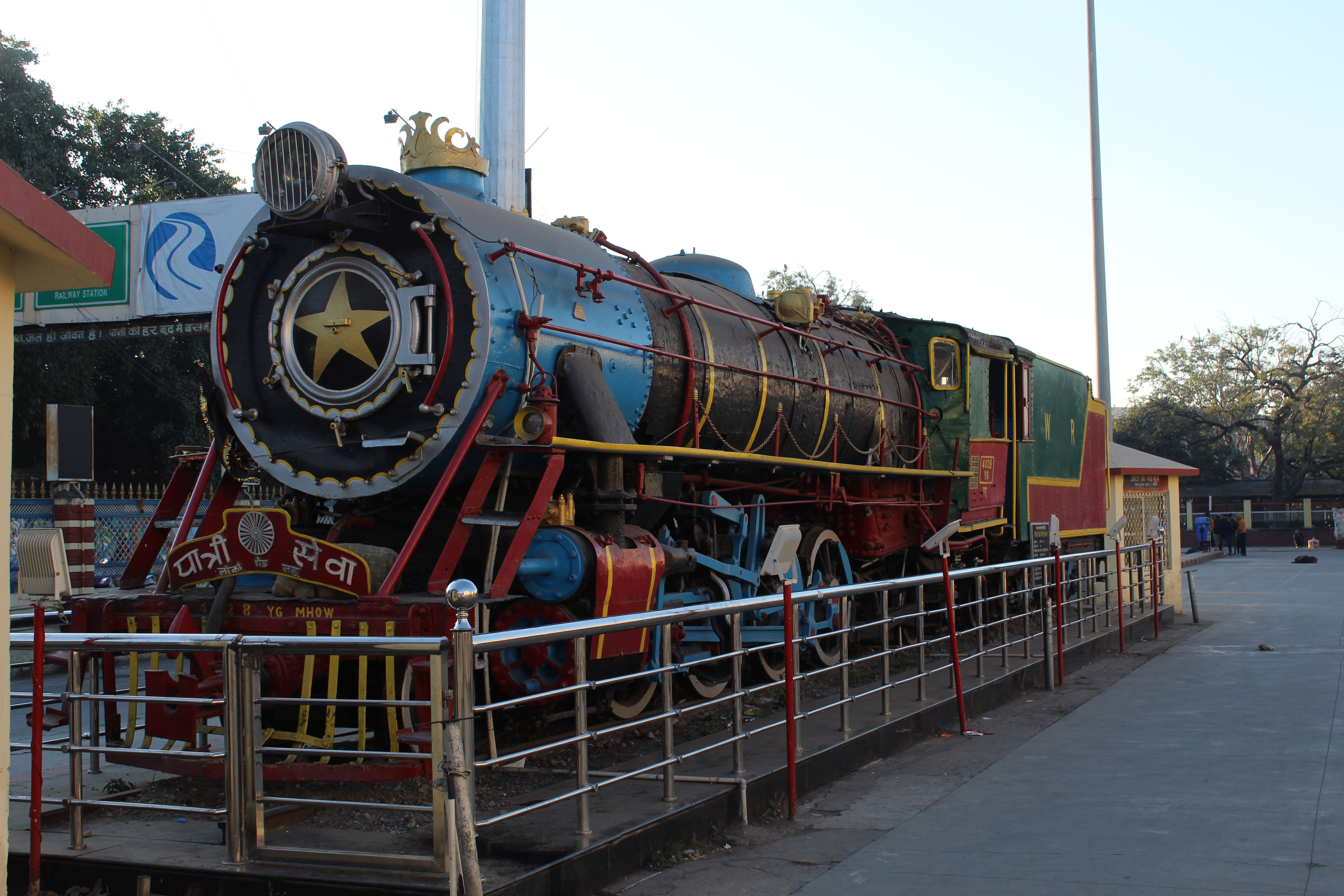

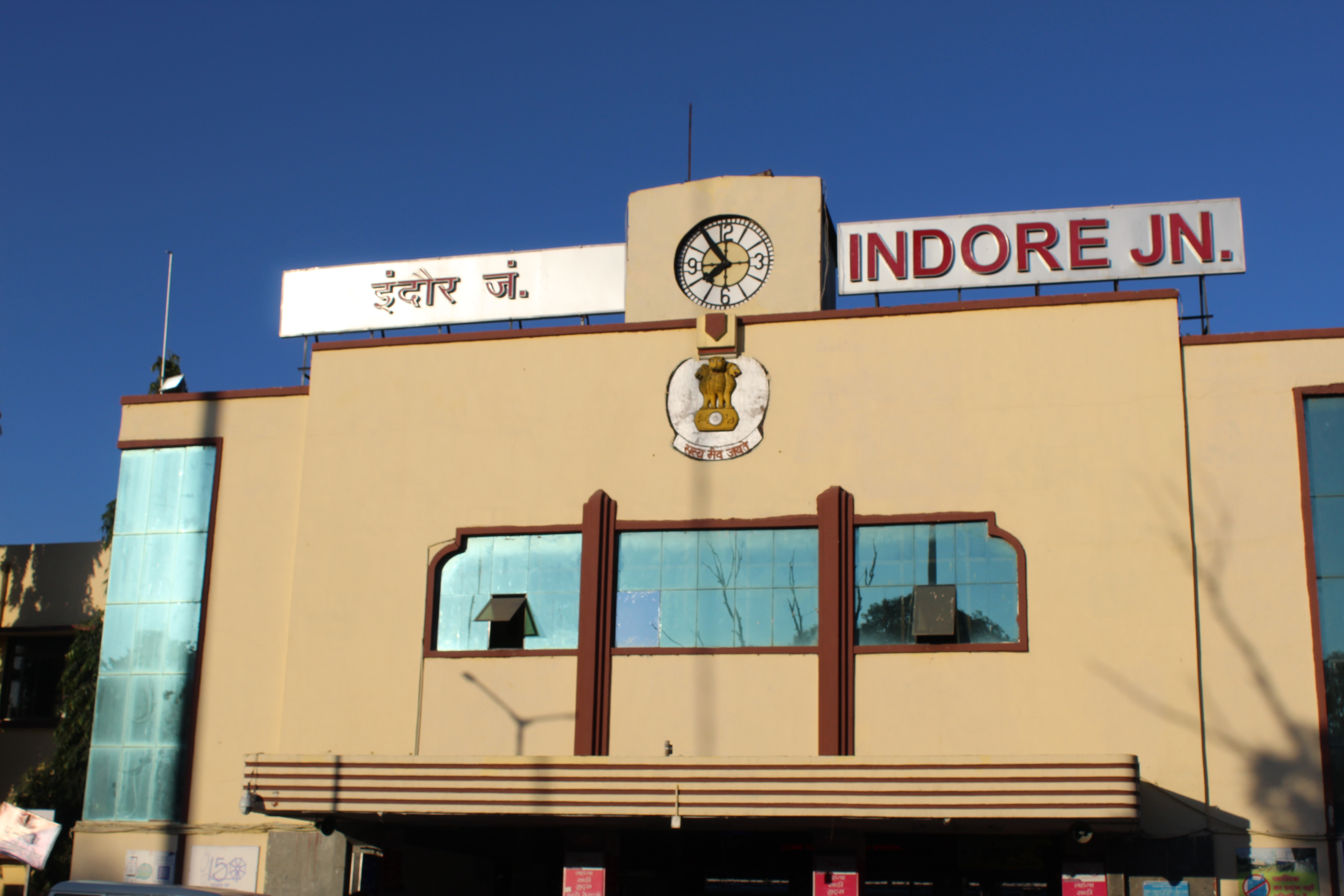

Indore Junction (station code: INDB) is one of the major Railway junctions in Madhya Pradesh and serves Indore, the commercial capital of Central India. The railway station of Indore Junction falls under the administrative control of Western Railway zone of Indian Railways. The Station is located 1 km away from the city centre. Currently the railway station has six platforms, where the first four platforms are situated in the main station and platforms 5 and 6 is situated 1.5 km away near Kamla Nehru Park, Indore.

== History ==
=== Holkar State Railway ===
His Highness the Maharajah Holkar of Indore Sawai Shri Tukojirao Holkar II, in 1870, offered a loan of £10 million sterling for the construction of a rail-line to his capital city of Indore, taking off from the Great Indian Peninsula (G.I.P.) Railway main line. A quick survey was made and Khandwa on the G.I.P. line was chosen as junction point. The alignment was to pass through Sanawad, Kheree Ghat on the Narmada River and then by way of the Choral Valley up the slopes of the Vindhyas to Indore. Maharaja Holkar's contribution accelerated the construction of rail-lines in Malwa region.

During 1870s, a rail line of Holkar State Railway was sanctioned between Khandwa and Indore passing the Mhow Ghat. The Holkar Railway required very heavy works due to very steep gradients (up to 1 in 40) on the Vindhya Ghats. It also involved digging of 4 tunnels aggregating 510 yards in length, deep cuttings and heavy retaining walls. River Narmada was crossed by a bridge of 14 spans, 197 feet each and piers 80 feet above low water level. There are 14 other large bridges with high piers, the highest pier being 152 feet above the bottom of the ravine. The first section Khandwa–Sanawad was opened for traffic on 1.12.1874. The Narmada Bridge was opened for traffic on 5.10.1876 by His Highness the Maharaja of Holkar who named it ‘Holkar-Narmada Bridge’.

=== Scindia–Neemuch Railway ===
Surveys between Indore and Neemuch started long back in 1871–72 when the plan and estimates for the whole project was submitted to the Government of India in 1872–73. Maharaja Jayajirao Scindia of Gwalior agreed to grant a loan of Rs. 7.5 million at 4 per cent per annum interest for the project and the railway was renamed as ‘Scindia–Neemuch Railway’. It also included a branch line to Ujjain from Indore. The Indore–Ujjain branch line was opened in August 1876 and the line was completed in 1879–80.

=== Bombay, Baroda and Central India Railway ===
During the period 1881-1882, the Holkar Railway and Scindia Neemuch Railway merged under a single management and were renamed Rajputana Malwa Railway. In 1882, Khandwa–Indore line extended to Ajmer. The identity of Rajputana Malwa Railway remained for a very short while and its management was taken over by Bombay, Baroda and Central India Railway Company on 1 January 1885 till 1951.

=== Western Railway ===
Indore railway station was reconstructed by B.B. & C.I.company in the year 1921. On 5 November 1951, Western Railway with its headquarters at Mumbai came into existence after merging of B.B. & C.I.Railway with the other State Railways and overtook the administration of Indore Junction. The broad-gauge portion was extended from Ujjain–Maksi–Indore in 1964–66 and the doubling of the Indore–Bhopal sections was completed in during 1993–2001.

== Facilities ==
Indore Junction is equipped with the following passenger amenities:

- Free public Wi-Fi (provided as part of RailWire, the pan-India station Wi-Fi rollout)
- Air-conditioned waiting rooms and retiring rooms, including a dedicated retiring-room facility on Platform 1
- Computerised unreserved ticket counters
- Food stalls and a shopping complex
- Automated teller machines (ATMs)
- Cloakroom/luggage facilities
- Escalators (Platforms 1 and 4) and lifts serving multiple platforms
- Parking and bicycle facilities
- Wheelchair accessibility

The station has been noted for cleanliness, including landscaped greenery between platforms, and was recognised as one of the cleanest stations in Madhya Pradesh in the Swachh Rail cleanliness surveys.

== Usage statistics ==
Indore Junction is classified as an NSG-2 category station by Indian Railways, based on passenger footfall and revenue.

Passenger and revenue data, FY 2023–24
Category	Passengers	Revenue (₹)
Reserved	4,602,328	340,11,27,164
Unreserved	5,279,388	59,81,66,102
Total	9,881,716	399,92,93,176

The station has ranked as the highest-earning railway station in the Ratlam railway division for several consecutive years, ahead of Ujjain Junction (second) and Ratlam Junction (third). By comparison, nearby Dr. Ambedkar Nagar (Mhow) railway station recorded 904,848 passengers and ₹14.19 (15¢ US) in revenue over the same period.

Indian Railways recategorises stations approximately every five years based on the previous financial year's footfall and earnings data; the above figures reflect the most recent published categorisation cycle.

== Connectivity ==
Indore Junction is directly connected to Ujjain Junction to the north-west, Dr. Ambedkar Nagar to the south, Dewas Junction to the north, and Khandwa Junction to the south-east. As a junction station on the Akola–Ratlam line and Indore–Gwalior line, it offers through connectivity within Madhya Pradesh to Bhopal, Gwalior, Jabalpur, Katni, Bina, Ratlam, and Chhindwara.

Long-distance services from Indore Junction connect the city to major hubs across India, including Mumbai Central, New Delhi, Howrah, Ahmedabad, Jaipur, Kota, Lucknow, Amritsar, and Patna (see list of major trains below).

Local transport connections at the station include Indore Metro (Yellow Line) bus stop services, iBus, taxi and auto-rickshaw stands, and e-rickshaw services.

== Track layout ==
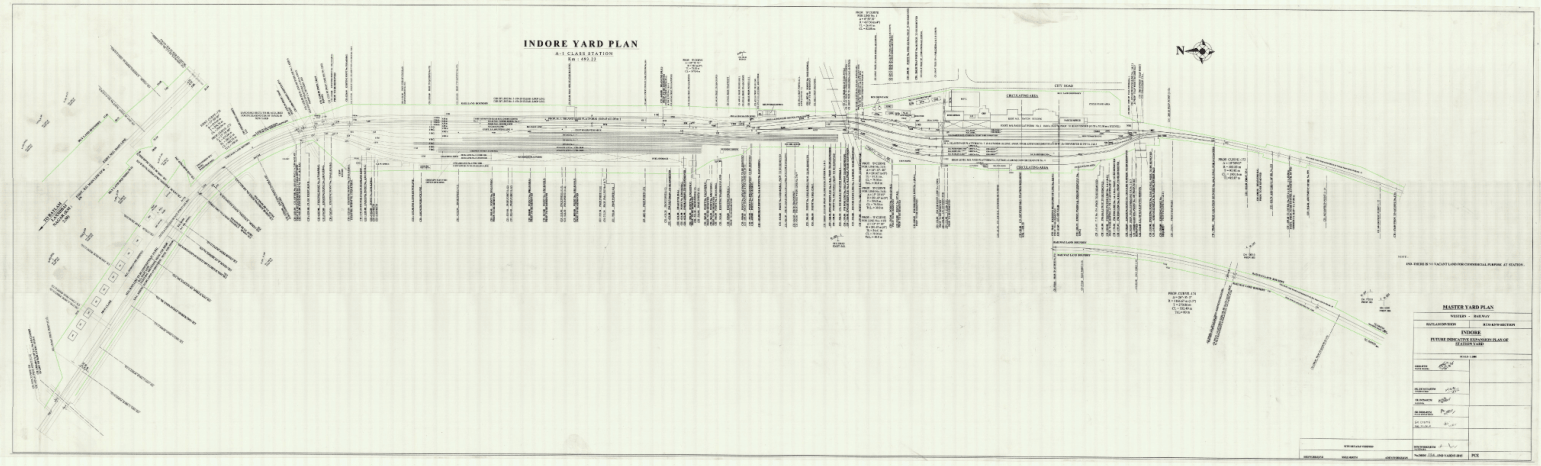

== Electrification ==
Western Railway started the electrification of Ujjain–Indore & Dewas–Maksi in the period of 2007–08 & completed in June 2012. A trial run of a special inspection saloon was also conducted on the newly laid system build at a cost of Rs 70 crore.

== Developments ==
=== Earlier upgrades (2010s) ===
The construction of two new platforms is done, which was approved earlier by the Western Railways (WR). The Indore railway station now has a modern station complex developed by the Western Railway's Ratlam railway division close to Rajkumar railway overbridge. This elevated structure would offer commuters space at the ground floor and have ticket booking counters, waiting halls, etc. on the first floor. The complex offer's sufficient parking facilities. The facility would be equipped with division's first underpass. A multi-storey parking facility is also under construction in the station premises. Now there are six platforms in Indore junction (BG). At present the conversion of Indore – Khandwa (meter-gauge) to (broad-gauge) rail line is in progress. A new line from Indore (Jn) to Dahod (Jn) is also work in progress. Recently CCEA also Sanctioned Gadarwara -Indore new rail line via Budni. This will decrease the distance between Indore and Jabalpur by 90 km. Also the Ministry of Shipping has approved Indore–Manmad Rail line. Then rail lines would increase the connectivity of Indore with Mumbai.

=== Station redevelopment (2025–2028) ===
In February 2026, Prime Minister Narendra Modi virtually laid the foundation stone for a major redevelopment of Indore Junction under the Amrit Bharat Station Scheme.

The redevelopment's first phase is budgeted at approximately ₹450 (US$4.70) and is being executed by the Ratlam railway division of Western Railway. The new station building will rise to seven storeys and span approximately 4.56 lakh square feet (42,400 m^{2}), roughly ten times the footprint of the existing 50,000 sq ft (4,600 m^{2}) structure. Planned features include:

- A concourse spanning all platforms, with 26 lifts and 17 escalators
- A "royal entrance," roof plaza, and executive lounge
- High-capacity drainage and station-wide Wi-Fi
- Rooftop solar power generation to offset a portion of the station's electricity demand
- Parking for over 500 vehicles

The upgraded station is designed for a projected passenger-handling capacity of 10,800 passengers per hour, and over 100,000 passengers daily, with a stated 50-year planning horizon. The number of platforms and running lines is not expected to increase as part of this project.

Construction is being carried out in 60 m (200 ft) sections to keep existing train operations running throughout the build. During construction, a number of services have been temporarily shifted to nearby Dr. Ambedkar Nagar (Mhow) and Laxmibai Nagar stations to reduce congestion at the main terminal. Railway officials have stated that passenger movement into the redeveloped building will begin as soon as the first two floors are completed, rather than waiting for the entire seven-storey structure.

Completion is targeted for 2027, ahead of the Simhastha Kumbh Mela due to be held at nearby Ujjain in 2028, which is expected to bring a substantial surge in rail traffic through Indore.

== Train services ==
Indore Junction is served by Vande Bharat, Duronto, superfast, Humsafar, and regular express and passenger trains connecting it to major cities across India. As of 2026, the station handles approximately 45 pairs of originating/terminating trains and around 30 halting trains daily.

=== Notable long-distance trains ===
Train	Destination	Type
Indore–Nagpur Vande Bharat Express	Nagpur	Vande Bharat
Indore–Mumbai Central Duronto Express	Mumbai Central	Duronto
Avantika Express	Mumbai Central	Superfast
Indore–New Delhi Intercity Express	New Delhi	Superfast
Malwa Express	Shri Vaishno Devi Katra	Superfast
Shipra Express	Howrah	Superfast
Ahilya Nagari Express	Thiruvananthapuram	Superfast
Indore–Jaipur Superfast Express	Jaipur	Superfast
Indore–Amritsar Express	Amritsar	Express
Indore–Patna Express	Patna	Express
Narmada Express	Bilaspur	Express
Indore–Bhopal Express	Bhopal	Express

=== Regional and suburban services ===
Frequent DEMU and passenger services link Indore Junction with nearby stations including Dr. Ambedkar Nagar (Mhow), Ratlam, and Ujjain, forming the core of the Indore Suburban Railway.

For live schedules and platform assignments, see the National Train Enquiry System or the station's entry on Indian Railways' official enquiry portals; exact timings are omitted here as they are subject to periodic revision.

== See also ==
- Ujjain Junction
- Bhopal Junction
- Rani Kamalapati
- Jabalpur Junction
- Indore-Dewas-Ujjain section
- Indore-Dahod line
