= Ujjain Junction railway station =

Railway station in Madhya Pradesh

Ujjain Junction
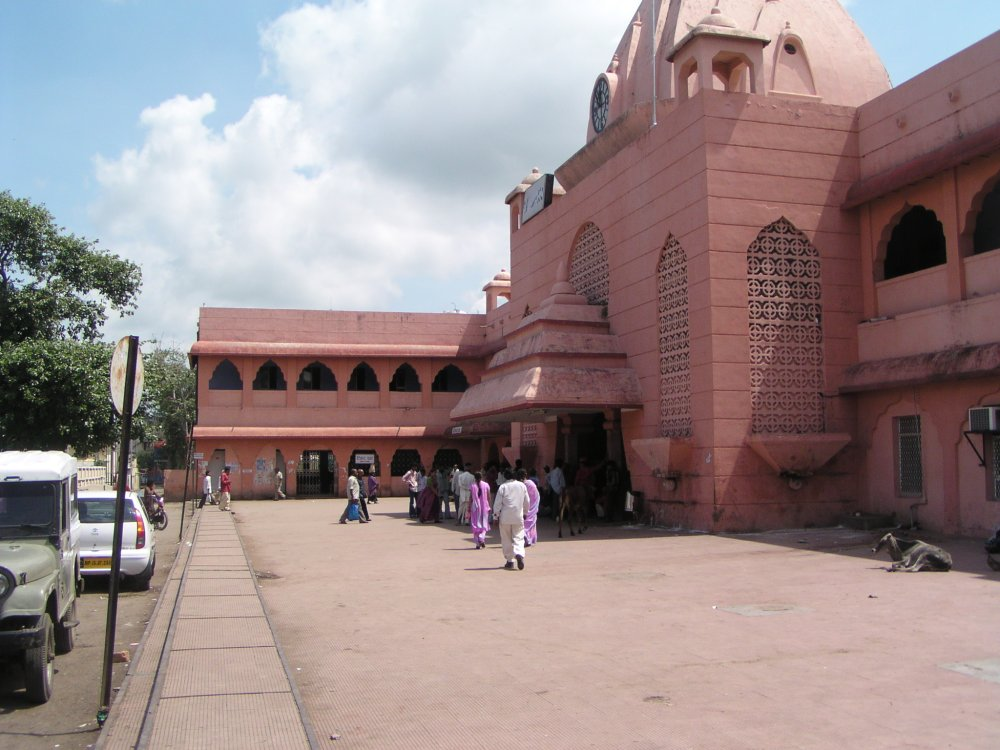
- Ujjain Junction railway station

General information
- Location: Station Road, Ujjain, Madhya Pradesh; India
- Coordinates: 23.1796°N 75.7819°E
- Elevation: 492 m (1,614 ft)
- System: Indian Railways station
- Owner: Indian Railways
- Operator: Western Railway
- Lines: Nagda–Ujjain section, Ujjain-Bhopal section, Indore-Dewas-Ujjain section
- Platforms: 8
- Tracks: 15
- Connections: Taxi stand, Auto stand

Construction
- Structure type: Standard (on-ground station)
- Parking: Available
- Cycle facilities: Available
- Accessible: Disabled access

Other information
- Status: Active
- Station code: UJN
- Zone(s): Western Railway
- Division(s): Ratlam

History
- Opened: 1876; 150 years ago
- Former names: Scindia–Neemuch Railway; Bombay, Baroda and Central India Railway

Passengers
- 75000 daily

Services
Preceding station	Indian Railways	Following station
Ujjain Junction towards ?	Western Railway zone Ujjain-Bhopal section	Pingleshwar towards ?
Vikramnagar towards ?	Western Railway zone Indore-Dewas-Ujjain section	Ujjain Junction towards ?
Chintaman Ganesh towards ?	Western Railway zone Fatehabad Chandrawatiganj-Ujjain section	Ujjain Junction towards ?
Naikheri towards ?	Western Railway zone Nagda-Ujjain section	Ujjain Junction towards ?
Route map
Location
- Location within Madhya Pradesh

Ujjain Junction railway station is the main railway station of Ujjain city in the western part of Madhya Pradesh. Its code is UJN. Ujjain Junction falls under the administrative control of Western Railway Zone of Indian Railways. Ujjain Junction is A – category railway station of Western Railway Zone. It consists of 8 railway platforms.

== History ==
The Indore–Ujjain branch line was opened in August 1876 and the line was completed in 1879–80. It was part of the Scindia Railway. Ratlam–Ujjain line was completed and opened for traffic in the year 1896.

The surveys of Indore–Neemuch line via Ujjain started long back in 1871–72 when the plan and estimates for the whole project was submitted to the Government of India in 1872–73.

Maharaja Jayajirao Scindia of Gwalior agreed to grant a loan of Rs. 7.5 million at 4 percent per annum interest for the project.

Scindia Neemuch Railway amalgamated under a single management in the year 1881–82 and was named as Rajputana Malwa railway.

In November 1951, Western Railway with its headquarters at Mumbai came into existence after merging of Rajputana Malwa railway with the other State Railways and overtook the administration of Ujjain. The broad-gauge portion was extended from Ujjain – Maksi–Indore in 1964–66 and the doubling of the Indore–Bhopal sections was completed during 1993–2001.

The doubling of the sections Nagda–Ujjain section was done in 1979–1981 followed by in Ujjain–Maksi section 1964–1965.

This junction is electrified in 1992 and Ratlam–Bhopal passenger was the first electric train. The Ujjain-Indore route and Indore Junction were electrified in 2011.

Gauge conversion of the Ujjain–Fatehabad line has an estimated cost of Rs 120 crore. It will reduce the distance between Ujjain and Indore by 20 km as well as reduce one and a half hours. The Railways closed this 134-year-old metre-gauge rail section in February 2014.

In September 2017, the station was the awarded the Best Tourist Friendly Railway Station by President Ramnath Kovind at a glittering ceremony at Vigyan Bhawan in New Delhi.

== Link route ==
The main station of Ujjain lies on the Ratlam–Bhopal, Indore–Nagda and Guna–Khandwa route. To the west it is connected to Ratlam Junction, to the north, it is connected with Nagda Junction, to the east it is connected with Maksi Junction, Bhopal Junction, and to the south, it is connected to Indore Junction BG, Dewas Junction.

== Suburban stations ==
The city of Ujjain has four other railway stations which are:

- Vikramnagar
- Matana Buzurg
- Pingleshwar
- Chintaman Ganesh

== See also ==
- Jabalpur Junction railway station
