= Mumbai CSMT–Rewa Weekly Superfast Express =

Train in India

Mumbai CSMT - Rewa Weekly Superfast Express

Overview
- Service type: Superfast
- Status: Active
- Locale: Maharashtra & Madhya Pradesh
- First service: 24 April 2026; 0 days' time
- Current operator: West Central Railway (WCR)

Route
- Termini: Mumbai CSM Terminus (CSMT); Rewa Terminal (REWA)
- Stops: 18
- Distance travelled: 1,213 km (754 mi)
- Average journey time: 20h 15m
- Service frequency: Weekly
- Train number: 20153 / 20154

On-board services
- Classes: General Unreserved, Sleeper Class, AC 3rd Class, AC 2nd Class, AC 1st Class
- Seating arrangements: Yes
- Sleeping arrangements: Yes
- Catering facilities: Pantry Car; On-board Catering; E-catering
- Observation facilities: Large windows
- Baggage facilities: No
- Other facilities: Below the seats

Technical
- Rolling stock: ICF coach
- Track gauge: 1,676 mm (5 ft 6 in)
- Operating speed: 61 km/h (38 mph) average including halts.

The 20153 / 20154 Mumbai CSMT–Rewa Weekly Superfast Express is an Superfast Express train belonging to West Central Railway zone that runs between Mumbai CSMT and Rewa Terminal in India.

== Schedule ==
• 20153 - 1:30 PM (Friday) [Mumbai CSMT]

• 20154 - 3:50 PM (Thursday) [Rewa Terminal]

== Routes and halts ==
The Important Halts of the train are :

● Mumbai CSMT

● Dadar Central

● Kalyan Junction

● Nasik Road

● Manmad Junction

● Jalgaon Junction

● Bhusaval Junction

● Khandwa Junction

● Harda

● Itarsi Junction

● Pipariya

● Gadarwara

● Narsinghpur

● Jabalpur Junction

● Katni Junction

● Maihar

● Satna Junction

● Rewa Terminal

== Traction ==
As the entire route is fully electrified it is hauled by a Kalyan Loco Shed-based WAP-7 electric locomotive from Mumbai CSMT to Rewa Terminal and vice versa.

== Rake reversal or rake share ==
No rake reversal or rake share.

== See also ==
Trains from Mumbai CSMT :

1. Latur–Mumbai CSMT Superfast Express
2. Mumbai CSMT–Howrah Duronto Express
3. Mumbai CSMT–Madgaon Vande Bharat Express
4. Deccan Express
5. Mumbai CSMT–Hazrat Nizamuddin Rajdhani Express

Trains from Rewa Terminal :

1. Rewa–Anand Vihar Superfast Express
2. Rewanchal Express
3. Rani Kamalapati–Rewa Vande Bharat Express
4. Rewa–Dr. Ambedkar Nagar Express
5. Rewa–Itwari Express

== Notes ==
a. Runs a day in a week with both directions.
