= Nagpur–Rewa Superfast Express =

Overview
- Service type: Superfast
- First service: 11 February 2015; 11 years ago
- Current operator: Central Railway zone

Route
- Termini: Nagpur Junction (NGP); Rewa Terminal (REWA)
- Stops: 16
- Distance travelled: 782 km (486 mi)
- Average journey time: 12h 30m
- Service frequency: Weekly (Note: Runs one day in a week for every direction.)
- Train number: 22135/22136

On-board services
- Classes: AC 2 tier, AC 3 tier, Sleeper class, General Unreserved
- Seating arrangements: No
- Sleeping arrangements: Yes
- Catering facilities: On-board catering E-catering
- Observation facilities: LHB coach
- Entertainment facilities: No
- Baggage facilities: No
- Other facilities: Below the seats

Technical
- Rolling stock: 2
- Track gauge: 1,676 mm (5 ft 6 in)
- Operating speed: 63 km/h (39 mph), including halts

The Nagpur–Rewa Superfast Express is a Superfast train belonging to Central Railway zone that runs between Nagpur Junction and Rewa Terminal in India. It is currently being operated with 22135/22136 train numbers on a weekly basis. This train has been discontinued and Rewa NSC Bose and NSC Bose rewa runs with a different route via Balaghat and chhindwara alternate basis. Train number 11754/11756

== Service ==
The 22135/Nagpur–Rewa SF Express has an average speed of 63 km/h and covers 782 km in 12h 30m. The 22136/Rewa–Nagpur SF Express has an average speed of 56 km/h and covers 782 km in 14h 5m.

== Route and halts ==
The important halts of the train are:

- Nagpur Junction
- Narkher Junction
- Pandhurna
- Amla Junction
- Betul
- Itarsi Junction
- Narsinghpur
- Jabalpur Junction
- Katni Junction
- Maihar
- Satna Junction
- Rewa Terminal

== Coach composition ==
The train has standard LHB rakes with max speed of 110 kmph. The train consists of 16 coaches:

- 1 AC II Tier and AC III Tier
- 1 AC III Tier
- 6 Sleeper coaches
- 6 General Unreserved
- 2 Seating cum Luggage Rake

== Traction ==
Both trains are hauled by a Kalyan Loco Shed-based WDM-3A diesel locomotive from Nagpur to Rewa and vice versa.

== Rake sharing ==
The train shares its rake with 11201/11202 Lokmanya Tilak Terminus–Ajni Express and 11205/11206 Lokmanya Tilak Terminus–Nizamabad Express.

== See also ==
- Rewa Terminal railway station
- Nagpur Junction railway station
- Lokmanya Tilak Terminus–Ajni Express
- Lokmanya Tilak Terminus–Nizamabad Express
