= Rani Kamalapati–Rewa Vande Bharat Express =

Mini Vande Bharat Express train route in India

Rani Kamalapati - Rewa Terminal Vande Bharat Express

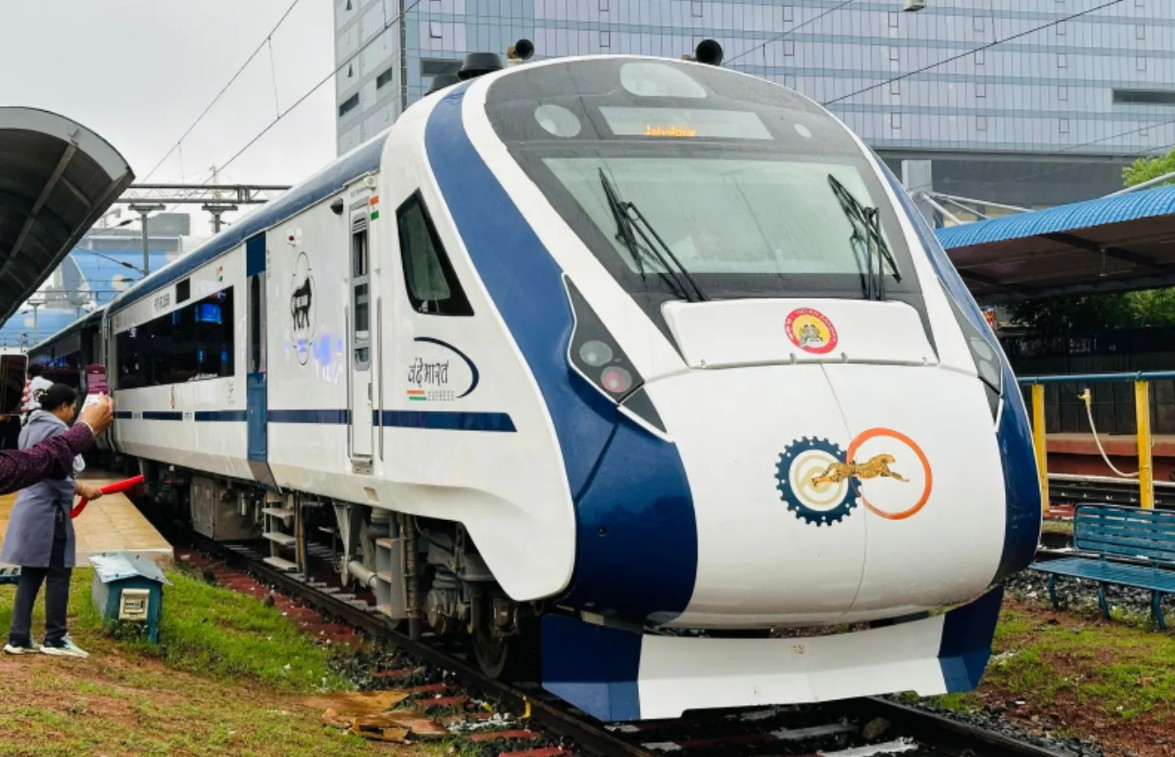
- This Mini VB Express train on standby at Rani Kamalapati

Overview
- Service type: Vande Bharat Express
- Locale: Madhya Pradesh
- First service: 27 June 2023 (Inaugural run); 28 June 2023; 3 years ago (Commercial run)
- Current operator: West Central Railways (WCR)

Route
- Termini: Rani Kamalapati (RKMP); Rewa Terminal (REWA)
- Stops: 8
- Distance travelled: 569 km (354 mi)
- Average journey time: 08 hrs
- Service frequency: Six days a week (Note: Except Tuesdays)
- Train number: 20173 / 20174
- Lines used: Bhopal–Itarsi line; Itarsi–Jabalpur line; Jabalpur–Rewa line

On-board services
- Classes: AC Chair Car, AC Executive Chair Car
- Seating arrangements: Airline style; Rotatable seats
- Sleeping arrangements: No
- Catering facilities: On-board catering
- Observation facilities: Large windows in all coaches
- Entertainment facilities: On-board WiFi; Infotainment System; Electric outlets; Reading light; Seat Pockets; Bottle Holder; Tray Table
- Baggage facilities: Overhead racks
- Other facilities: Kavach

Technical
- Rolling stock: Mini Vande Bharat 2.0
- Track gauge: Indian gauge 1,676 mm (5 ft 6 in) broad gauge
- Electrification: 25 kV 50 Hz AC Overhead line
- Operating speed: 72 km/h (45 mph) (Avg.)
- Average length: 192 metres (630 ft) (08 coaches)
- Track owner: Indian Railways
- Rake maintenance: Rewa (REWA)

The 20173/20174 Rani Kamalapati - Rewa Vande Bharat Express is India's 22nd Vande Bharat Express train, connecting the city of Bhopal with Rewa city in Madhya Pradesh. This train was flagged off by Prime Minister Narendra Modi on 27 June 2023. On 8 October 2023, it was announced that starting on 10 October, the train would be extended till Rewa. Earlier the train used to run from Bhopal to Jabalpur.

== Overview ==
This train is operated by Indian Railways, connecting Rani Kamalapati, Narmadapuram, Itarsi Jn, Pipariya, Narsinghpur, Jabalpur Jn, Katni Jn, Maihar, Satna Jn and Rewa. It will be operated with train numbers 20173/20174 on 6 days a week basis.

== Rakes ==
It is the twentieth 2nd Generation and the eighth Mini Vande Bharat 2.0 Express train which was designed and manufactured by the Integral Coach Factory at Perambur, Chennai under the Make in India Initiative.

== Service ==
The 20173/20174 Rani Kamalapati - Rewa Vande Bharat Express operates six days a week except Tuesdays, covering a distance of 568 km (353 mi) in a travel time of 8 hours with an average speed of 70 km/h (43 mph). The service has 8 intermediate stops. The Maximum Permissible Speed is 130 km/h (81 mph).

== See also ==
- Vande Bharat Express
- Gatimaan Express
- Tejas Express
- Narmadapuram railway station
- Jabalpur Junction railway station
