= Madan Mahal–Rewa Intercity Express =

Train in India

Jabalpur-Rewa Intercity Express
Overview
- Service type: Express
- Locale: Madhya Pradesh
- Current operator(s): West Central Railway

Route
- Termini: Jabalpur Junction (JBP); Rewa (REWA)
- Stops: 10
- Distance travelled: 238 km (148 mi)
- Average journey time: 4 hrs 10 mins
- Service frequency: Daily
- Train number(s): 22189 / 22190

On-board services
- Class(es): AC Chair Car, Chair Car, General Unreserved, AC Three tier, Sleeper
- Seating arrangements: Yes
- Sleeping arrangements: No
- Auto-rack arrangements: Overhead racks
- Catering facilities: E-catering only
- Observation facilities: Large windows
- Baggage facilities: Available
- Other facilities: Below the seats

Technical
- Rolling stock: LHB coach
- Track gauge: Broad Gauge
- Operating speed: 55 km/h (34 mph) average including halts.

The 22189 / 22190 Jabalpur-Rewa Intercity Express is a daily superfast express train of the Indian Railways, which runs between Jabalpur, one of the important city & military cantonment hubs of Central Indian state Madhya Pradesh and Rewa, Madhya Pradesh.

== Number and nomenclature ==
The number allowted for the train is :

- 22189 - From Rewa to Jabalpur
- 22190 - From Jabalpur to Rewa

The name "Intercity Express" refers to the chair car class service of the Intercity Express (Indian Railways) trains, hence the name.

Till November 2019, it was run as Jabalpur Rewa Intercity Express with numbered (11451/11452) later it was extended to Madan Mahal and renamed as Madan Mahal Rewa Intercity Express.

== Routes and halts ==
The train goes via Katni Junction. The important halts of the train are:

- Jabalpur Junction
- Sihora Road
- Katni Junction
- Maihar
- Satna Junction
- Rewa

== Locomotive ==
The train is hauled by an Itarsi Loco Shed based WAP-7 electric locomotive from end to end.

== Coach composite ==
The train consists of 22 LHB coaches as follows:

- 1 AC Chair Car
- 7 Second Class Seating
- 10 General Unreserved
- 1 AC 3 Tier
- 1 Sleeper
- 1 Eog (End on Generator)
- 1 SLR (Seating cum Luggage Rake)
