= Rewa–Itwari Special =

Indian Railways express train

Rewa-Itwari Special
Overview
- Service type: Express
- Locale: Madhya Pradesh & Maharashtra
- Current operator: West Central Railway

Route
- Termini: Rewa Terminal (REWA); Itwari Junction (ITR)
- Stops: 7
- Distance travelled: 601 km (373 mi)
- Average journey time: 14 hrs 05 mins
- Service frequency: Tri-weekly (Note: Runs thrice in a week for every direction.)
- Train number: 11754 / 11753

On-board services
- Classes: AC 1 tier, AC 2 tier, AC 3 tier, Sleeper class, General Unreserved
- Seating arrangements: Yes
- Sleeping arrangements: Yes
- Catering facilities: Not Available
- Baggage facilities: Below the seats

Technical
- Rolling stock: ICF coach
- Track gauge: 1,676 mm (5 ft 6 in)
- Operating speed: 42 km/h (26 mph) average including halts

The 11754 / 11753 Rewa - Itwari - Rewa Express is an Express train of the Indian Railways connecting Rewa Terminal in Madhya Pradesh and Itwari Junction of Maharashtra. It is currently being operated on a tri-weekly basis.

== Route and halts ==
The important halts of the train are:

- Rewa Terminal
- Satna Junction
- Maihar
- Katni Junction
- Jabalpur Junction
- Nainpur Junction
- Balaghat Junction
- Gondia Junction
- Itwari Junction

== Coach composition ==
The train has refurbished ICF rake. The train consists of 20 coaches:

- 1 AC I Tier
- 1 AC II Tier
- 3 AC III Tier
- 13 Sleeper coaches
- 4 General coaches
