= Rajkot–Rewa Superfast Express =

Train in India

Overview
- Service type: Superfast
- First service: 5 January 2015; 11 years ago
- Current operator: Western Railway zone

Route
- Termini: Rajkot Junction (RJT); Rewa Terminal (REWA)
- Stops: 22
- Distance travelled: 1,601 km (995 mi)
- Average journey time: 26 hrs 30 mins
- Service frequency: Weekly (Note: Runs one day in a week for every direction.)
- Train number: 22937/22938

On-board services
- Classes: AC 2 tier, AC 3 tier, Sleeper class, General Unreserved
- Seating arrangements: Yes
- Sleeping arrangements: Yes
- Catering facilities: On-board catering E-catering
- Observation facilities: LHB coach
- Entertainment facilities: No
- Baggage facilities: No
- Other facilities: Below the seats

Technical
- Rolling stock: 2
- Track gauge: 1,676 mm (5 ft 6 in)
- Operating speed: 56 km/h (35 mph), including halts

The 22937/22938 Rajkot–Rewa Superfast Express is a Superfast train belonging to Western Railway zone that runs between Rajkot Junction and Rewa Terminal in India. It is currently being operated with 22937/22938 train numbers on a weekly basis.

== Coach composition ==
The train has standard ICF rakes with a maximum speed of 110 km/h. The train consists of 23 coaches:

- 1 AC II Tier
- 5 AC III Tier
- 11 Sleeper coaches
- 4 General Unreserved
- 2 Seating cum Luggage Rake

== Service ==
The 22937/Rajkot–Rewa Superfast Express has an average speed of 58 km/h and covers 1601 km in 27 hrs 30 mins.

The 22938/Rewa–Rajkot Superfast Express has an average speed of 62 km/h and covers 1601 km in 25 hrs 45 mins.

== Route and halts ==
The important halts of the train are:

- Rajkot Junction
- Surendranagar Junction
- Ahmedabad Junction
- Nadiad Junction
- Anand Junction
- Vadodara Junction
- Bharuch Junction
- Surat
- Nandurbar
- Jalgaon Junction
- Bhusaval Junction
- Khandwa Junction
- Itarsi Junction
- Jabalpur Junction
- Katni Junction
- Maihar
- Satna Junction
- Rewa Terminal

== Schedule ==
Train number	Station code	Departure station	Departure time	Departure day	Arrival station	Arrival time	Arrival day
22937	RJT	Rajkot Junction	13:45 PM	Sun	Rewa	17:15 PM	Mon
22938	REWA	Rewa	20:55 PM	Mon	Rajkot Junction	22:40 PM	Tue

== Traction ==
Both trains are hauled by a Vatva Loco Shed-based WDM-3A diesel locomotive from Rajkot to Ahmedabad. From Ahmedabad, trains are hauled by a Vadodara Loco Shed-based WAP-4E electric locomotive uptil Itarsi. From Itarsi trains are hauled by an Itarsi Loco Shed-based WDM-3A diesel locomotive uptil Rewa and vice versa.

== Rake sharing ==
The train shares its rake with 20913/20914 Rajkot–Delhi Sarai Rohilla Weekly Superfast Express.

== See also ==
- Rewa Terminal railway station
- Rajkot Junction railway station
- Rajkot–Delhi Sarai Rohilla Weekly Superfast Express
