= Howbagh Jabalpur railway station =

Railway station in Madhya Pradesh, India

General information
- Location: Gorakhpur, Jabalpur, Madhya Pradesh; India
- Coordinates: 23.1558°N 79.9317°E
- Elevation: 404 metres (1,325 ft)
- System: Indian Railways station
- Owner: Indian Railways
- Operator: South East Central Railway
- Line: Jabalpur–Bhusaval section
- Platforms: 2
- Tracks: 2
- Connections: Auto stand

Construction
- Structure type: Standard (on-ground station)
- Parking: No
- Cycle facilities: No

Other information
- Status: Active
- Station code: HBG
- Zone(s): South East Central Railway
- Division(s): Nagpur SEC

History
- Closed: Yes

Services
| Preceding station | Indian Railways | Following station |
|---|---|---|
| Jabalpur Junction towards ? | West Central Railway zone Jabalpur–Bhusaval section | Madan Mahal towards ? |
Location

Howbagh Jabalpur railway station is a small railway station in Jabalpur district, Madhya Pradesh. Its code is HBG. It serves Jabalpur city. The station consists of two platforms, neither well sheltered. It lacks many facilities including water and sanitation.
