= Amla–Chhindwara Passenger =

Passenger train in India

Overview
- Service type: Passenger
- Current operator(s): Central Railway

Route
- Termini: Amla Junction (AMLA); Chhindwara Junction (CWA)
- Stops: 14
- Distance travelled: 115 km (71 mi)
- Average journey time: 4h
- Service frequency: Daily (Note: Runs seven days in a week for every direction.)
- Train number(s): 51253/51254

On-board services
- Class(es): Unreserved
- Seating arrangements: Yes
- Sleeping arrangements: No
- Catering facilities: No
- Observation facilities: ICF coach
- Entertainment facilities: No
- Baggage facilities: Below the seats

Technical
- Rolling stock: 2
- Track gauge: 5 ft 6 in (1,676 mm)
- Electrification: No
- Operating speed: 29 km/h (18 mph) average with halts

The Amla–Chhindwara Passenger is a passenger train belonging to Central Railway zone that runs between Amla Junction and Chhindwara Junction. It is currently being operated with 51253/51254 train numbers on a daily basis.

== Average speed and frequency ==
- The 51253/Amla–Chhindwara Passenger runs with an average speed of 29 km/h and completes 115 km in 4h.
- The 51254/Chhindwara–Amla Passenger runs with an average speed of 36 km/h and completes 115 km in 3h 10m.

== Route and halts ==
The important halts of the train are:

- Amla Junction
- Chhindwara Junction

== Coach composite ==
The train has standard ICF rakes with max speed of 110 kmph. The train consists of 9 coaches:

- 7 General Unreserved
- 2 Seating cum Luggage Rake

== Traction ==
Both trains are hauled by an Itarsi Loco Shed-based WDM-3A or WDP-4 diesel locomotive from Amla to Chhindwara and vice versa.

== Rake sharing ==
The train shares its rake with 51239/51240 Amla–Betul Passenger and 51293/51294 Nagpur–Amla Passenger.

== See also ==
- Amla Junction railway station
- Chhindwara Junction railway station
- Amla–Betul Passenger
- Nagpur–Amla Passenger
