= Rewa–Anand Vihar Superfast Express =

Train in India

Rewa-Anand Vihar Terminal Superfast Express
Overview
- Service type: Superfast
- Locale: Madhya Pradesh, Uttar Pradesh, Delhi
- First service: 27 September 2003; 22 years ago
- Current operator: Northern Railway

Route
- Termini: Rewa (REWA); Anand Vihar Terminal (ANVT)
- Stops: 11
- Distance travelled: 849 km (528 mi)
- Average journey time: 14:10
- Service frequency: daily
- Train number: 12427 / 12428

On-board services
- Classes: AC first, AC 2 Tier, AC 3, Sleeper class, General Unreserved
- Seating arrangements: yes
- Sleeping arrangements: yes
- Catering facilities: on-board catering, E-catering
- Observation facilities: large windows
- Baggage facilities: available
- Other facilities: below the seats

Technical
- Rolling stock: LHB coach
- Track gauge: 5 ft 6 in (1,676 mm) Indian gauge
- Operating speed: 60 km/h (37 mph) average with halts

The 12427/12428 Rewa–Anand Vihar Terminal Superfast Express is a daily Superfast Express train of the Indian Railways, running between Rewa, a city of Madhya Pradesh and Anand Vihar Terminal of Delhi with LHB coaches which are safer than regular ICF coaches. The train originally ran from New Delhi Railway Station before being shifted to Anand Vihar station on 2 September 2021. The train is operated by Indian Railways' Northern Railway zone on the section which is part of the busy Howrah–Delhi main line (Grand Trunk section). It is, along with the prestigious Shaan-e-Bhopal Express, one of the first ISO 9002-certified trains in India because of its security features and high priority on the Indian Railways. However, it takes two hours more than the Rajdhani Express to cover the same distance. It is also slower than some other Superfast trains in this section, but has one of highest commercial speeds amongst non-Rajdhani trains.

== Schedule ==
12427 (up): daily from Rewa at 16:30 IST and arrives at Anand Vihar Terminal (Delhi) the next day at 06:35.

12428 (down): daily at 22:05 IST from Anand Vihar Terminal (Delhi) and reaches Rewa the next day at 11:10.

== Coach composition ==
- 1 AC I Tier
- 2 AC II Tier
- 6 AC III Tier
- 7 Sleeper Coaches
- 4 General
- 1 LSLRD (LHB Second Luggage, Guard & Divyaang Compartment)
- 1 EOG Luggage/parcel van

Loco	1	2	3	4	5	6	7	8	9	10	11	12	13	14	15	16	17	18	19	20	21	22
	DL1	GEN	GEN	S1	S2	S3	S4	S5	S6	S7	B1	B2	B3	B4	B5	B6	A2	A1	H1	GEN	GEN	EOG

== Stops ==
- Rewa
- Satna
- Manikpur
- Dabhaura
- Shankargarh
- Allahabad
- Sirathu
- Fatehpur
- Kanpur Central
- Aligarh
- Ghaziabad
- Anand Vihar Terminal

== Motive power ==
The normally-assigned locomotive for the Rewa Superfast Express is a HoG WAP-7 locomotive from either the Tughlakabad or Ghaziabad shed. The train reverses at Satna Junction and a WAP-4 or WAP-7 locomotive from Itarsi shed hauls it to the Rewa terminal.

Since the route is fully electrified a Ghaziabad (GZB) HOG WAP 7 locomotive hauls the train from Anand Vihar Terminal to Satna Junction where a WAP-4 electric locomotive reverses and hauls the train for the remaining journey to Rewa Terminal and vice versa.

Loco change: Satna Junction

== See also ==
- Rewanchal Express
