= Bilaspur–Rewa Express =

Train in India

Overview
- Service type: Express
- First service: 11 July 2017; 8 years ago
- Current operator: South East Central Railway zone

Route
- Termini: Bilaspur Junction (BSP); Rewa Terminal (REWA)
- Stops: 37
- Distance travelled: 467 km (290 mi)
- Average journey time: 11h 15m
- Service frequency: Daily (Note: Runs seven days in a week for every direction.)
- Train number: 18247/18248

On-board services
- Classes: AC 3 tier, Sleeper class, General Unreserved
- Seating arrangements: No
- Sleeping arrangements: Yes
- Catering facilities: E-catering
- Observation facilities: ICF coach
- Entertainment facilities: No
- Baggage facilities: No
- Other facilities: Below the seats

Technical
- Rolling stock: 2
- Track gauge: 1,676 mm (5 ft 6 in)
- Electrification: Up to Katni with electric loco link WAP-7 of BHILAI LOCO SHED
- Operating speed: 41 km/h (25 mph), including halts

The Bilaspur–Rewa Express is an Express train belonging to South East Central Railway zone that runs between Bilaspur Junction and Rewa Terminal in India. It is currently being operated with 18247/18248 train numbers on a daily basis. The updated link form wag-5 is wap-7 bhilai shed.

== Service ==
The 18247/Bilaspur–Rewa Express has an average speed of 41 km/h and covers 467 km in 11h 15m. The 18248/Rewa–Bilaspur Express has an average speed of 40 km/h and covers 467 km in 11h 40m.

== Route and halts ==
The important halts of the train are:

- Bilaspur Junction
- Uslapur
- Pendra Road
- Anuppur Junction
- Umaria
- Katni Junction
- Maihar
- Satna Junction
- Rewa Terminal

== Coach composition ==
The train has standard ICF rakes with max speed of 110 kmph. The train consists of 14 coaches :

- 4 Sleeper coaches
- 1 AC 3 Tier Coach (recently added)
- 7 General Unreserved
- 2 Seating cum Luggage Rake

== Traction ==
Both trains were hauled by a Bhilai Electric Loco Shed-based WAG-5 or WAM-4 electric locomotive from Bilaspur to Katni before! Now the new link up to Katni for the train is WAP-7 of Bhilai Electric Loco Shed. From Katni, trains are hauled by a Katni Diesel Loco Shed-based WDM-3A or WDG-3A locomotive up til Rewa.

== See also ==
- Bilaspur Junction railway station
- Rewa Terminal railway station
