= Dadadham Intercity Express =

Train in India

Overview
- Service type: Express
- First service: 18 January 2011; 15 years ago
- Current operator: Central Railway zone

Route
- Termini: Bhusaval Junction; Nagpur Junction
- Stops: 18
- Distance travelled: 605 km (376 mi)
- Average journey time: 10 hours 50 mins
- Service frequency: Tri-weekly
- Train number: 22111 / 22112

On-board services
- Classes: general unreserved, AC Chair car, Chair car
- Seating arrangements: Yes
- Sleeping arrangements: Yes
- Catering facilities: No

Technical
- Rolling stock: Standard Indian Railways Coaches
- Track gauge: 1,676 mm (5 ft 6 in)
- Operating speed: 57.5 km/h (36 mph)

The 22111 / 12 Dadadham Intercity Express is an Express train belonging to Indian Railways Central Railway zone that runs between Bhusaval Junction and Nagpur Junction in India.

It operates as train number 22111 from Bhusaval Junction to Nagpur Junction and as train number 22112 in the reverse direction serving the states of Maharashtra and Madhya Pradesh.

== Coaches ==
The 22111 / 12 Dadadham Intercity Express has one AC Chair car, two chair cars, six general unreserved, and two SLR (seating with luggage rake) coaches. It does not carry a pantry car coach. As is customary with most train services in India, coach composition may be amended at the discretion of Indian Railways depending on demand.

== Service ==
The 22869 Bhusaval Junction - Nagpur Junction Dadadham Intercity Express covers the distance of 605 km (376 mi) in 10 hours 35 mins (57 km/h) and in 10 hours 25 mins as the 22112 Nagpur Junction - Bhusaval Junction Intercity Express (58 km/h).

As the average speed of the train is lower than 55 km/h (34 mph), as per railway rules, its fare doesn't includes a Superfast surcharge.

== Routing ==
The 22111 / 12 Dadadham Intercity Express runs from Bhusaval Junction via Khandwa Junction, Itarsi Junction, Amla Junction to Nagpur Junction.

== Traction ==
As the route is electrified, a Bhusaval Junction based WAP-4 electric locomotive pulls the train to its destination.
