= Nagpur–Amla Passenger =

Train in India

Overview
- Service type: Passenger
- Current operator(s): Central Railway

Route
- Termini: Nagpur Junction (NGP); Amla Junction (AMLA)
- Stops: 18
- Distance travelled: 168 km (104 mi)
- Average journey time: 4h 25m
- Service frequency: Daily (Note: Runs seven days in a week for every direction.)
- Train number(s): 51293/51294

On-board services
- Class(es): Unreserved
- Seating arrangements: Yes
- Sleeping arrangements: No
- Catering facilities: No
- Observation facilities: ICF coach
- Entertainment facilities: No
- Baggage facilities: Below the seats

Technical
- Rolling stock: 2
- Track gauge: 5 ft 6 in (1,676 mm)
- Electrification: No
- Operating speed: 38 km/h (24 mph) average with halts

The Nagpur–Amla Passenger is a Passenger train belonging to Central Railway zone that runs between Amla Junction and Nagpur Junction. It is currently being operated with 51293/51294 train numbers on a daily basis.

== Average speed and frequency ==
- The 51293/Nagpur–Amla Passenger runs with an average speed of 38 km/h and completes 168 km in 4h 25m.
- The 51294/Amla–Nagpur Passenger runs with an average speed of 35 km/h and completes 168 km in 4h 45m.

== Route and halts ==
The important halts of the train are:

- Nagpur Junction
- Narkher Junction
- Pandhurna
- Amla Junction

== Coach composite ==
The train has standard ICF rakes with max speed of 110 kmph. The train consists of 9 coaches:

- 7 General Unreserved
- 2 Seating cum Luggage Rake

== Traction ==
Both trains are hauled by an Ajni Loco Shed-based WAP-7 or Kalyan Loco Shed-based WCAM-3 electric locomotive from Amla to Nagpur and vice versa.

== Rake sharing ==
The train shares its rake with 51239/51240 Amla–Betul Passenger and 51253/51254 Amla–Chhindwara Passenger.

== See also ==
- Amla Junction railway station
- Nagpur Junction railway station
- Amla–Betul Passenger
- Amla–Chhindwara Passenger
