= Jaipur–Secunderabad Express =

Train in India

Overview
- Service type: Express
- First service: 3 March 2011 (as Special Train); 25 May 2013 (conversion into Express train)
- Current operator: North Western Railways

Route
- Termini: Jaipur Junction; Secunderabad Junction
- Stops: 30
- Distance travelled: 1,735 km (1,078 mi)
- Average journey time: 33 hours 20 mins
- Service frequency: Weekly
- Train number: 19713 / 19714

On-board services
- Classes: AC 1 Tier, AC 2 Tier, AC 3 Tier, Sleeper, General
- Sleeping arrangements: Yes
- Catering facilities: Pantry car attached

Technical
- Rolling stock: LHB coach
- Track gauge: 1,676 mm (5 ft 6 in)
- Operating speed: 140 km/h (87 mph) maximum, 52 km/h (32 mph), including halts

Jaipur–Secunderabad Express is an Express train belonging to North Western Railway zone of Indian Railways that runs between Jaipur Junction and Secunderabad Junction in India.

== Background ==
This train was Inaugurated on 3 March 2011, as a seasonal line running Secunderabad–Jaipur special train (No. 09735/36). which was maintained under the South Central Railways. Later, it became quite popular for direct connectivity to Rajasthan from South India.

On 25 May 2013, this Special train was converted into Express train with new numbered 19713 / 14 and became the fourth weekly train running between the Jaipur and Hyderabad corridor and also the rake maintenance was also transferred to North Western Railways.

== Service ==
The frequency of this train is weekly, it covers the distance of 1735 km with an average speed of 52 km/h.

== Routes ==
This train passes through Sawai Madhopur Junction, Kota Junction, Nagda Junction, Bhopal Junction, Itarsi Junction, Amla Junction, Badnera Junction, Akola Junction, Purna Junction, Hazur Sahib Nanded and Nizamabad Junction on both sides.

== Traction ==
As this route is fully electric, a Lallaguda based WAP-7 pulls the train from sc to jp and vice versa
