= Sivani =

Village in Madhya Pradesh, India

Coordinates: 22°22′N 79°26′E

Sivani (also known as Sivani Panchayath) is a village in Chhapara Tehsil in Seoni District of Madhya Pradesh State, India. It belongs to Jabalpur Division. It is located 40 km to the north of District headquarters Seoni, 278 km from the State capital Bhopal.

Sivani is surrounded by Lakhnadon Tehsil towards the North, Dhanaura Tehsil towards the East, Seoni Tehsil towards the South, and Keolari Tehsil towards the East.

Cities near Sivani include Seoni, Nainpur, Chhindwara, and Wara Seoni..

== Demographics of Sivani ==
The local language of Sivani is Hindi.

== Transport links ==
=== Rail ===
There is no railway station closer than 1000 km to Sivani. However, Jabalpur Railway Station is a major railway station 187 km away.

== Pincodes near Sivani ==
480884 (Chhapara), 480886 (Lakhnadon), 480887 (Adegaon)

== Jungle Book ==
The story of Jungle Book happens in Seoni jungle.

== Colleges near Sivani ==
- Govt. Art And Commerce College, Keolari

Address : Keolari-ugli Road, keolari

- Gwlior Institute Of Technology And Science

Address : Kedarpur; Shivpuri Link Rd; Lashkar; Gwalior

== Schools near Sivani ==
- Up Gms Kondra

Address : kondra, chhapara, seoni, Madhya Pradesh. PIN- 480884, Post - Chhapara

- Up Gms Danimeta

Address : danimeta, chhapara, seoni, Madhya Pradesh. PIN- 480884, Post - Chhapara

- Up Gms Kareli

Address : kareli, chhapara, seoni, Madhya Pradesh. PIN- 480885

- Up Gms Bakshi

Address : bakshi, chhapara, seoni, Madhya Pradesh. PIN- 480887, Post - Adegaon
