= Rewanchal Express =

Train in India

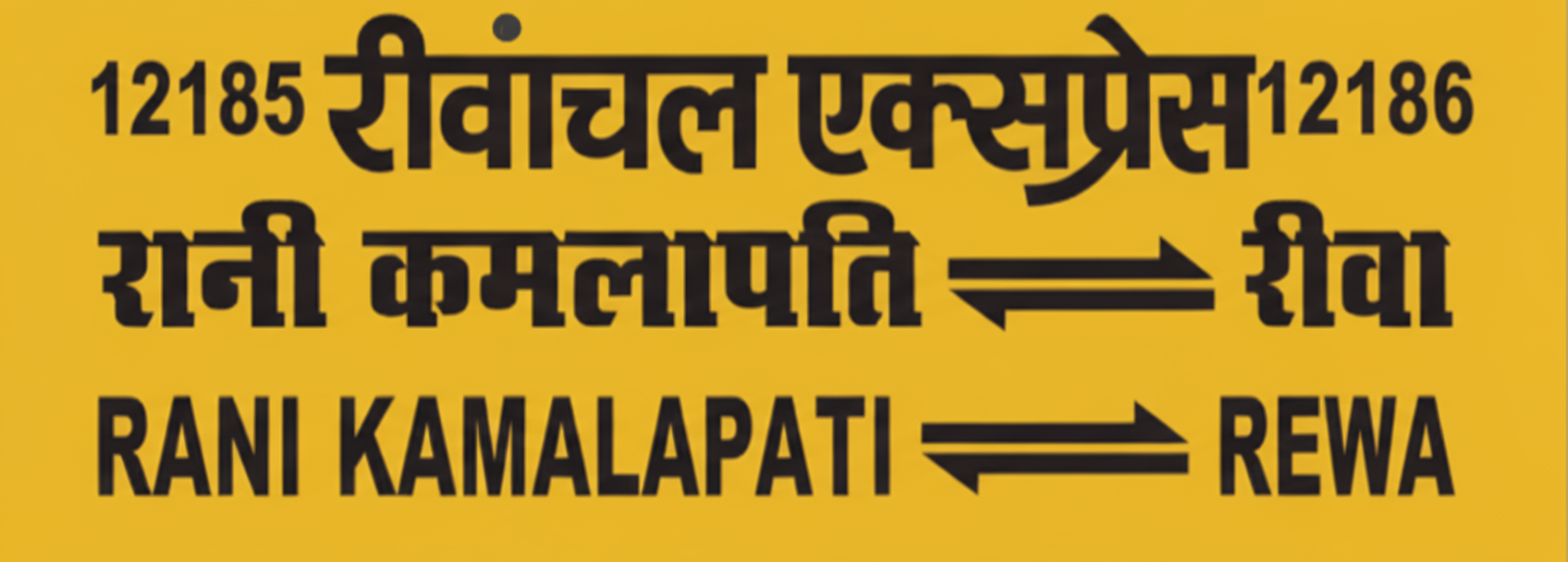
- Train board of Rewanchal Express.

Overview
- Service type: Express
- Locale: Madhya Pradesh
- First service: 1 January 1998; 28 years ago
- Current operator: West Central Railway

Route
- Termini: Rewa (REWA); Rani Kamalapati (RKMP)
- Stops: 13
- Distance travelled: 555 km (345 mi)
- Average journey time: 10 hours approx.
- Service frequency: Daily (Note: Runs seven days in a week for every direction.)
- Train number: 12185 / 12186

On-board services
- Classes: AC first, AC 2 tier, AC 3 tier, AC 3 tier economy, Sleeper class, General Unreserved
- Seating arrangements: Yes
- Sleeping arrangements: Yes
- Catering facilities: E-Catering only
- Observation facilities: Large windows
- Baggage facilities: Below the seats

Technical
- Rolling stock: LHB coach
- Track gauge: 1,676 mm (5 ft 6 in)
- Operating speed: 55 km/h (34 mph) average including halts.
Route map
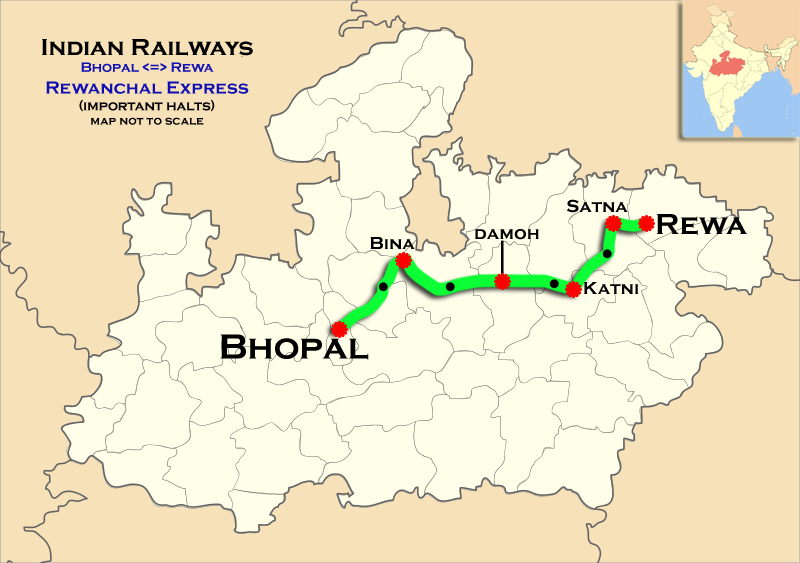

The 12185 / 12186 Rewanchal Express is a daily express train operated by West Central Railway's Bhopal division in India. The train's route runs between Rani Kamalapati railway station of Bhopal in Madhya Pradesh and Rewa.

== Arrival and departure info ==
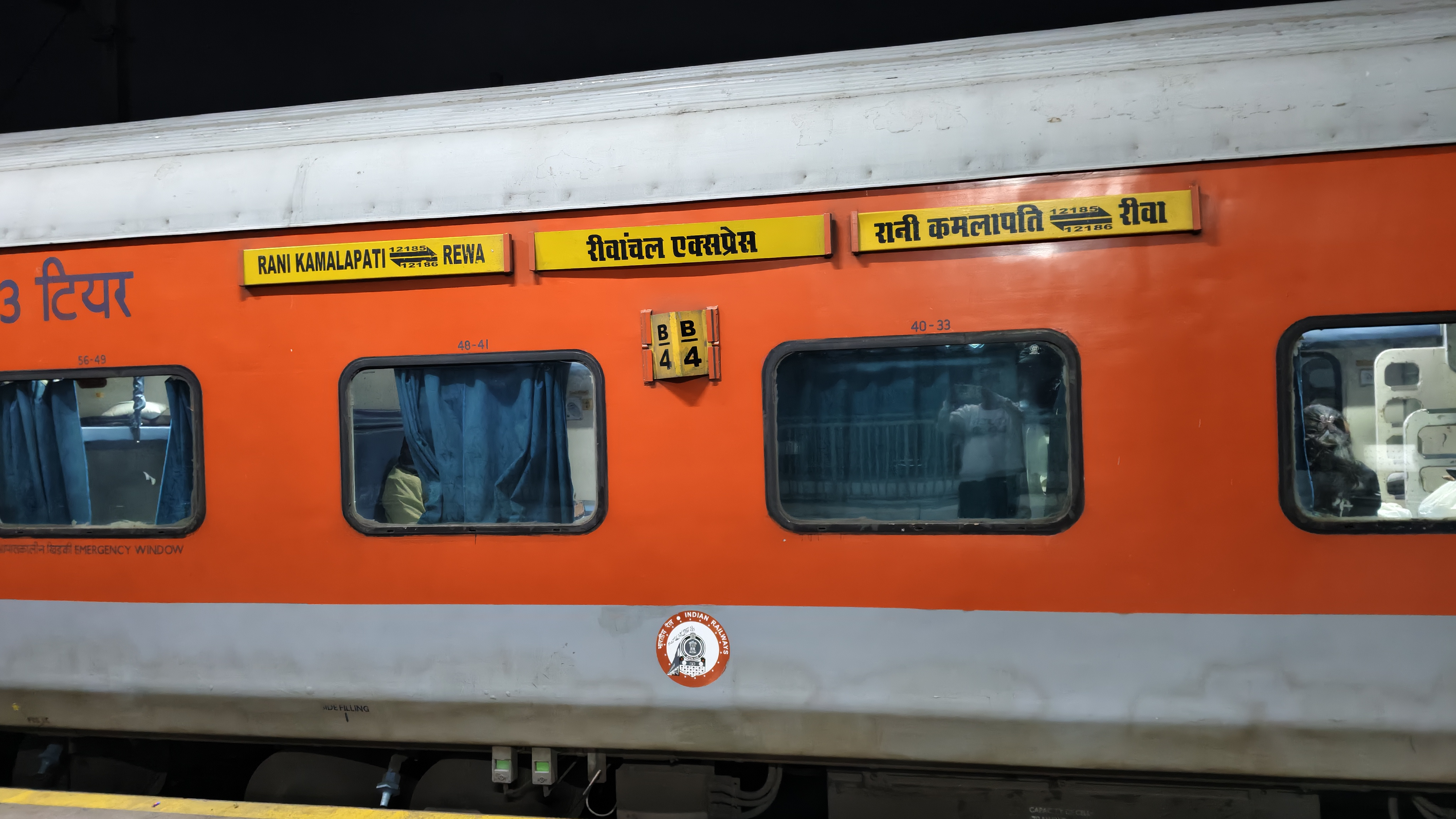
Rewanchal Express at Rani Kamalapati railway station

The train No.12185 departs daily from Rani Kamalapati at 22:00 hrs and reaches Rewa the next day at 08:00 hrs. On return, it train no. 12186 departs from Rewa daily at 19:55 hrs and reaches Rani Kamalapati at 05:35 hrs.

== Coach composition ==
The train is a Super Fast Express which consist a total number of 22 coaches :

- 1 First AC
- 2 AC 2 tier
- 6 AC 3 tier
- 2 AC 3 tier economy
- 5 sleeper class
- 4 general coaches
- 1 SLR
- 1 EOG

The coaches of the train are very neat and clean meeting up with all the world standards, hence it got an ISO certificate by Indian Railways.

== Route & halts ==
The train goes via Bina–Katni rail route. The main important halts on the way are as follows:

- Rani Kamalapati
- Bhopal Junction
- Vidisha
- Ganj Basoda
- Mandi Bamora
- Bina Junction
- Khurai
- Saugor
- Patharia
- Damoh
- Katni Murwara
- Maihar
- Satna
- Rewa.

== Traction ==
As the route is fully electrified, it is hauled by a Itarsi Loco Shed based WAP-7 electric locomotive on its entire journey.

== Events in line's history ==
- There were two Rewanchal Express (2185/2186 and 2187/2188).The 2185/2186 was running 4 days a week via. Bina and 2187/2188,3 days a week via Itarsi. Later the train via Itarsi was cancelled and replaced by Jabalpur-Indore Express. Also the train number, 2185/2186 via Bina was made daily.
- The train number 12187/12188 is still shared by Jabalpur–Mumbai Garibrath Express
- The train received an ISO 9001:2000 certificate in 2001.
