= Amla Junction railway station =

Railway station in Madhya Pradesh

Amla Junction

General information
- Location: Amla, Betul district, Madhya Pradesh; India
- Coordinates: 21.9196°N 78.1232°E
- Elevation: 733 metres (2,405 ft)
- System: Indian Railways station
- Owner: Indian Railways
- Lines: Bhopal–Nagpur section Amla–Chhindwara section
- Platforms: 6
- Tracks: 9
- Connections: Auto stand

Construction
- Structure type: Standard (on-ground station)
- Parking: Yes
- Cycle facilities: Yes
- Accessible: Available

Other information
- Status: Functioning
- Station code: AMLA
- Zone(s): Central Railway
- Division(s): Nagpur CR

History
- Opened: 1905
Location
- Location within Madhya Pradesh Location within India

Amla Junction railway station is a main railway station in Betul district, Madhya Pradesh. Its code is AMLA. It serves Amla city. The station consists of six platforms.

Amla Junction is on broad-gauge lines which connects to Itarsi in the north, Nagpur in the southeast and Chhindwara in the east.

== Trains ==
- Andaman Express
- Gomti Sagar Express
- Chhattisgarh Express
- Panchvalley Passenger
- Deekshabhoomi Express
- Patalkot Express (via Amla)
- Nagpur–Rewa Superfast Express
- Jaipur–Secunderabad Express
- Amla–Betul Passenger
- Betul–Chhindwara Passenger
- Itarsi–Nagpur Passenger
- Amla–Chhindwara Passenger
- Amla–Nagpur Passenger
- Dakshin Express
- Gorakhpur–Secunderabad Express
- Amravati–Jabalpur Superfast Express
- Ahilyanagari Express
- Dr. Ambedkar Nagar–Nagpur Superfast Express
- Dadadham Intercity Express (via Itarsi)
- Gorakhpur–Yesvantpur Express
- Bhusaval–Hazrat Nizamuddin Gondwana Superfast Express
- Hazrat Nizamuddin–Raigarh Gondwana Superfast Express
- Thiruvananthapuram Swarna Jayanti Express
- Grand Trunk Express
- Raptisagar Express
- Indore–Nagpur Tri Shatabdi Express
- Visakhapatnam–Hazrat Nizamuddin Link Superfast Express.
