= Rewa–Dr. Ambedkar Nagar Express =

Rewa - Dr. Ambedkar Nagar Express
Overview
- Service type: Express
- First service: 5 March 2013; 12 years ago
- Current operator: West Central Railway zone

Route
- Termini: Rewa Terminal (REWA); Dr. Ambedkar Nagar (DADN)
- Stops: 19
- Distance travelled: 831 km (516 mi)
- Average journey time: 15 hours 55 minutes
- Service frequency: Tri-weekly (Note: Runs three days in a week for every direction.)
- Train number: 11703/11704

On-board services
- Classes: AC First Class, AC 2 Tier, AC 3 Tier, Sleeper, Unreserved
- Seating arrangements: Yes
- Sleeping arrangements: Yes
- Catering facilities: No
- Entertainment facilities: No
- Baggage facilities: Below the seats

Technical
- Rolling stock: 2
- Track gauge: 1,676 mm (5 ft 6 in)
- Operating speed: 51 km/h (32 mph)

The 11703/11704 Rewa–Dr. Ambedkar Nagar Express is a tri-weekly Express train service connecting Dr. Ambedkar Nagar of Indore, the largest city and commercial hub of Central Indian state Madhya Pradesh and Rewa Terminal, a major city in Madhya Pradesh, India. Train was announced in Railway Budget 2012–13 and the train was flagged off on 5 March 2013 from Indore Junction.

In July 2017, the service of the train was extended up to Dr. Ambedkar Nagar on tri-weekly basis.

== Coach composition ==
The train consists of 24 coaches:

- 1 AC First Class
- 1 AC II Tier
- 4 AC III Tier
- 10 Sleeper Class
- 6 General Unreserved
- 1 Seating cum Luggage Rake

== Service ==
The 11703/Rewa–Dr. Ambedkar Nagar Express has an average speed of 49 km/h and covers 831 km in 16 hrs 50 mins.

The 11704/Dr. Ambedkar Nagar–Rewa Express has an average speed of 52 km/h and covers 831 km in 15 hrs 55 mins.

== Routes and halts ==
The important halts of the train are:

- Rewa Terminal
- Satna Junction
- Maihar
- Katni Murwara
- Damoh
- Saugor
- Khurai
- Bina Junction
- Mandi Bamora
- Vidisha
- Sant Hirdaram Nagar
- Sehore
- Shujalpur
- Berchha
- Ujjain Junction
- Dewas Junction
- Indore Junction
- Dr. Ambedkar Nagar

== Schedule ==
Train number	Station code	Departure station	Departure time	Departure day	Arrival station	Arrival time	Arrival day
11703	REWA	Rewa Termina}	23:10 PM	Sun, Tue, Thu	Dr. Ambedkar Nagar	16:00 PM	Mon, Wed, Fri
11704	DADN	Dr. Ambedkar Nagar	20:20 PM	Mon, Wed, Fri	Rewa Terminal	12:15 PM	Tue, Thu, Sat

== Direction reversal ==
Train reverses its direction 1 times at:

- Ujjain Junction

== Traction ==
Both trains are hauled by a Katni Loco Shed-based WDM-3A diesel locomotive from Rewa to Katni after which an Itarsi Loco Shed-based WAP-4 electric locomotive haul the train for the remainder of its journey until Mhow and vice versa.

== See also ==
- Bhopal–Jodhpur Express
- Jabalpur–Jodhpur Express
- Indore–Guwahati Weekly Express
