= Mandi Bamora railway station =

Railway station in Madhya Pradesh

Mandi Bamora

General information
- Location: Mandi Bamora, Sagar district, Madhya Pradesh; India
- Coordinates: 24°03′12″N 78°04′56″E
- Elevation: 413 metres (1,355 ft)
- System: Indian Railways station
- Owner: Indian Railways
- Operator: West Central Railway
- Line: Agra–Bhopal section
- Platforms: 4
- Tracks: 4

Construction
- Structure type: Standard on ground
- Parking: Yes
- Cycle facilities: No

Other information
- Status: Functioning
- Station code: MABA
- Zone(s): West Central Railway
- Division(s): Bhopal
Location
- Location within India Location within Madhya Pradesh

Mandi Bamora railway station is located in Sagar district of Madhya Pradesh and serves Mandi Bamora town. Its code is "MABA". Passenger, Express, and Superfast trains halt here.

== Trains ==
The following trains halt at Mandi Bamora railway station in both directions:

- Bhopal–Khajuraho Mahamana Superfast Express
- Rewa–Dr. Ambedkar Nagar Express
- Vindhyachal Express
- Bhopal–Damoh Rajya Rani Express
- Dakshin Express
- Chhattisgarh Express
- Mumbai CST–Amritsar Express
- Somnath–Jabalpur Express (via Bina)
- Rewanchal Express
