= Gomti Sagar Express =

Train in India

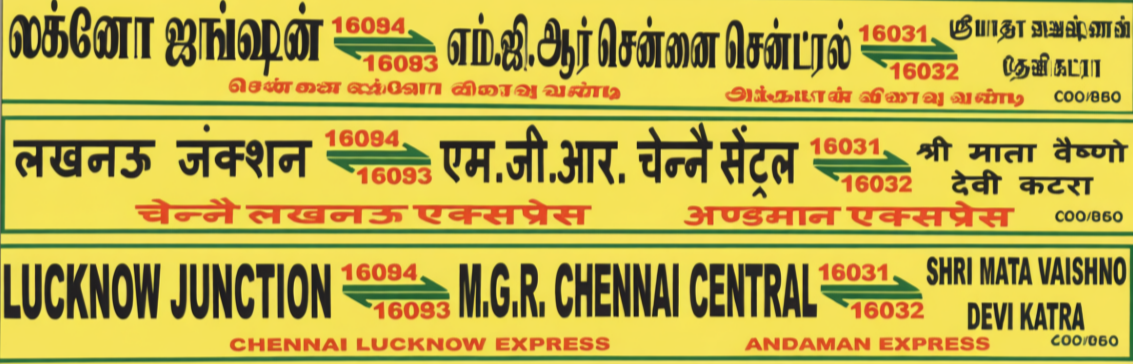

Overview
- Service type: Express
- First service: 1 January 1991; 35 years ago
- Current operator: Southern Railways

Route
- Termini: Chennai Central (MAS); Lucknow Charbagh (LKO)
- Stops: 45 as 16093, 44 as 16094
- Distance travelled: 2,088 km (1,297 mi)
- Average journey time: 39 hours 25 minutes as 16093, 41 hours 50 minutes as 16094
- Service frequency: Bi-weekly
- Train number: 16093 / 16094

On-board services
- Classes: AC 3 Tier, Sleeper class, General Unreserved
- Seating arrangements: Yes
- Sleeping arrangements: Yes
- Catering facilities: Available but no pantry car
- Observation facilities: Rake sharing with 16031 / 16032 Andaman Express

Technical
- Rolling stock: LHB coach
- Track gauge: 1,676 mm (5 ft 6 in)
- Operating speed: 55 km/h (34 mph) average including halts
Route map
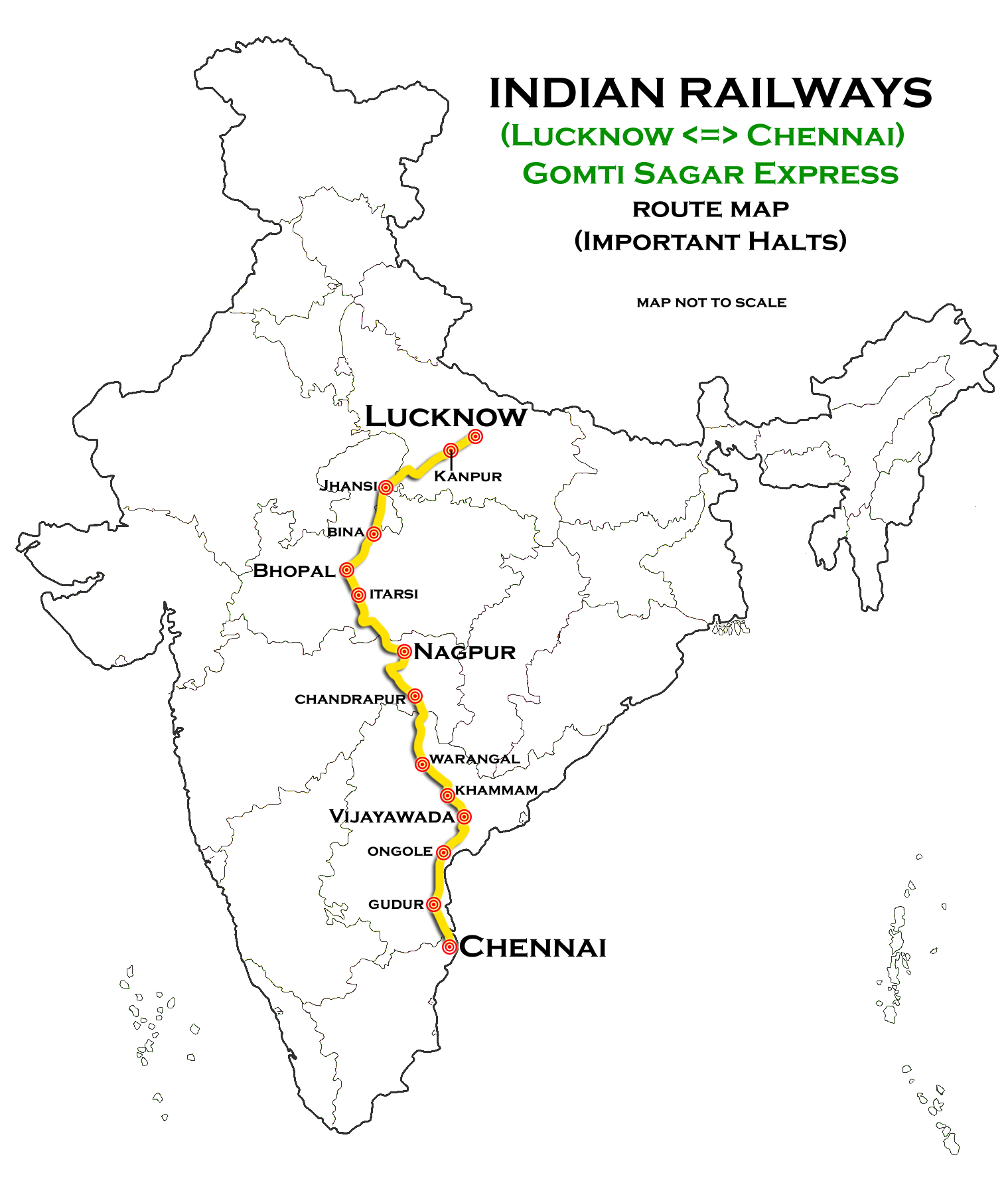

The 16093 / 16094 Gomti Sagar Express is an Express train belonging to Indian Railways Southern Railway zone that runs between Chennai Central and Lucknow Charbagh in India.

It operates as train number 16093 from Chennai Central to Lucknow Charbagh and as train number 16094 in the reverse direction serving the states of Tamil Nadu, Andhra Pradesh, Telangana, Maharashtra, Madhya Pradesh and Uttar Pradesh.

== Coaches ==
The 16093 / 94 Gomti Sagar Express has three AC 3 Tier, 8 Sleeper class, six General Unreserved and two SLR (seating with luggage rake) coaches and two high-capacity parcel van coaches. It does not carry a pantry car.

As is customary with most train services in India, coach composition may be amended at the discretion of Indian Railways depending on demand.

== Service ==
The 16093 Chennai Central–Lucknow Charbagh Gomti Sagar Express covers the distance of 2,089 km (1,298 mi) in 39 hours 20 mins (53 km/h) and in 42 hours 00 mins as the 16094 Lucknow Charbagh–Chennai Central Gomti Sagar Express (50 km/h).

As the average speed of the train is slightly above 55 km/h (34 mph), as per railway rules, its fare includes a Superfast surcharge.

== Routing ==
The 16093 / 94 Gomti Sagar Express runs from Chennai Central via Gudur Junction, Tenali Junction, Vijayawada Junction, Warangal, Balharshah Junction, Itarsi Junction, Jhansi Junction to Lucknow Charbagh.

== Traction ==
As the route is fully electrified, an Erode or Arakkonam-based WAP-4 locomotive powers the train to its destination.
