= Howrah–Prayagraj–Mumbai line =

Train line in India

Prayagraj–Mumbai main line
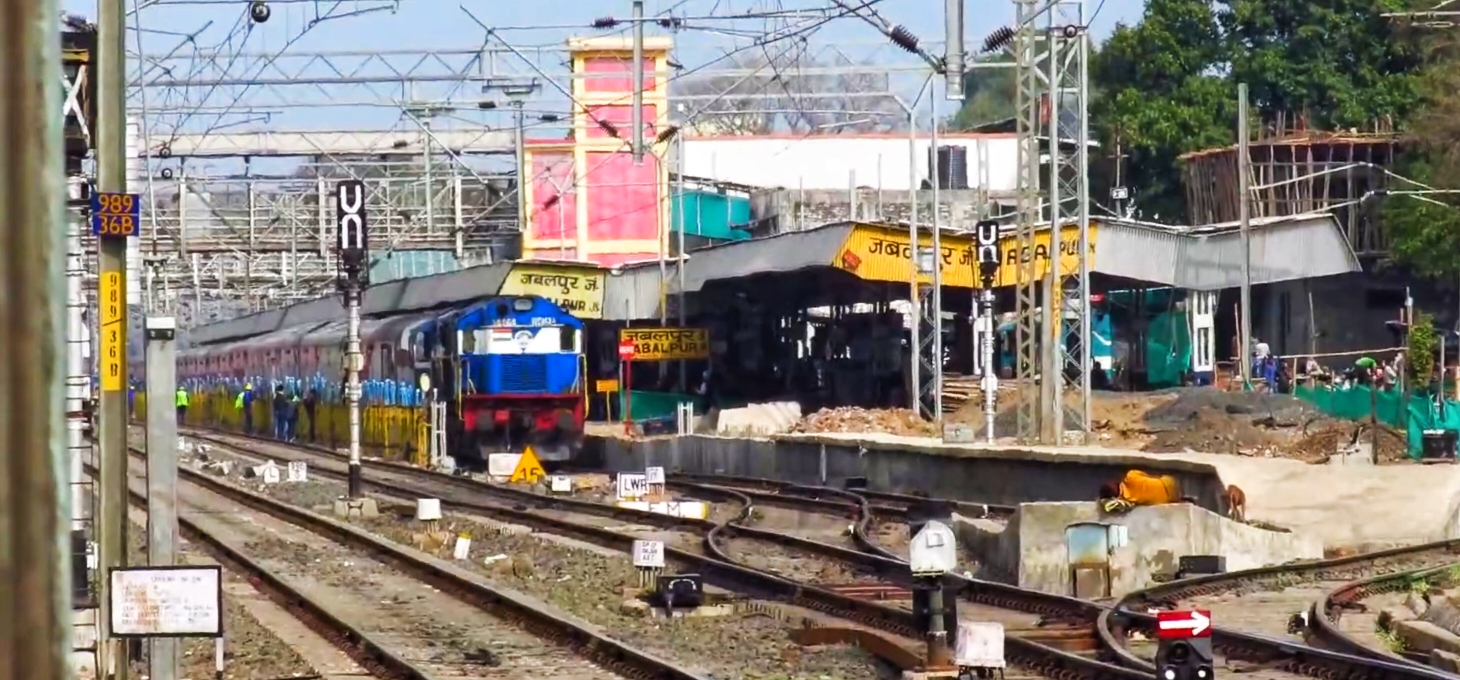
- Jabalpur Junction is an important railway station on Prayagraj–Mumbai main line

Overview
- Status: Operational
- Owner: Indian Railways
- Locale: Uttar Pradesh, Madhya Pradesh, Maharashtra
- Termini: Prayagraj Junction; Mumbai CST

Service
- System: Fully electrified
- Operator(s): East Central Railway, North Central Railway, West Central Railway, Central Railway
- Depot(s): Kalyan Junction railway station, Bhusawal, Itarsi Junction railway station, Katni

History
- Opened: 1870

Technical
- Line length: 1341 KM
- Track length: 1341 KM: Prayagraj–Jabalpur section, Jabalpur–Bhusaval section, Bhusawal–Kalyan section, Kalyan–Mumbai CST section
- Track gauge: 1,676 mm (5 ft 6 in)
- Electrification: Fully electrified
- Operating speed: up to 130 km/h (81 mph)
- Highest elevation: Lowest at Howrah 8 metres (26 ft) (approx). Highest at Thull Ghats 1,849 feet (564 m) (approx)

The Prayagraj–Mumbai main line is a railway line connecting Prayagraj in Uttar Pradesh with Mumbai in Maharashtra. It passes through Madhya Pradesh and connects with the wider Howrah–Mumbai rail route via Prayagraj. The line is 1,341 km (833 mi) long and was opened to traffic in 1870.

The following are the routes from Mumbai to Howrah via Prayagraj, with two alternatives from DDU via Gaya and Patna.

== Via Mumbai–Prayagraj–DDU–Gaya ==
1. Kalyan–Mumbai section
2. Bhusawal–Kalyan section
3. Khandwa–Bhusawal section
4. Itarsi–Khandwa section
5. Jabalpur–Itarsi section
6. Gaya–Jabalpur section
7. DDU–Gaya section
8. Prayagraj–DDU section
9. Asansol–Prayagraj section
10. Bardhaman–Asansol section
11. Howrah–Bardhaman chord

== Via Mumbai–Prayagraj–DDU–Patna ==
1. Kalyan–Mumbai section
2. Bhusawal–Kalyan section
3. Khandwa–Bhusawal section
4. Itarsi–Khandwa section
5. Jabalpur–Itarsi section
6. Patna–Jabalpur section
7. DDU–Patna section
8. Prayagraj–DDU section
9. Asansol–Prayagraj section
10. Bardhaman–Asansol section
11. Howrah–Bardhaman chord

== Sections ==
For more detailed study the cross-country line has been divided into smaller sections:

1. Prayagraj–Jabalpur section
2. Jabalpur–Bhusaval section
3. Bhusawal–Kalyan section
4. Kalyan–Mumbai CST section

The 1,341 km (833 mi) main line has been treated in more detail in smaller sections:

1. Prayagraj–Manikpur section
2. Manikpur–Satna section
3. Satna–Jabalpur section
4. Jabalpur–Itarsi section
5. Itarsi–Khandwa section
6. Khandwa–Bhusawal section
7. Bhusawal–Manmad section
8. Manmad–Nashik Road section
9. Nashik Road–Kalyan section
10. Kalyan–Mumbai section

== History ==
The first train in India traveled from Bombay to Thane on 16 April 1853. By May 1854, Great Indian Peninsula Railway's Bombay–Thane line was extended to Kalyan. It was extended to Khopoli via Palasdhari in 1855. Bhusawal station was set up in 1860 and Pune connected in 1863. In Eastern India, construction of the Howrah–Delhi main line was completed and through connection between Delhi and Kolkata was established in 1865. The last link was the bridge across the Yamuna at Prayagraj. In 1866 Bhusawal-Khandwa section was opened and GIPR also extended its operations to Nagpur. East Indian Railway, which had established the Howrah–Allahabad–Delhi line, opened the Allahabad–Jabalpur branch line in June 1867. GIPR connection over the Thull Ghat reached Jabalpur from Itarsi on 7 March 1870, linking up with EIR track there from Allahabad, and establishing connectivity between Mumbai and Kolkata.

The Bengal Nagpur Railway was formed in 1887 for the purpose of upgrading the Nagpur Chhattisgarh Railway and then extending it via Bilaspur to Asansol, in order to develop a shorter Howrah–Mumbai route than the one via Allahabad. The Bengal Nagpur Railway main line from Nagpur to Asansol, on the Howrah–Delhi main line, was opened for goods traffic on 1 February 1891. It was only after Kharagpur was linked from the west and the south that it was connected to Howrah in 1900.

The opening of this track was part of the inspiration for the French writer Jules Verne's book Around the World in Eighty Days. At the opening ceremony, the Viceroy Lord Mayo concluded that "it was thought desirable that, if possible, at the earliest possible moment, the whole country should be covered with a network of lines in a uniform system."

== Electrification ==
In August 1976, the New Delhi–Howrah route (via Grand Chord), and that includes the Howrah–Allahabad section of the Howrah–Allahabad–Mumbai line, was the first trunk route in the country to be completely electrified with AC traction. Itarsi - Bhusawal - Mumbai CSMT was also electrified with AC traction. Electrification of Itarsi - Jabalpur - Allahabad was proposed in Railway Budget of 2011. The entire route was divided into sections and electrification was completed in parts. In March 2020, electrification of last remaining stretch betweek Katni Jn. and Satna was also done, thereby the Howrah Allahabad Mumbai route became completely electrified.

== Speed limits ==
Most of the Howrah–Gaya–Delhi line and Howrah–Bardhaman chord (the line is common with this line up to Allahabad) is classified as 'A' class line where trains can run up to 160 kilometres per hour (99 mph) but in certain sections speeds may be limited to 120–130 kilometres per hour (75–81 mph). The line from Bhusawal to Mumbai is also classified as 'A' class. The Allahabad–Bhusawal sector is classified as 'B' class where trains can run up to 130 km/h.

== Calcutta Mail ==
The Imperial Indian Mail (now called 12321 up /12322 down Howrah–Mumbai Mail via Jabalpur), running on this route, was possibly the first named train of Indian Railways. The Mumbai–Howrah Mail via Allahabad is called Calcutta Mail between Mumbai and Allahabad, and Mumbai Mail (some still call it by its old name, Bombay Mail) between Allahabad(Now Prayagraj) and Howrah. It is still running for 151 years as the oldest active train on this route covering 2,160-kilometre-long (1,340 mi) distance in 37 hours and 30 mins with an average running speed of 57.6 kilometres per hour (35.8 mph) .

== Inspiration for writing ==
The Kolkata–Mumbai linkage, along with other events, inspired the French writer Jules Verne to write his book Around the World in Eighty Days.
