= Lokmanya Tilak Terminus–Karimnagar Express =

Train in India

Lokmanya Tilak Terminus - Karimnagar Express

Overview
- Service type: Express
- First service: 27 October 2013; 12 years ago
- Current operator: Central Railways

Route
- Termini: Lokmanya Tilak Terminus (LTT); Karimnagar (KRMR)
- Stops: 23
- Distance travelled: 848 km (527 mi)
- Average journey time: 16 hours 35 minutes as 11205 Lokmanya Tilak Terminus–Karimnagar Express * 14 hours 40 minutes as 11206 Karimnagar–Lokmanya Tilak Terminus Express
- Service frequency: Once a week * 11205 Lokmanya Tilak Terminus–Karimnagar Express–Saturday * 11206 Karimnagar–Lokmanya Tilak Terminus Express – Sunday.
- Train number: 11205 / 11206

On-board services
- Classes: AC 2 tier, AC 3 tier, Sleeper Class, General Unreserved
- Seating arrangements: Yes
- Sleeping arrangements: Yes
- Catering facilities: No pantry car attached
- Observation facilities: Rake sharing with 11201 / 02 Lokmanya Tilak Terminus–Ajni Express

Technical
- Rolling stock: Standard LHB coach
- Track gauge: 1,676 mm (5 ft 6 in)
- Operating speed: 110 km/h (68 mph) maximum 45.12 km/h (28 mph) including halts
Route map
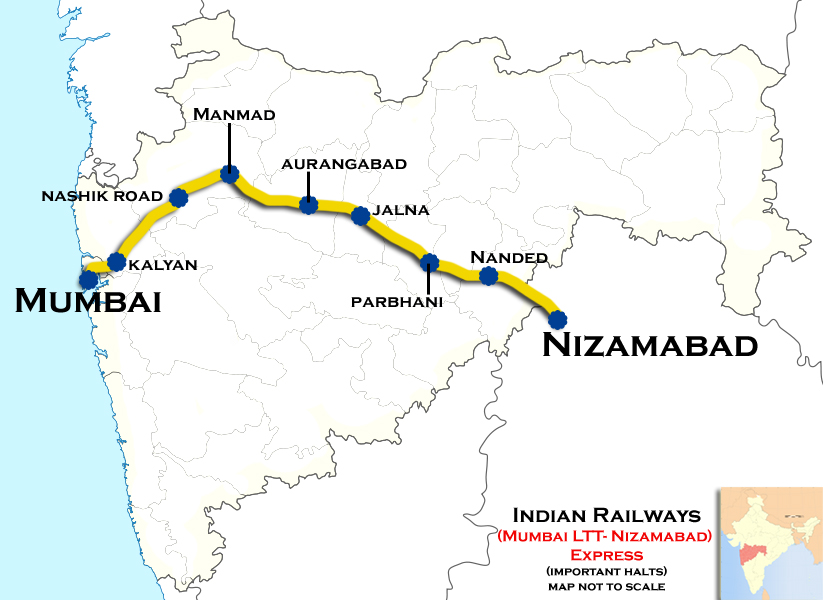

The 11205 / 06 Lokmanya Tilak Terminus–Karimnagar Express is an Express train belonging to Indian Railways – Central Railway zone that runs between Lokmanya Tilak Terminus and Karimnagar in India.

It operates as train number 11205 from Lokmanya Tilak Terminus to Karimnagar and as train number 11206 in the reverse direction, serving the states of Maharashtra and Telangana.

It was started as Lokmanya Tilak Terminus–Nizamabad Express on 27 October 2013, after 5 years on 26 December 2018 it was extended to Karimnagar and now runs as Lokmanya Tilak Terminus–Karimnagar Express.

== Coaches ==
The 11205 / 06 Lokmanya Tilak Terminus–Karimnagar Express has 1 AC 2 tier, 2 AC 3 tier, 6 Sleeper Class, 11 General Unreserved and 2 SLR (Seating cum Luggage Rake) coaches. It does not carry a pantry car.

As is customary with most train services in India, coach composition may be amended at the discretion of Indian Railways depending on demand.

== Rake sharing ==
The 11205 / 06 Lokmanya Tilak Terminus–Karimnagar Express has a rake sharing arrangement with 11202 / 01 Lokmanya Tilak Terminus–Ajni Express as follows:

- 11205 Lokmanya Tilak Terminus–Karimnagar Express leaves Lokmanya Tilak Terminus on Saturday reaching Karimnagar on Sunday.
- 11206 Karimnagar–Lokmanya Tilak Terminus Express leaves Karimnagar on Sunday arriving at Lokmanya Tilak Terminus on Monday.

== Service ==
11205 Lokmanya Tilak Terminus–Karimnagar Express covers the distance of 705 kilometres (438 mi) in 16 hours 35 mins (42.51 km/h) and in 14 hours 40 mins as 11206 Karimnagar–Lokmanya Tilak Terminus Express (48.07 km/h).

== Routing ==
The 11205 / 06 Lokmanya Tilak Terminus–Karimnagar Express runs from Lokmanya Tilak Terminus via Kalyan Junction, Igatpuri, Nasik Road, Manmad Junction, Aurangabad, Jalna, Parbhani Junction, Hazur Sahib Nanded, Nizamabad, Armoor, Koratla, Jagtial and Karimnagar.

== Traction ==
As entire route is fully electrified an Electric Loco Shed, Kalyan-based WAP-7 locomotive powers the train for its entire journey.
