= Jabalpur–Bhusaval section =

Railway section in India

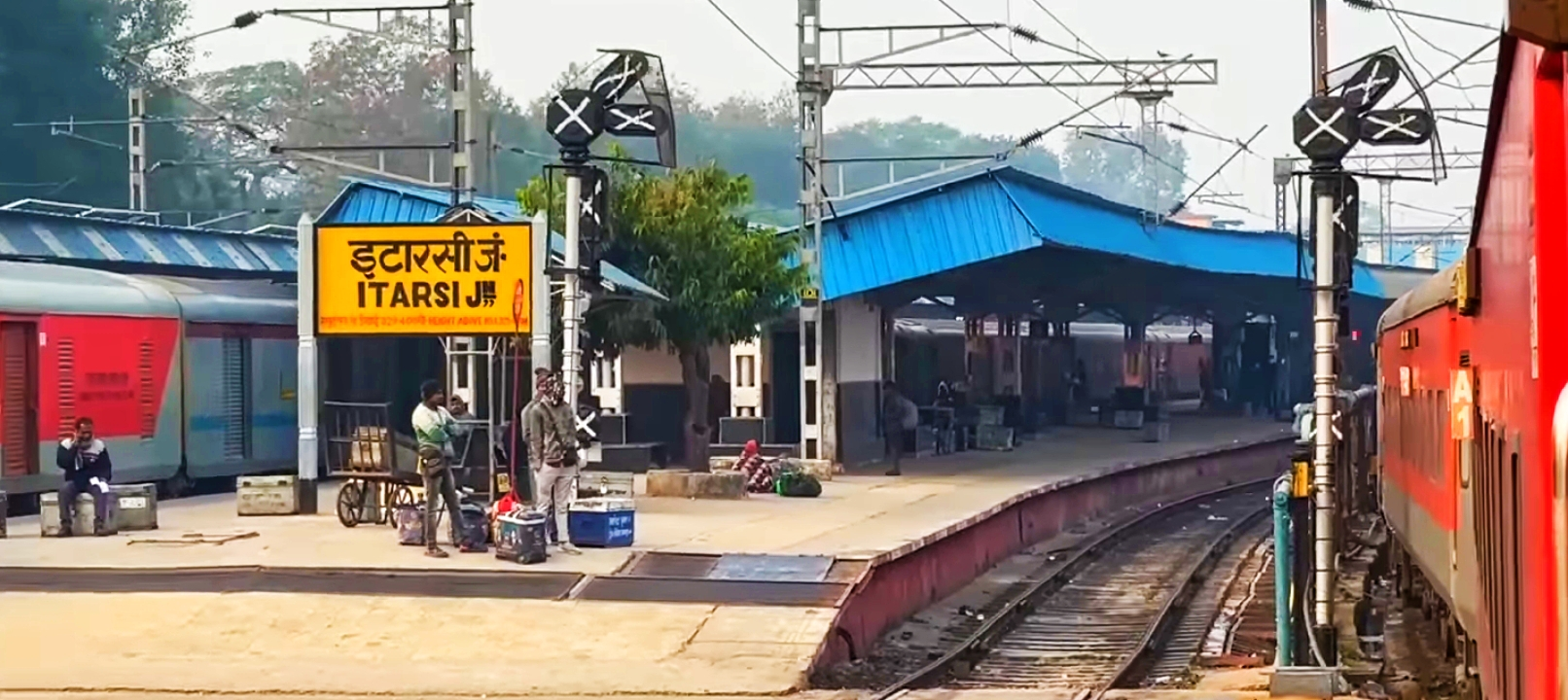
- Itarsi Junction is an important Railway Station on Jabalpur–Bhusaval section

Overview
- Status: Operational
- Owner: Indian Railways
- Locale: Narmada Valley, Tapti Valley, hilly region in between
- Termini: Jabalpur (Station Code JBP); Bhusaval (Station Code BSL)

Service
- Services: Howrah–Allahabad–Mumbai line
- Operator(s): North Central Railway; West Central Railway
- Depot(s): Itarsi, Bhusaval
- Rolling stock: WDM-2, WDM-3A, WDM-3D, WDS-6 and WDP-4 diesel locos; and WAM-4, WAP- 4, WAG-5, WAG-7 and WCM-6 electric locomotives.

History
- Opened: 1870

Technical
- Track length: New Alignment from 2004 551 km (342 mi). Old Alignment until 2004 537 km (334 mi)
- Number of tracks: 2
- Track gauge: 5 ft 6 in (1,676 mm) broad gauge
- Electrification: Yes
- Operating speed: up to 130 km/h

The Jabalpur–Bhusaval section is a railway line connecting Jabalpur, Madhya Pradesh and Bhusaval, Maharashtra. This 552 km (343 mi) track is part of the Howrah–Allahabad–Mumbai line, one of the busiest railways in India. The line is under the jurisdiction of West Central Railway and Central Railway.

== History ==
The Great Indian Peninsula Railway's pioneering Bombay–Thane line was extended to Kalyan Junction in May 1854. Bhusaval Junction station was set up in 1860. In 1866 Bhusaval-Khandwa section was opened. The GIPR connection reached Jabalpur from Itarsi on 7 March 1870, linking up with the East Indian Railway Company track there from Allahabad, and establishing connectivity between Mumbai and Kolkata. Before construction of Indira Sagar Dam in 2004 on Narmada Valley, the route was 537 km (334 mi) long. The old alignment got submerged in 2004 due to Indira Sagar Dam & a new alignment was made which increased the route distance by 14 km (9 mi).

== Electrification ==
While the Itarsi–Harda sector was electrified in 1990–91, the Harda–Khandwa–Bhusaval sector was electrified the next year. The 605 kilometres (376 mi) long Naini Junction–Manikpur Junction–Satna Junction-Katni Junction-Jabalpur–Itarsi route has been completely electrified under Vision 2020 – A Blue print for Railway Electrification Programme.

== Speed limits ==
The Howrah–Allahabad–Mumbai line is classified as 'B' class where trains can run up to 130 kilometres per hour (81 mph).

== Passenger movement ==
Jabalpur (Station Code JBP), Itarsi and Bhusaval (Station Code BSL)are amongst the top hundred booking stations of Indian Railway.

== Loco sheds ==
Itarsi diesel shed holds 145+ locos. It has WDM-2, WDM-3A, WDM-3D, WDS-6 and WDP-4 diesel locos. This shed serves routes all across central India. Itarsi electric loco shed came up in the 1980s. It holds WAM-4, WAP-4 and WAG-5 electric locos. Its WAG-5 locos perform banking duties on the Budni–Barkhera ghat section. Bhusaval electric loco shed has WAM-4, WAP-4, WAG-5, WAG-7 and WCM-6 locomotives.
