= DDU =

DDU, Ddu, DdU, D.D.U., or D.D.U may refer to:

- Deen Dayal Upadhyaya Hospital, Shimla, India
- Dumont d'Urville Station, a French scientific station in Antarctica
- Dymaxion Deployment Unit, a temporary housing unit designed by R. Buckminster Fuller for the United States Army in 1940
- Delivered Duty Unpaid, an international commercial term; see Incoterm
- DDU: District Detective Unit, an Irish police procedural drama from RTÉ
- Drug Dependency Unit, a special centre in the UK where drug addicts are treated, see Brain Committee for first use
- German Democratic Union (Deutsche Demokratische Union), a left-wing political party in Saarland, Germany
- Pt. Deen Dayal Upadhyaya Junction, station code: DDU
- Display Driver Uninstaller, a popular GPU driver removal tool for Nvidia, AMD, and Intel graphics cards

== See also ==
- "Ddu-Du Ddu-Du", 2018 song by K-pop group Blackpink
