= Narsinghpur railway station =

Railway station in Madhya Pradesh

Narsinghpur
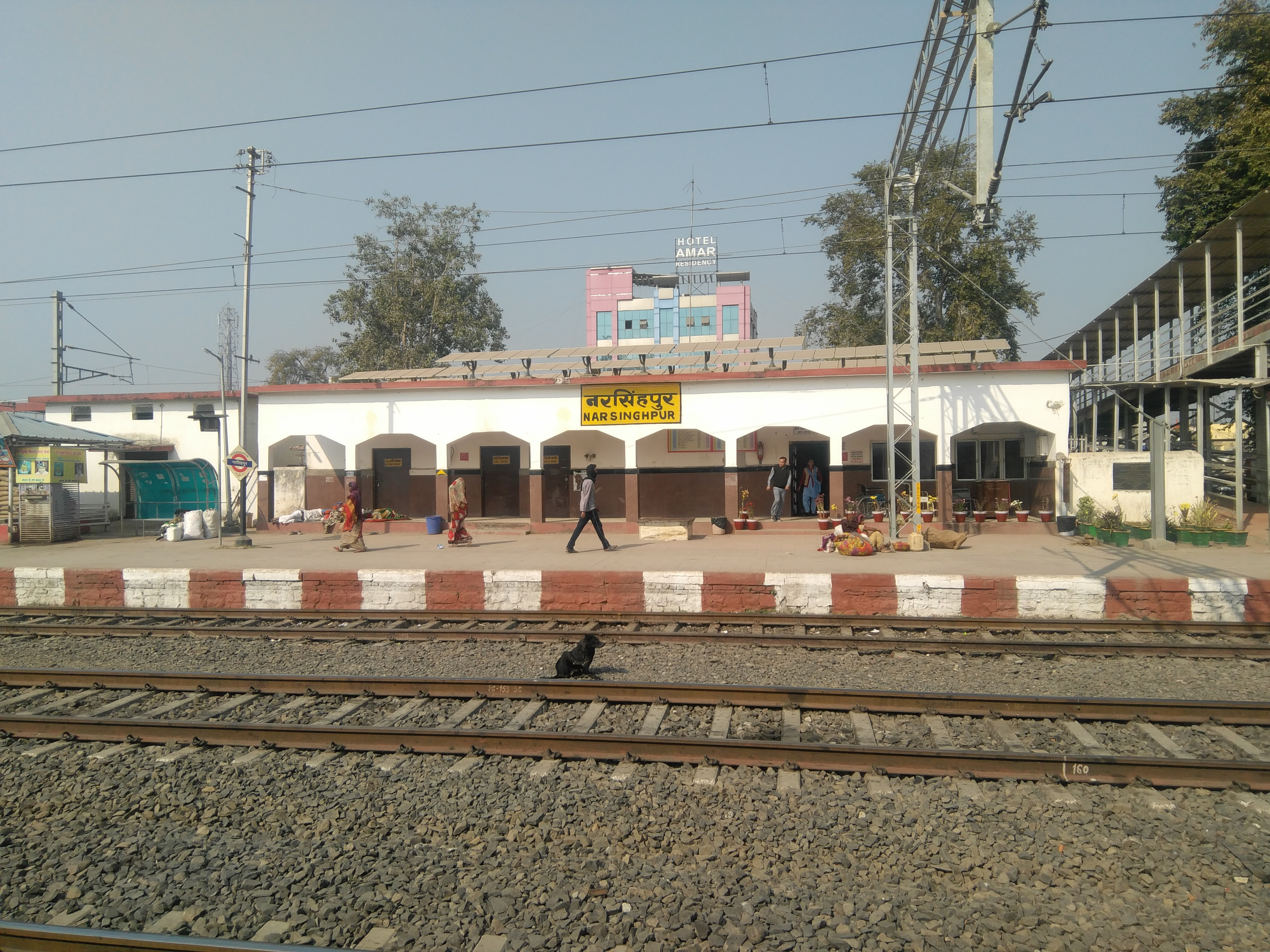

General information
- Location: Narsinghpur, Narsinghpur district, Madhya Pradesh; India
- Coordinates: 22°56′35″N 79°12′51″E
- Elevation: 364 metres (1,194 ft)
- System: Indian Railways station
- Owner: Indian Railways
- Operator: West Central Railway
- Line: Jabalpur–Bhusaval section
- Platforms: 2
- Tracks: 2

Construction
- Structure type: Standard (on ground)
- Parking: Yes

Other information
- Status: Functioning
- Station code: NU
- Zone(s): West Central Railway
- Division(s): Jabalpur
Location
- Location within India Location within Madhya Pradesh

Narsinghpur railway station is a railway station serving Narsinghpur city, in Narsinghpur district of Madhya Pradesh State of India. It is under Jabalpur railway division of West Central Railway Zone of Indian Railways. It is located on Jabalpur–Itarsi main line of the Indian Railways. Passenger, Express and Superfast trains halt here.

== Major trains ==
Time Tabble Narsinghpur Railway Station

- Rani Kamalapati (Habibganj)–Rewa Vande Bharat Express
- Rani Kamalapati–Jabalpur Jan Shatabdi Express
- Vindhyachal Express
- Narmada Express
- Dhanbad - Mumbai LTT Express
- Dhanbad - Coimbatore Amrit Bharat Express
