= Andaman Express =

Train in India

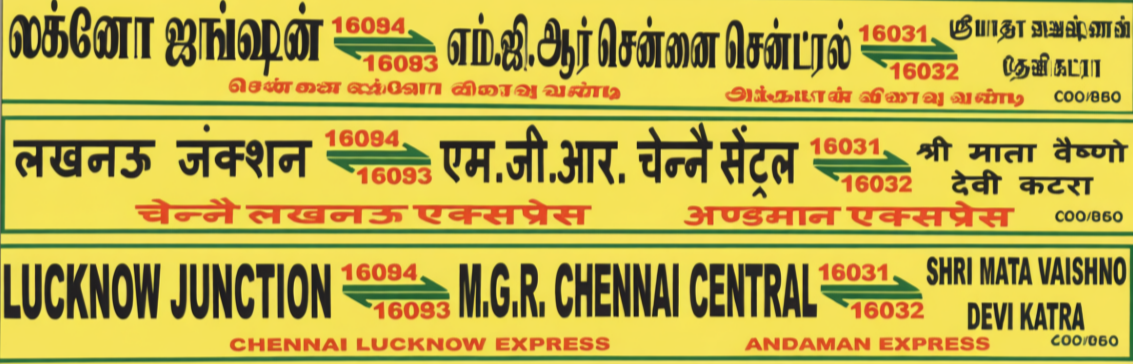

Overview
- Service type: Express
- First service: 1 May 1988; 37 years ago (Inaugural); 3 September 2015; 10 years ago (extended upto Shri Mata Vaishno Devi Katra)
- Current operator: Southern Railway

Route
- Termini: MGR Chennai Central (MAS); Shri Mata Vaishno Devi Katra (SVDK)
- Stops: 69
- Distance travelled: 2,877 km (1,788 mi)
- Average journey time: 55 hours 40 minutes
- Service frequency: Tri-weekly
- Train number: 16031 / 16032

On-board services
- Classes: AC 2 Tier, AC 3 Tier, Sleeper Class, General Unreserved
- Seating arrangements: Yes
- Sleeping arrangements: Yes
- Catering facilities: On-board catering, E-catering
- Observation facilities: Large windows
- Baggage facilities: No
- Other facilities: Below the seats

Technical
- Rolling stock: LHB coach
- Track gauge: 1,676 mm (5 ft 6 in)
- Operating speed: 50 km/h (31 mph) average including halts.
- Rake sharing: Rake sharing with 16093/16094 Gomtisagar Express
Route map
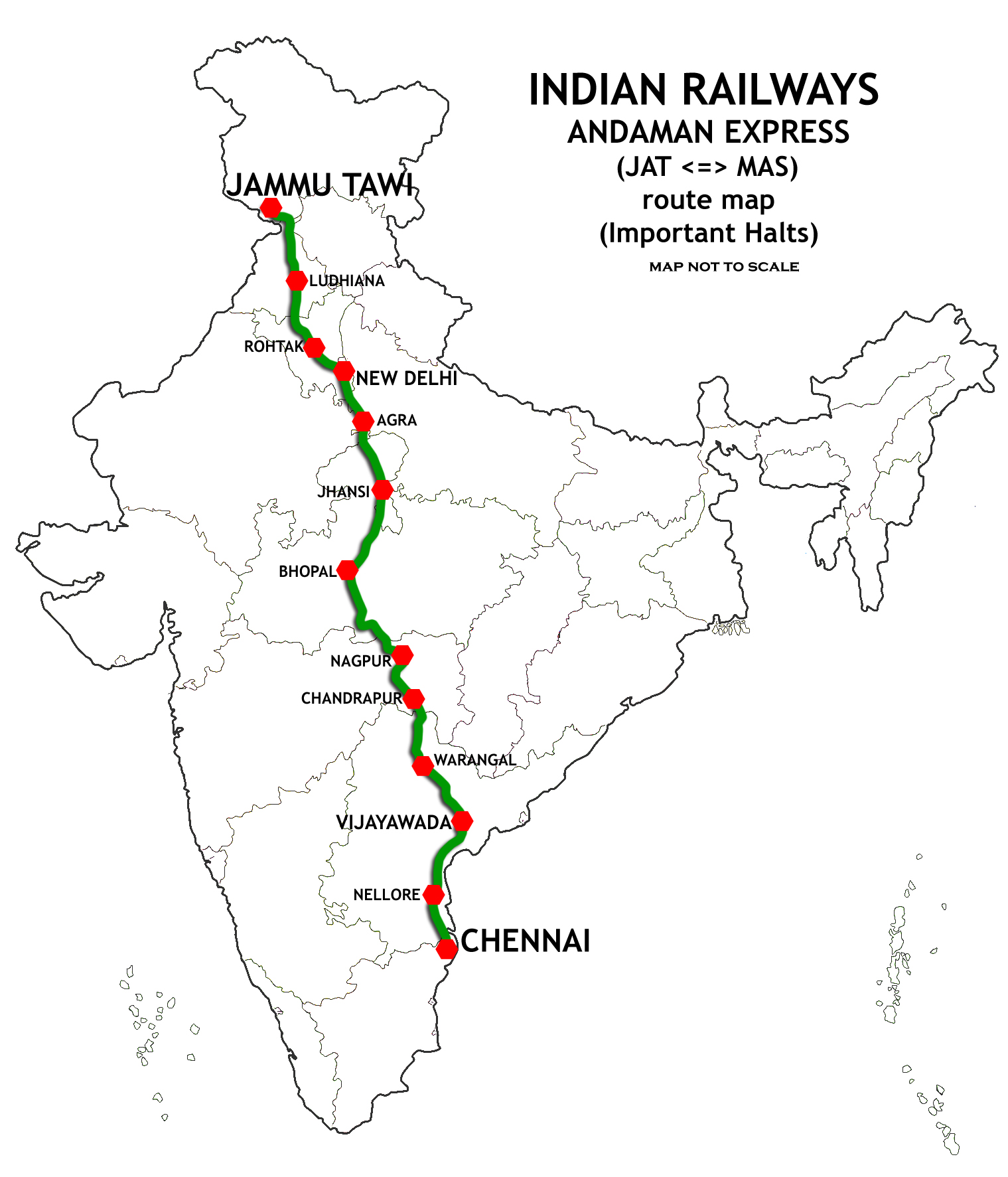

The 16031 / 16032 Andaman Express is a long-distance express train in India, connecting the cities of Chennai in Tamil Nadu and Katra, Jammu and Kashmir. It is the slowest train between New Delhi and Chennai.

== History ==
The train is named after the Andaman Islands of the country situated off the Eastern coast.

It has been extended to Shri Mata Vaishno Devi Katra of Jammu and Kashmir on 3 September 2015.

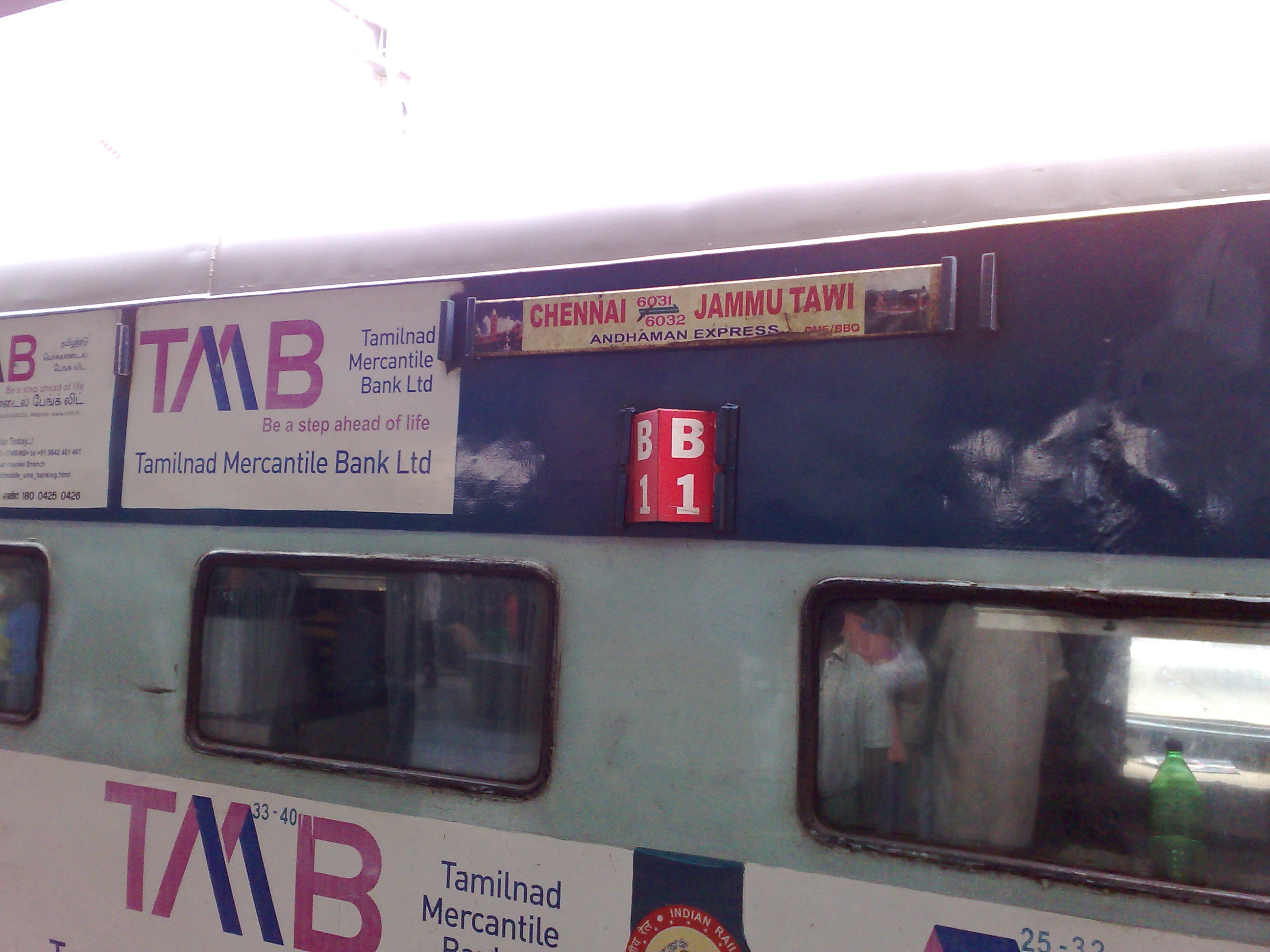
16032 Andaman Express

In 2013, an exclusive air-conditioned coach was added to the train for CAPF and other police forces for the first time in the Indian Railways.

== Traction ==
It is hauled by an Royapuram Loco Shed based WAP-7 electric locomotive from end to end.

== Service ==
The train runs three times weekly, covering a distance of 2,848 kilometres (1,770 mi) at an average speed of 50 km/h with over 79 intermediate halts in between including important stations such as Vijayawada, Warangal, Balharshah, Nagpur, Betul, Itarsi, Bhopal, Jhansi, Agra, Mathura, New Delhi, Ambala Cantonment, Ludhiana, Jalandhar, Jammu Tawi, Udhampur.

== Number and nomenclature ==
The number provided for the train is:

- 16031 – Chennai Central to Shri Mata Vaishno Devi Katra
- 16032 – Shri Mata Vaishno Devi Katra to Chennai Central

== Route and halts ==
The train runs via Sullurpeta - Nayudupeta - Gudur - Nellore - Kavali - Ongole - Chirala - Tenali – New Guntur – Vijayawada - Madhira– Khammam – Warangal – Ramagundam – Mancherial - Bellampalli - Balharshah Junction – Sewagram – Nagpur – Itarsi – Bhopal – Bina – Jhansi – Gwalior –Morena- Agra – Mathura – New Delhi – Rohtak – Jind – Narwana – Jakhal – Dhuri – Ludhiana – Jalandhar Cantonment Junction – Pathankot Cantonment – Jammu Tawi. The train stops at 69 stations.

== Coach composition ==
- 1 AC Two Tier
- 2 AC Three Tier
- 8 Sleeper class
- 5 General Unreserved
- 2 SLR coaches
- Rocket Tracks

== See also ==
- Navyug Express
- Himsagar Express
- Gomtisagar Express
