= Lokmanya Tilak Terminus–Ajni Express =

Train in India

Overview
- Service type: Express
- First service: 27 October 2013; 12 years ago
- Current operator: Central Railways

Route
- Termini: Ajni (AJNI); Lokmanya Tilak Terminus (LTT)
- Stops: 24
- Distance travelled: 1,021 km (634 mi)
- Average journey time: 21 hours 40 minutes as 11202 Ajni–Lokmanya Tilak Terminus Express, 22 hours 25 minutes as 11201 Lokmanya Tilak Terminus–Ajni Express
- Service frequency: Once a week. 11202 Ajni–Lokmanya Tilak Terminus Express – Friday, 11201 Lokmanya Tilak Terminus–AjniExpress – Monday.
- Train number: 11201/11202

On-board services
- Classes: AC 2 tier, AC 3 tier, Sleeper class, General Unreserved
- Seating arrangements: Yes
- Sleeping arrangements: Yes
- Catering facilities: No pantry car attached
- Observation facilities: Rake sharing with 11205/11206 Lokmanya Tilak Terminus–Karimnagar Express

Technical
- Rolling stock: Standard LHB coach
- Track gauge: 1,676 mm (5 ft 6 in)
- Operating speed: 110 km/h (68 mph) maximum 46.32 km/h (29 mph) average including halts

The Lokmanya Tilak Terminus–Ajni Express via [Hingoli- Aurangabad] is an Express train belonging to Indian Railways – Central Railway zone that runs between Lokmanya Tilak Terminus and Ajni in India.

It operates as train number 11202 from Ajni to Lokmanya Tilak Terminus and as train number 11201 in the reverse direction, serving the state of Maharashtra.

== Coaches ==
The 11202 / 01 Ajni–Lokmanya Tilak Terminus Express has 1 AC 2 tier, 3 AC 3 tier, 6 Sleeper class, 6 General Unreserved and 2 SLR (Seating cum Luggage Rake) coaches. It does not carry a pantry car.

As is customary with most train services in India, coach composition may be amended at the discretion of Indian Railways depending on demand.

== Rake sharing ==
The 11202 / 01 Ajni–Lokmanya Tilak Terminus Express has a rake sharing arrangement with 11205 / 06 Lokmanya Tilak Terminus–Karimnagar Express.

== Service ==
11202 Ajni–Lokmanya Tilak Terminus Express covers the distance of 1,021 km (634 mi) in 21 hours 40 mins (47.12 km/h) and in 22 hours 25 mins as 11201 Lokmanya Tilak Terminus–Ajni Express (45.55 km/h).

== Route and halts ==
The important halts of the train are:

- Lokmanya Tilak Terminus
- Thane
- Kalyan Junction
- Igatpuri
- Nasik Road
- Manmad Junction
- Rotegaon
- Lasur
- Chhatrapati Sambhajinagar
- Jalna
- Partur
- Selu
- Parbhani Junction
- Purna Junction
- Basmat
- Hingoli Deccan
- Washim
- Akola Junction
- Badnera Junction
- Wardha Junction
- Ajni

== Direction reversal ==
The train reverses its direction 1 times:

- Akola Junction

== Traction ==
Despite electrification of almost 41% of the route, a Kalyan-based WDM-3D or WDP-4D locomotive powers the train for its entire journey.

== Timings ==
- 11202 Ajni–Lokmanya Tilak Terminus Express leaves Ajni every Friday at 16:15 hrs IST and reaches Lokmanya Tilak Terminus at 13:55 hrs IST the next day.
- 11201 Lokmanya Tilak Terminus–Ajni Express leaves Lokmanya Tilak Terminus every Monday at 15:50 hrs IST and reaches Ajni at 14:15 hrs IST the next day.
