= Rewa Terminal railway station =

Railway station in Madhya Pradesh, India

Rewa Terminal
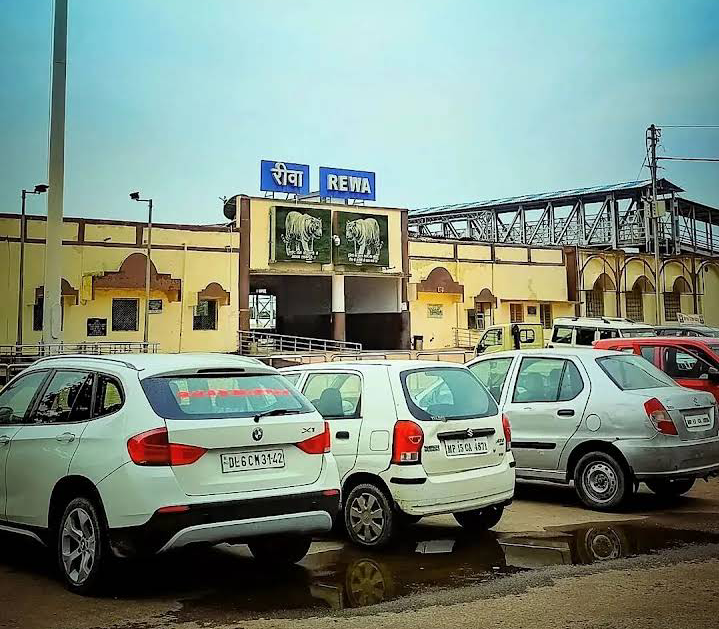

General information
- Location: NH-7, Satna Road, Godahar, Rewa district, Madhya Pradesh; India
- Coordinates: 24.5378°N 81.2516°E
- Elevation: 306 metres (1,004 ft)
- System: Express train and Passenger train station
- Owner: Indian Railways
- Operator: West Central Railway
- Line: Satna–Rewa branch line
- Platforms: 5
- Tracks: 4
- Connections: Auto stand

Construction
- Structure type: Standard (on-ground station)
- Parking: Yes
- Cycle facilities: No

Other information
- Status: Functioning
- Station code: REWA
- Zone(s): West Central Railway
- Division(s): Jabalpur
Location
- Location within India Location within Madhya Pradesh

Rewa Terminal railway station is a main railway station in Rewa district, Madhya Pradesh. Its code is REWA. It serves Rewa city. The station consists of five platforms. The station is terminal on Satna–Rewa branch line which is a Howrah–Prayagraj–Mumbai line.

== Major trains ==
- Rewa-Bhopal Holi SF Special
- Chirmiri-Rewa Express
- Ranikamlapati-Rewa Weekly Special
- Itwari-Rewa Express(via gondia)
- Mumbai CSMT-Rewa SF Special
- Jabalpur-Rewa Shuttle
- Rewanchal Express
- Madan Mahal–Rewa Intercity Express
- Rewa–Anand Vihar Superfast Express
- Rajkot–Rewa Superfast Express
- Vadodara–Rewa Mahamana Express
- Nagpur–Rewa Superfast Express
- Bilaspur–Rewa Express
- Rewa–Dr. Ambedkar Nagar Express
- Rani Kamalapati (Habibganj)–Rewa Vande Bharat Express

== Redevelopment ==
This station is getting a redevelopment, that will include modernised passenger waiting room, a tall roof plaza and an extra platform. This railway project in Rewa will cost ₹13’60’00’000
