= Satna Junction railway station =

Railway station in Madhya Pradesh

Satna Junction
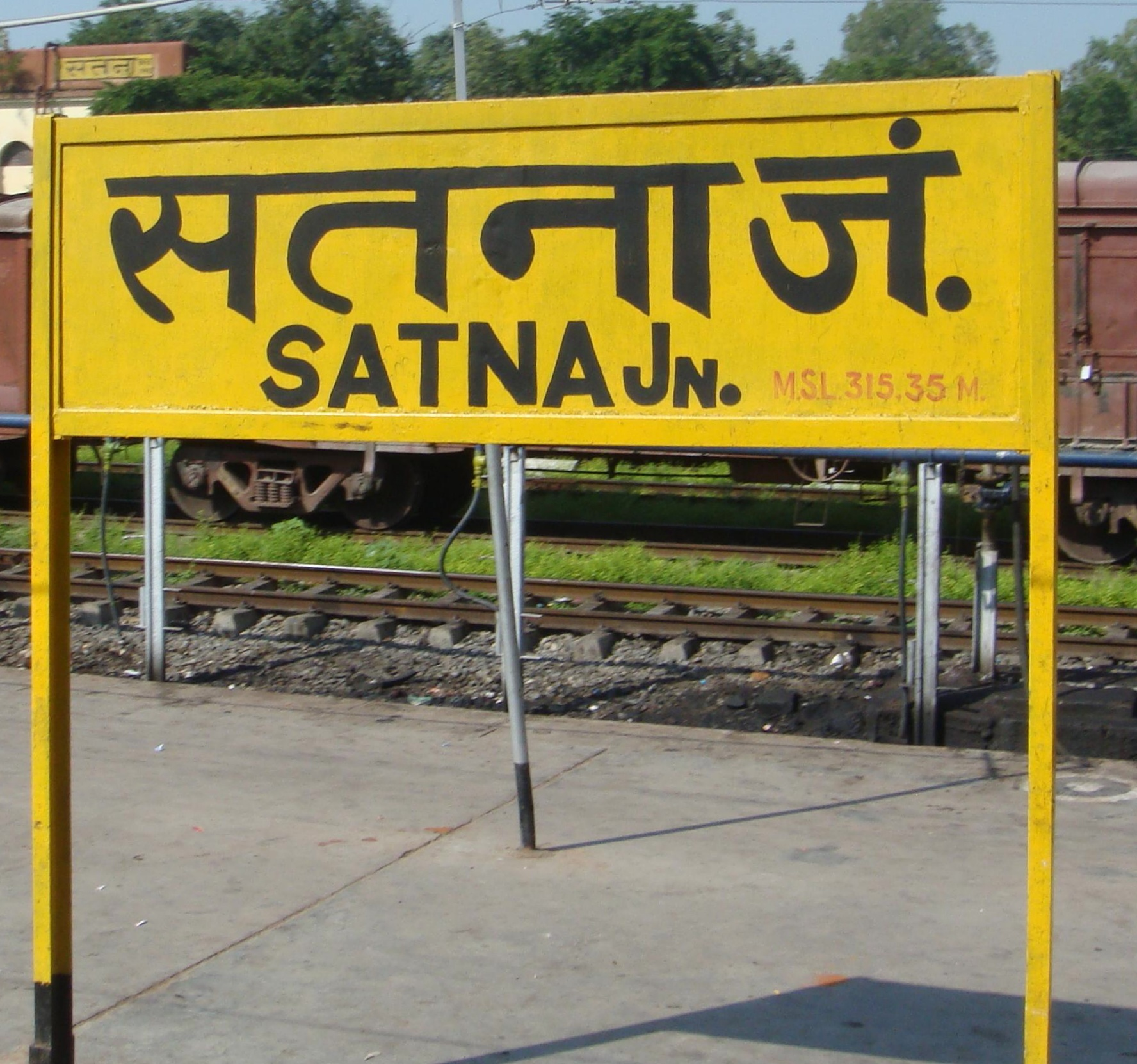
- Satna Junction board

General information
- Location: Satna, Satna district, Madhya Pradesh; India
- Coordinates: 24°33′59″N 80°49′43″E
- Elevation: 315.35 metres (1,034.6 ft)
- System: Indian Railways junction station
- Owner: Indian Railways
- Lines: Howrah–Prayagraj–Mumbai line, Satna-Rewa branch line, Prayagaraj–Jabalpur section
- Platforms: 3+12 under construction
- Tracks: 5

Other information
- Status: Functioning
- Station code: STA
- Zone(s): West Central Railway
- Division(s): Jabalpur
Location
- Location within Madhya Pradesh
- Interactive map

Satna Junction railway station (station code: STA) is the main railway station in Satna, a major city of Madhya Pradesh, India. It is located about one km from city centre. The station sees great usage, with more than 300 trains stopping here on a daily basis. There are mainly 3 platforms in Satna railway station.

Electrification of Satna Junction was completed in 2020. After electrification up to Satna, electric trains between Satna and Katni electric locomotives are used. Now both the way satna-manikpur and satna-katni has been electrified.

Trains serving this station include the Deekshabhoomi Express, Dhanbad - Coimbatore Amrit Bharat Express, Rewa–Anand Vihar Superfast Express, Rewanchal Express, Nagpur–Rewa Superfast Express, Rajkot–Rewa Superfast Express, Bilaspur–Rewa Express, Rewa–Dr. Ambedkar Nagar Express, Bhagmati Express, Sanghamithra Express, Ganga Kaveri Express, Mahanagari Express, Khwaja Garib Nawaz Madar–Kolkata Express, Bhagalpur–Khwaja Garib Nawaz Madar Express, Mahakoshal Express and many more.

== Picture gallery ==
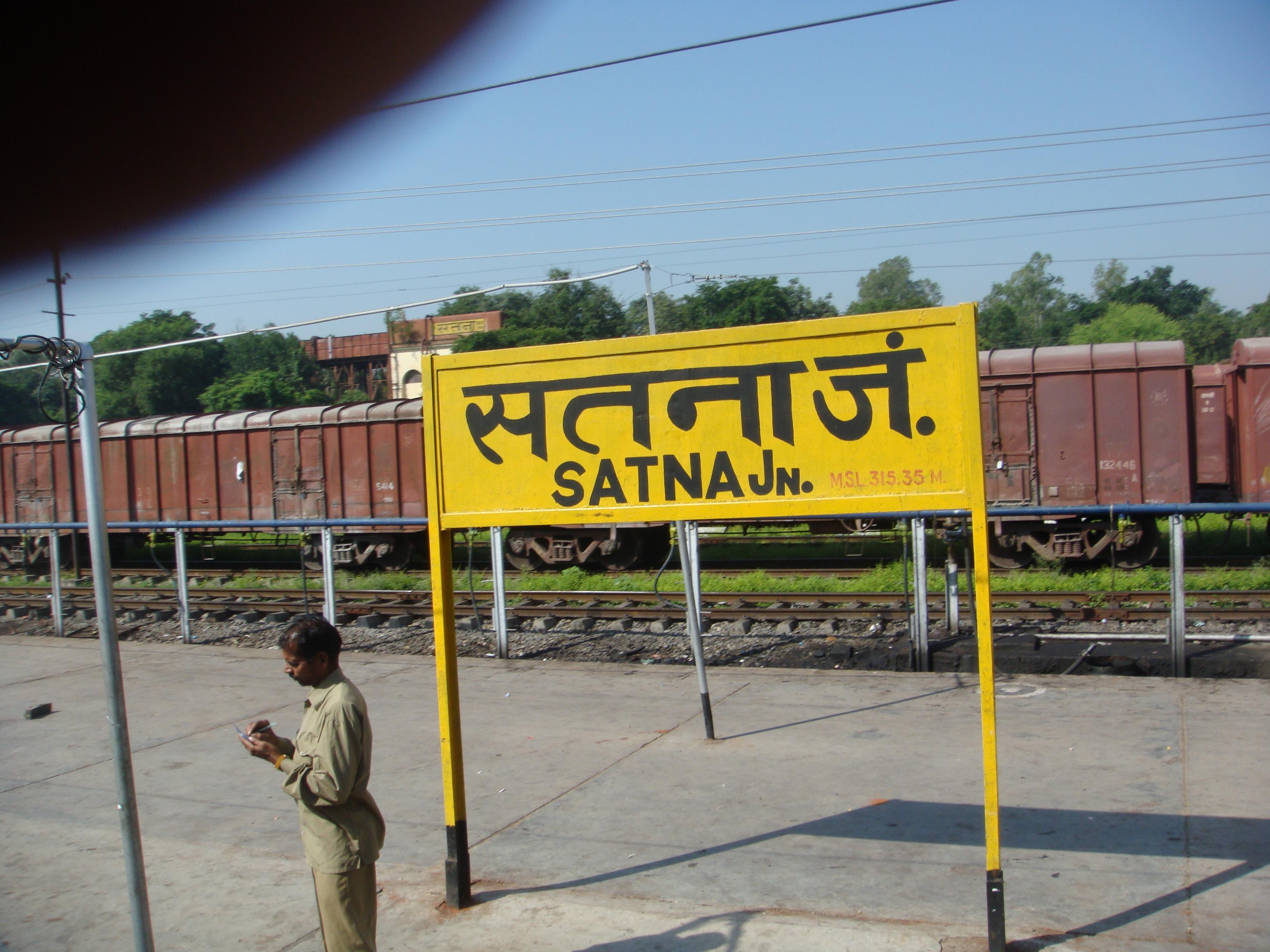
Satna Junction

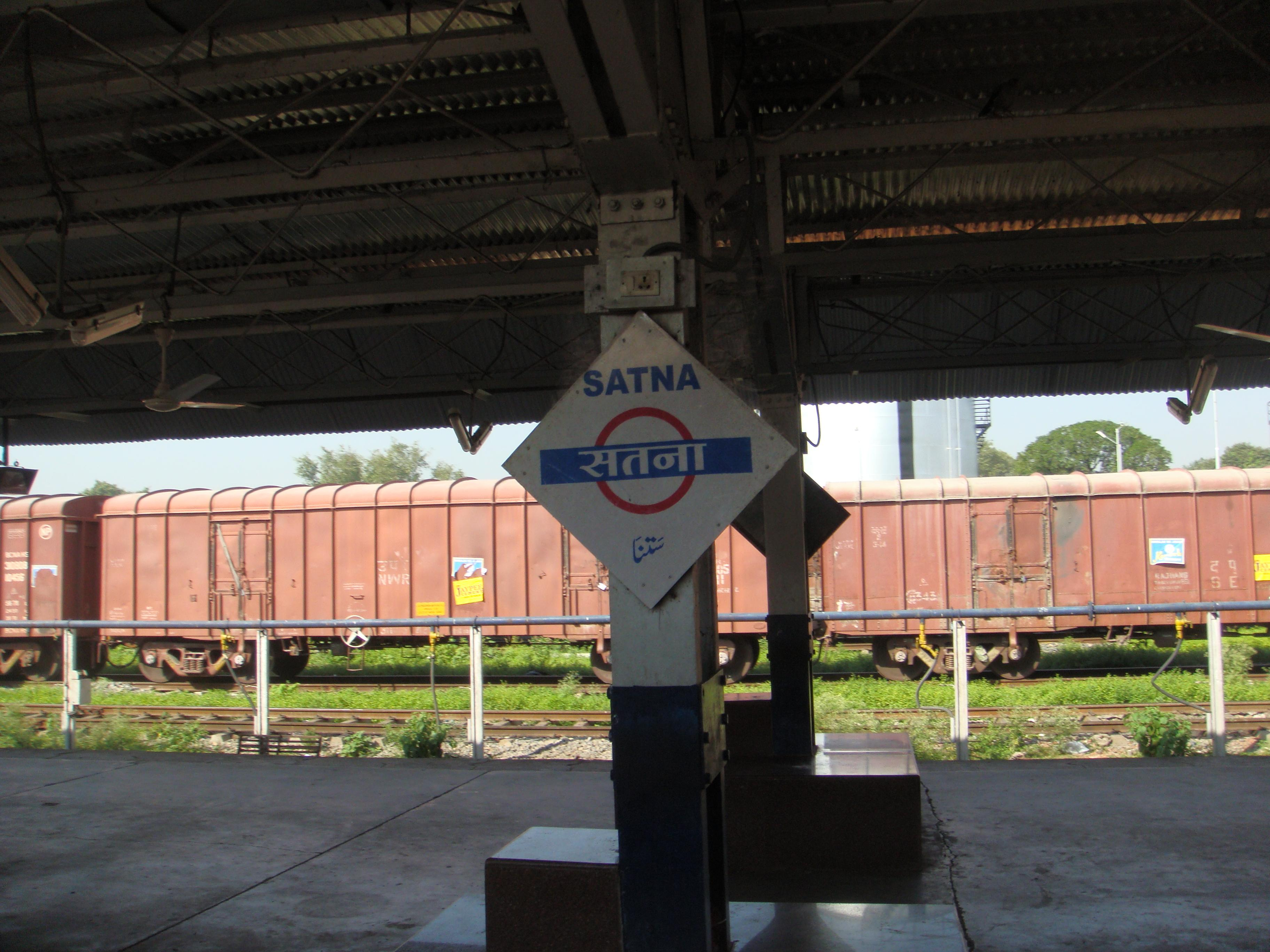
Satna Junction platform board

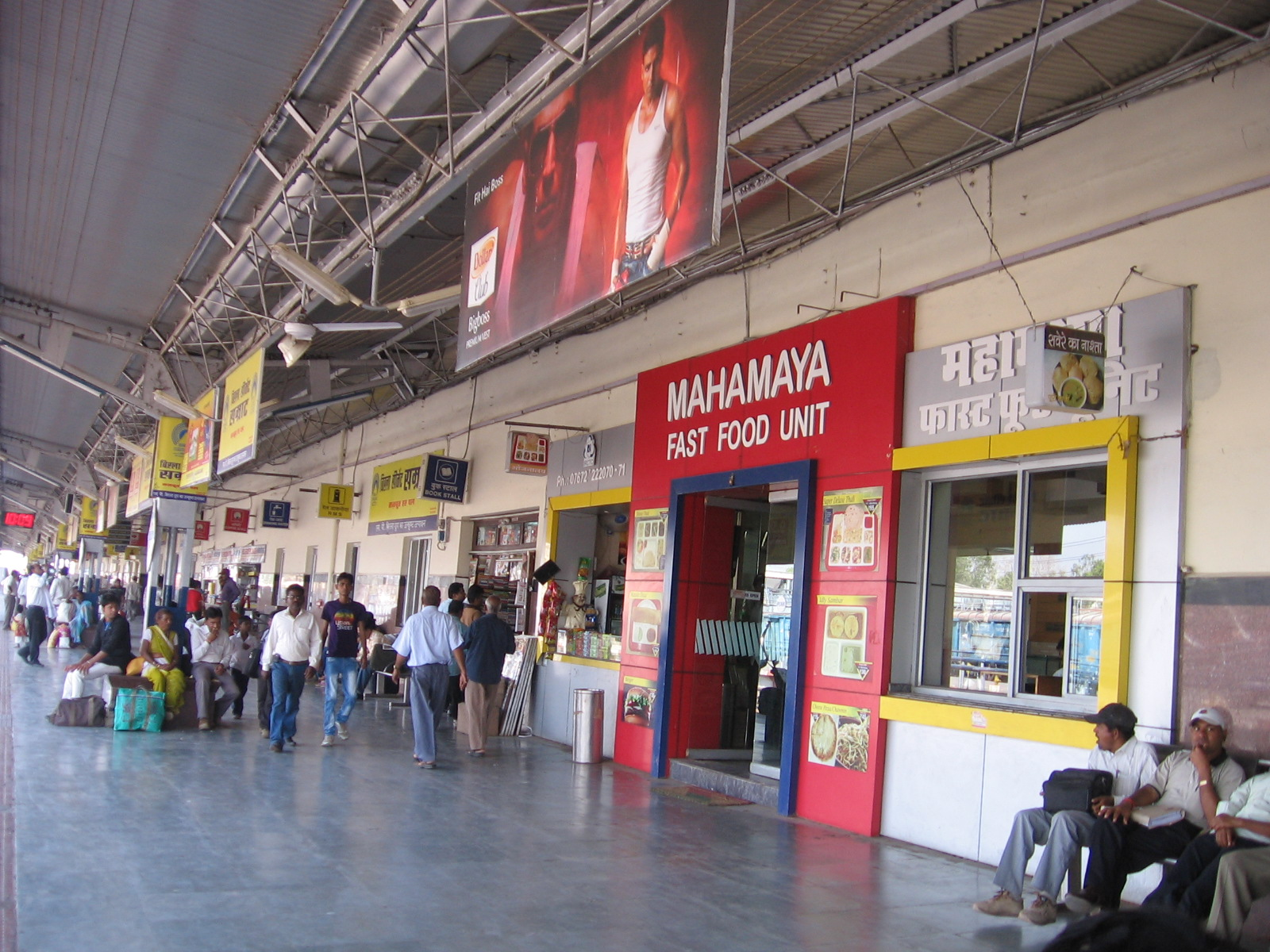
Satna railway station

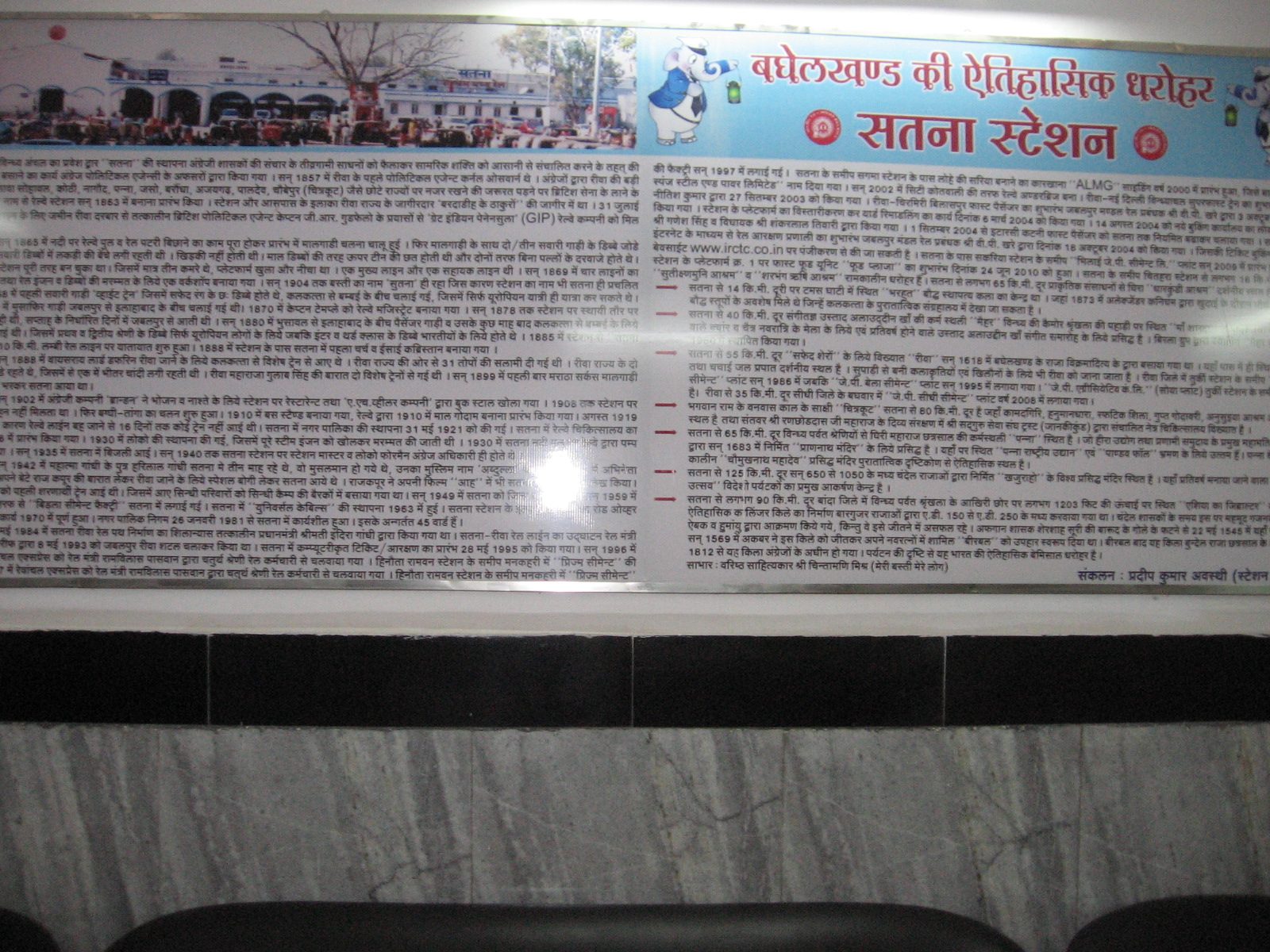
History of Satna Station
