= Jabalpur Junction railway station =

Major railway hub in Jabalpur, Madhya Pradesh, India

Jabalpur Junction जबलपुर जंक्शन
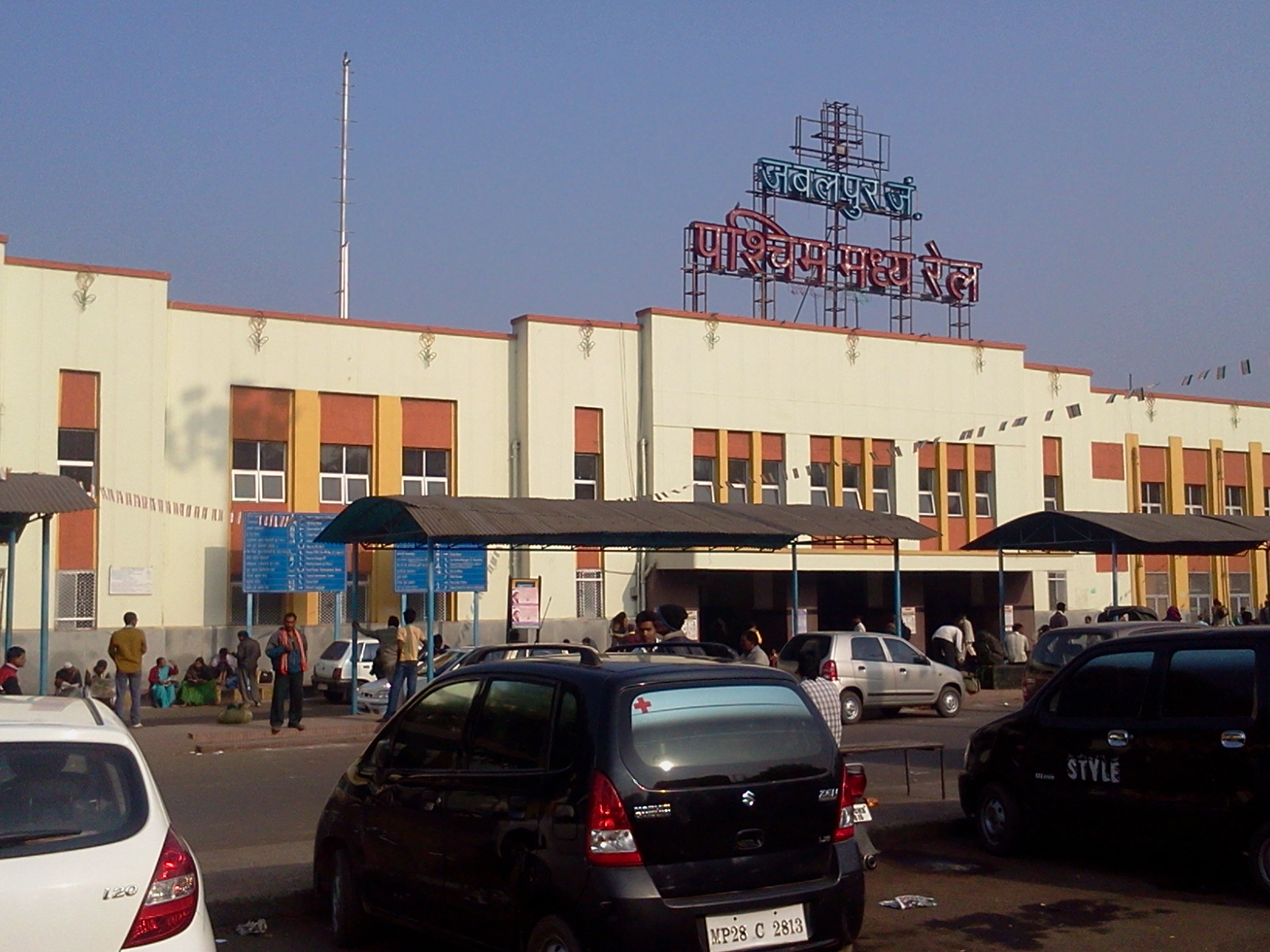
- Jabalpur Junction Railway Station

General information
- Location: Civil Lines, Jabalpur, Madhya Pradesh 482001; India
- Coordinates: 23°09′53″N 79°57′04″E
- Elevation: 410.870 metres (1,348.00 ft)
- System: Express and Passenger station
- Owner: Indian Railways
- Operator: West Central Railway
- Manager: Jabalpur Railway Division
- Lines: Howrah–Prayagraj–Mumbai line, Prayagraj–Jabalpur section, Jabalpur–Bhusaval section, Jabalpur–Gondia section, Jabalpur–Indore via Gadarwara
- Platforms: 7 (Expanding to 8 under ABSS)
- Tracks: 10
- Connections: Jabalpur Metro-bus, Taxi Stand, Integrated Parking

Construction
- Structure type: On Ground
- Parking: Multi-level (Proposed)
- Cycle facilities: Yes
- Accessible: Yes

Other information
- Status: Active
- Station code: JBP
- Fare zone: West Central Railway

History
- Opened: 1867
- Electrified: Yes (100% AC Traction)

Passengers
- ~125,000 daily (2026 est.)
Location
- Location within Madhya Pradesh
- Location within Madhya Pradesh

Jabalpur Junction railway station (Station Code: JBP) is a major Non-Suburban Grade-1 (NSG-1) railway junction serving Jabalpur City in the Indian state of Madhya Pradesh. It serves as the headquarters for both the West Central Railway (WCR) and the Jabalpur railway division. Located on the primary Mumbai–Prayagraj–Howrah rail axis, it is one of the busiest transit hubs in Central India.

As of 2026, the station is undergoing a major world-class redevelopment under the Amrit Bharat Station Scheme at an estimated cost of ₹460 crore.

== History ==
Railway connectivity to Jabalpur began in 1867 with the opening of the Naini–Jabalpur line of the East Indian Railway. The station was officially inaugurated in 1870 by the then-Viceroy, Lord Mayo. Following the completion of the Howrah–Allahabad–Mumbai line, Jabalpur became a critical link between the northern, eastern, and western parts of India. In 2003, it became the headquarters of the newly formed West Central Railway zone.

== Infrastructure and redevelopment ==
Jabalpur Junction is an ISO 14001:2015 certified station. Under the Amrit Bharat Station Scheme (active 2026), the station is being redesigned to mirror the aesthetics of the Rani Kamalapati railway station in Bhopal.

- Expansion: The station is increasing its platform count to 8 to accommodate the surge in traffic from the Jabalpur–Gondia doubling project.
- Roof Plaza: A 40,000 sq. ft. roof plaza is under construction, featuring premium waiting lounges, retail spaces, and multi-cuisine food courts.
- Modern Amenities: The upgrade includes 24 new escalators, 30 lifts, and a unified digital information system.
- Solar Integration: The station utilizes solar power for roughly 25% of its daily energy requirements as part of WCR's green energy initiative.

== Connectivity ==
The station provides high-speed connectivity to all major Indian cities. It is a primary terminal for several Vande Bharat Express services, including routes to Indore, Rewa, and Bhopal.

- Distance to Dumna Airport: 15 km
- Distance to Madan Mahal Railway Station: 3.7 km
- Distance to ISBT Jabalpur: 5 km

== See also ==
- Madan Mahal railway station
- West Central Railway zone
- Jabalpur railway division
