= Maihar railway station =

Railway station in satna, Madhya Pradesh, India

satna

General information
- Location: satna, Madhya Pradesh; India
- Coordinates: 24°15′24″N 80°45′50″E
- Elevation: 353 metres (1,158 ft)
- System: Indian Railway Station
- Owner: Ministry of Railways, Indian Railways
- Operator: government of india
- Line: Allahabad–Jabalpur section
- Platforms: 3
- Tracks: 3

Construction
- Structure type: Standard (On Ground)
- Parking: Yes

Other information
- Status: Functioning
- Station code: MYR
- Zone(s): West Central Railway
- Division(s): Jabalpur

History
- Opened: since 1871
- Electrified: yes during covid-19 2020
Location
- Location within India Location within Madhya Pradesh

Maihar railway station is a railway station serving Maihar town, in Satna district of Madhya Pradesh state of India. Maihar is A category station of West Central Railway Zone of Indian Railways.

== Administration ==
It is under Jabalpur railway division of West Central Railway Zone of Indian Railways.

== Line ==
It is located on Katni – Satna main line of the Indian Railways.

== Structure ==
It is located at 353 m above sea level and has three platforms.

== Development ==
As of 2016, electrified of existing double Broad Gauge railway line is in progress and at this station, 81 trains stops. Khajuraho Airport, is at distance of 111 kilo meters.

== See also ==
- Satna district
- Maihar district
