= Itarsi Junction railway station =

Railway station in Madhya Pradesh, India

Itarsi Junction
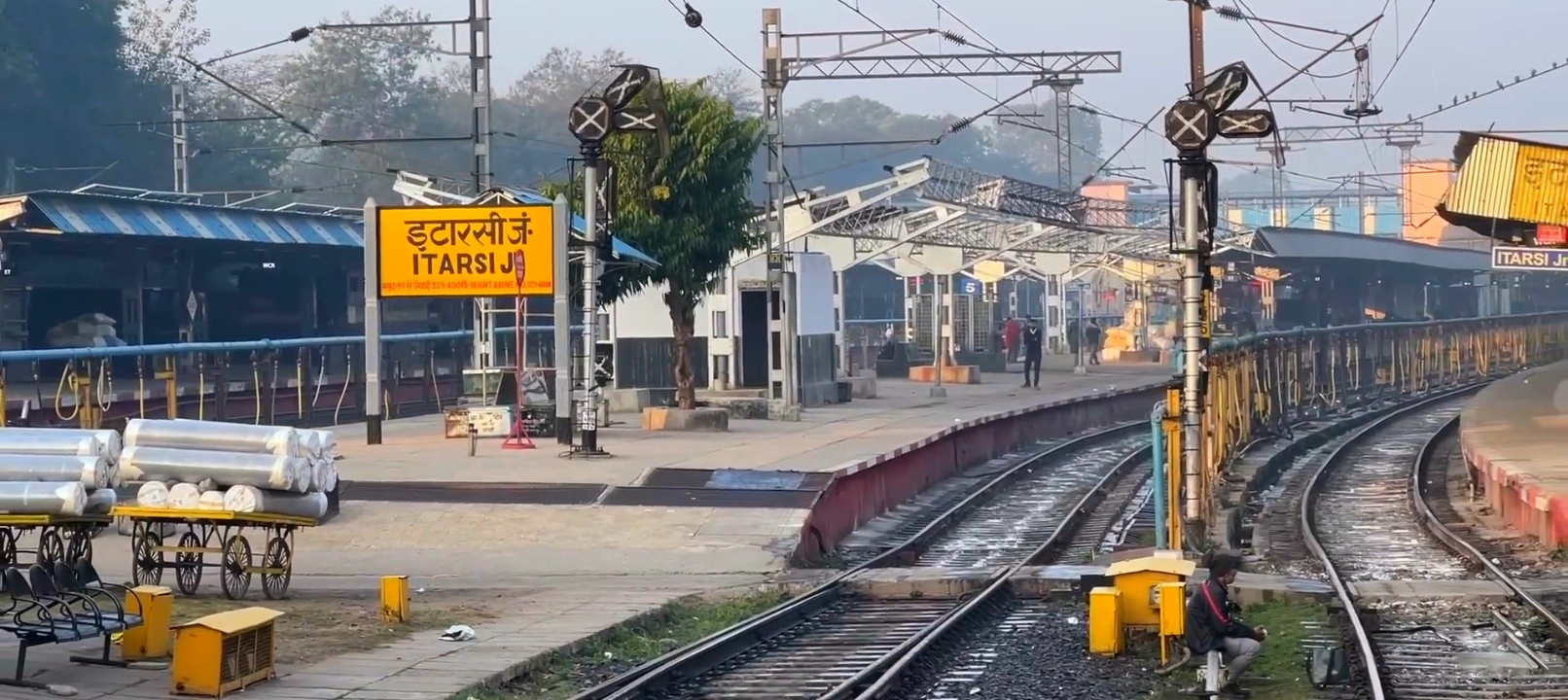
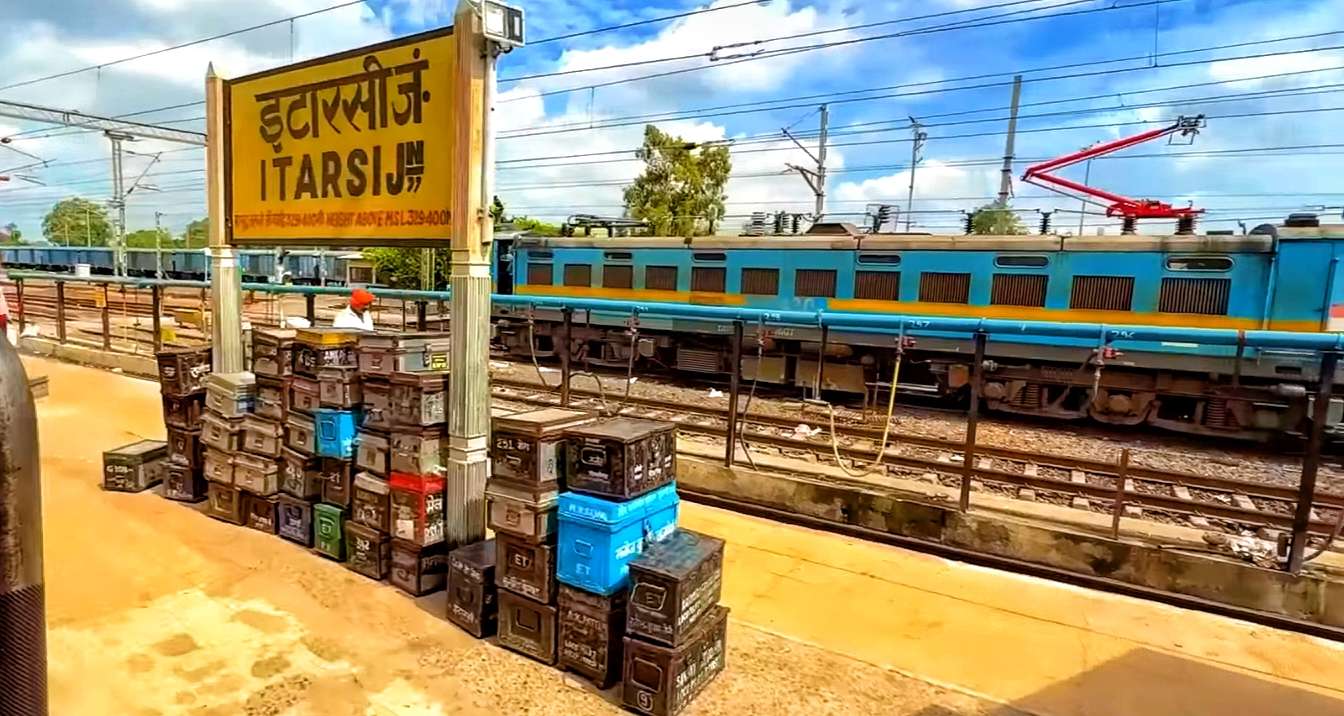
- Itarsi Junction railway station

General information
- Location: Foot Over Bridge, Venkatesh Colony, Itarsi, Hoshangabad district, Madhya Pradesh; India
- Coordinates: 22°36′29″N 77°46′01″E
- Elevation: 329.400 metres (1,080.71 ft)
- System: Regional rail, Light rail & Commuter rail
- Owner: Indian Railways
- Operator: West Central Railways
- Lines: New Delhi–Chennai main line, Howrah–Prayagraj–Mumbai line
- Platforms: 7
- Tracks: 11

Other information
- Status: Functioning
- Station code: ET
- Zone(s): West Central Railway zone
- Division(s): Bhopal
Route map
- Delhi-Chennai line Howrah-Allahabad-Mumbai line
Location
- Location within Madhya Pradesh Location within India

Itarsi Junction railway station (station code: ET) is a junction railway station in Hoshangabad district in Madhya Pradesh from which more than 550 trains pass every day. It is the 8th busiest railway junction in India. It falls under the West Central Railway zone of Indian Railways network. It is located 18 kilometres (11 mi) away from Hoshangabad by train, and by road it is 20 kilometers. It is one of the most important junction stations, behind Pandit Deen Dayal Upadhyaya Junction and Nagpur Junction. In 2015 the signal control system was gutted in a fire incident resulting in hundreds of trains being cancelled for over 30 days till normality was restored.

== Gallery ==
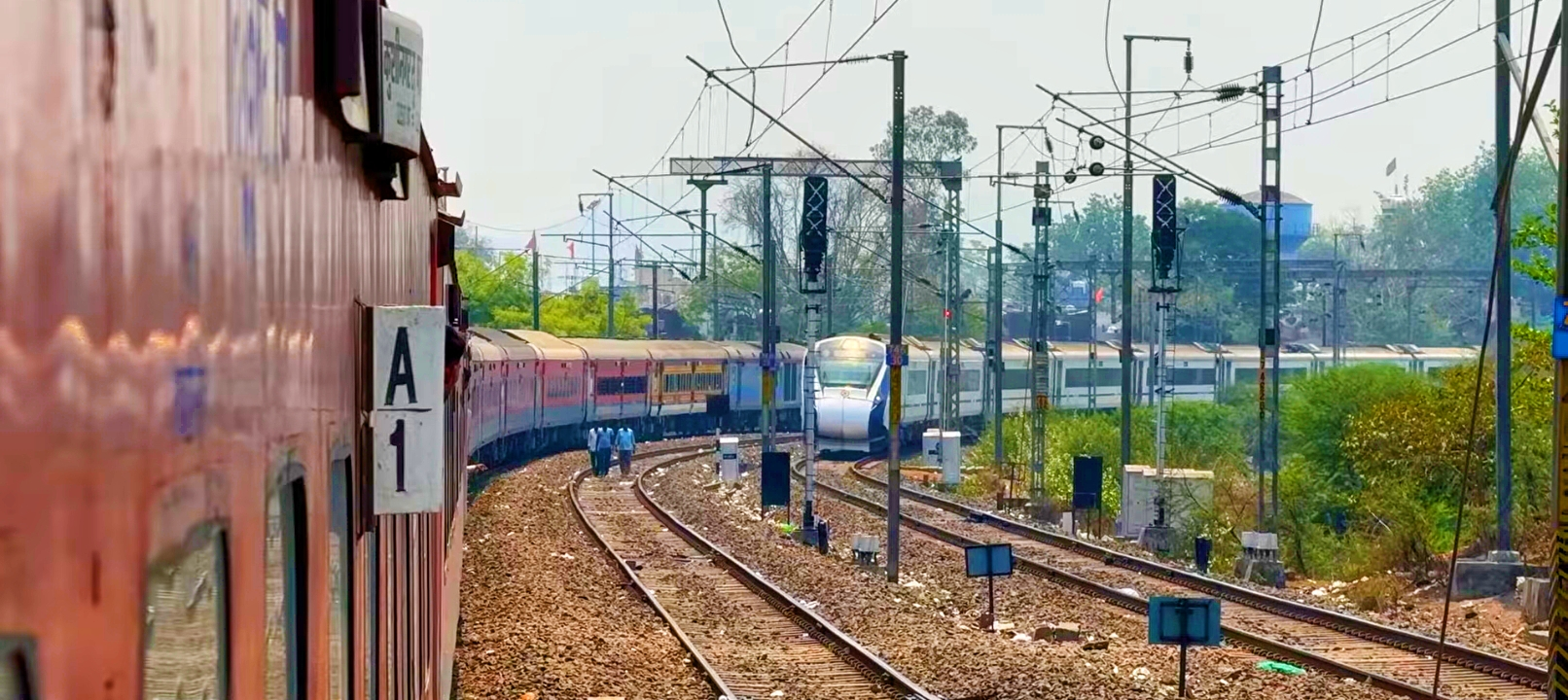
Itarsi Junction Outer

== Structure and location ==
The railway station of Itarsi consists of seven platforms. The platforms are well furnished to meet all passenger needs and demands.

== Connectivity ==
Itarsi Junction railway station is well connected with rail routes from all four directions, connecting it to destinations across India .

Status of arrival and departure of trains at Itarsi junction can be viewed via live station through National Train Enquiry System.

== Lines ==
The tracks on the junction are such that they provide a vast connection to all four directions. To the north lies the important capital city of Madhya Pradesh, Bhopal and the line goes all the way to New Delhi. To the east lies another important railway junction Jabalpur where the line goes all the way to Prayagraj and Howrah. To the southwest lies Khandwa and Bhusawal where the line terminates at Mumbai CSMT, and to the southeast lies Amla Junction, Betul and Nagpur which goes all the way to Chennai Central. The station always holds heavy over-traffic as the trains on the Howrah–Prayagraj–Mumbai line and Jhansi–Bhopal–Nagpur routes cross at Itarsi.

=== Trains originating from and terminating at Itarsi ===
- Vindhyachal Express
- Itarsi Prayagraj Chhioki Express
- Itarsi Katni MEMU
- Itarsi Amla MEMU
- Itarsi Bhusawal MEMU Express

== Loco sheds ==
Electric Loco Shed, Itarsi and Diesel Loco Shed, Itarsi are the two loco sheds serving Itarsi Junction.

Diesel Loco Shed, Itarsi
Serial No.	Locomotive Class	Horsepower	Quantity
1.	WDM-3A	3100	11
2.	WDM-3D	3300	30
3.	WDG-4/4D	4000/4500	58
4.	WDP-4/4B/4D	4000/4500	4
5.	WAG-5	3850	106
Total Locomotives Active as of April 2026			209

== 2015 Fire incident ==
On 17 June 2015, there was a fire incident on Itarsi Junction involving signal control system resulting in extensive damage to route relay interlocking system (RRI). This resulted in trains being stranded at the station other trains heading towards station being cancelled or diverted. Initially the extent of damage was considered small, but subsequent inspection post fire control found RRI in ashes, beyond repair. A deadline was set to commission new RRI in 35 days. 78 trains were cancelled and 23 diverted by second day alone. Thirty four days disruption resulted in cancellation of 2,044 trains, diversion of 249 trains and short termination of 17 trains. The new RRI installation was completed on 21 July at a cost of Rs. 19.64 cr. Complete normalcy was restored by 26 July 2015.

== See also ==
- Bhopal Junction
- Katni Junction
- Narmadapuram
- Ghoradongri
- Rani Kamalapati
