= Dabhoi Junction railway station =

Railway station in Gujarat, India

Dabhoi Junction

General information
- Location: Kajiwad Masjid Road, Dabhoi, Vadodara district, Gujarat; India
- Coordinates: 22.1377°N 73.4159°E
- Elevation: 43 metres (141 ft)
- System: Indian Railways station
- Owner: Indian Railways
- Operator: Western Railway
- Lines: Vadodara-Alirajpur-Dhar line, Dabhoi-Miyagam Karjan line, Pratapnagar (Vadodara)-Dabhoi-Ekta Nagar line
- Platforms: 3
- Tracks: 4

Construction
- Structure type: Standard on ground
- Parking: Yes
- Cycle facilities: Yes
- Accessible: Available

Other information
- Status: Functional
- Station code: DB
- Zone(s): Western Railway zone
- Division(s): Vadodara

History
- Opened: 1862; 164 years ago
- Rebuilt: 2020; 6 years ago
Location
- Location within Gujarat Location within India

Dabhoi Junction railway station (station code:- DB) is the main junction railway station in the Indian city of Dabhoi in Vadodara district, Gujarat, India. It falls under Western Railway's Vadodara railway division.

== History ==
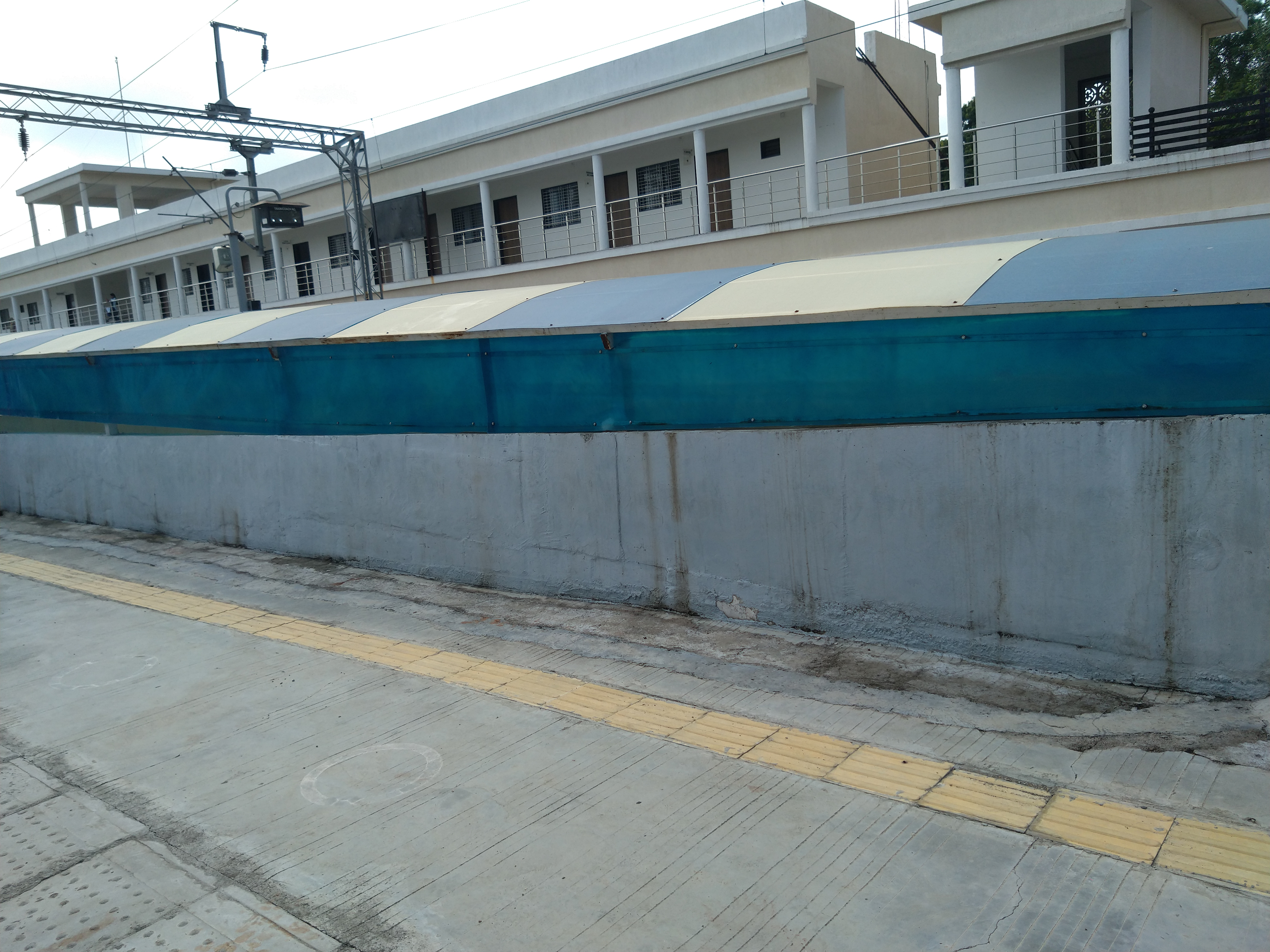
station platform

Dabhoi Junction railway station is at a distance of about 36 km from Vadodara. The station is about 161 years old and was once the largest narrow-gauge railway station in Asia. Although few narrow-gauge lines remain in India, because most have been converted to broad gauge, this is one of the remaining unchanged lines. Steam-powered trains for Miyagam Karjan, Chandod, Vadodara operate here.

The station was rebuilt in 2020. A new structure with three tracks and a modern underground platform has been built.

== Trains ==
- 12927/12928 Ekta Nagar - Dadar Western Superfast Express
- 20903/20904 Ekta Nagar - Varanasi Mahamana Express
- 20905/20906 Ekta Nagar - Rewa Mahamana Express
- 20919/20920 Ekta Nagar - MGR Chennai Central Superfast Express
- 20945/20946 Ekta Nagar - Hazrat Nizamuddin Gujarat Sampark Kranti Express
- 20947/20948 Ekta Nagar–Ahmedabad Jan Shatabdi Express
- 20949/20950 Ekta Nagar–Ahmedabad Jan Shatabdi Express
- 69201/69202 Ekta Nagar–Pratapnagar MEMU
- 69203/69204 Ekta Nagar–Pratapnagar MEMU
- 69205/69206 Ekta Nagar–Pratapnagar MEMU
- 59117/18/19 Pratapnagar–Chhota Udaipur-Jobat Passenger
- 59121/22 Pratapnagar–Alirajpur Passenger
- 79455/56 Vadodara–Chhota Udaipur DEMU
- 79461/62 Pratapnagar - Dabhoi - Miyagam Karjan DEMU

== Electrification ==
The Pratapnagar–Dabhoi–Chhotaudepur line is now fully electrified. And Miyagam Karjan-Dabhoi gauge conversation + electrification works are done as in February 2023.

Now the Pratapnagar–Dabhoi–Ektanagar (Kevadiya) line has been electrified. This new line was inaugurated on 17 January 2021.

Chhotaudepur–Alirajpur–Dhar new line + electrification work is in progress. It is expected to be completed in end-2026.

== Electric Loco Workshop, Dabhoi ==
The Electric Locomotive Workshop in Dabhoi, Gujarat, is a modern facility under the Western Railway zone, primarily dedicated to the Periodic Overhaul (POH) of electric locomotives. It marks a significant transformation of Dabhoi's identity from a world-renowned narrow-gauge hub to a key player in India's broad-gauge electric rail network.

The workshop was developed as a turnkey project by Rail Vikas Nigam Limited (RVNL) at a cost of approximately ₹184.31 crore. It was specifically designed to handle the maintenance and heavy repair (POH) of electric locomotives as part of the Indian Railways' mission for 100% electrification.

== See also ==
- Vadodara Junction railway station
- Pratapnagar railway station
- Chhota Udaipur railway station
- Bodeli railway station
- Ekta Nagar railway station
