= Ekta =

Ekta may refer to:

== People ==
- Ekta Bhyan (born 1985), Indian para athlete
- Ekta Bisht, Indian cricketer
- Ekta Chowdhry, Indian model
- Ekta Kapoor (born 1975), Indian television producer
- Ekta Kaul (born 1990), Indian actress
- Ekta Khosla, Indian model
- Ekta Sohini, Indian actress

== Arts and entertainment ==
- Ekta (film), Indian film
- Ekta Jeev Sadashiv, Indian film
- Amra Ekta Cinema Banabo, Bangladeshi film
- Ekta Chilo Sonar Konya, song

== Politics ==
- Ekta Yatra, political rallies in India
- Ekta Shakti, political party in India
- Punjab Ekta Party, political party in India
- Quami Ekta Dal, political party in India
- Rastrabadi Ekta Party, political party in Nepal
- Samajik Ekta Party, political party in India
- Ekta Manch, political alliance in India

== Trains ==
- Ekta Nagar–Hazrat Nizamuddin Gujarat Sampark Kranti Express, train in India
- Ekta Nagar–Rewa Mahamana Express, train in India
- Ekta Nagar–Varanasi Mahamana Express, train in India
- Bhiwani–Kalka Ekta Express, train in India

== Other uses ==
- EKTA, Ukrainian developer and manufacturer of LED video screens
- Ekta Space, color spaces
