= Indore–Bikaner Mahamana Express =

Train in India

Indore - Bikaner Mahamana Express

Overview
- Service type: Mahamana Express
- First service: January 26, 2019; 7 years ago
- Current operator: Western Railway

Route
- Termini: Indore Junction (INDB); Bikaner Junction (BKN)
- Stops: 17
- Distance travelled: 962 km (598 mi)
- Average journey time: 19 hrs 30 mins
- Service frequency: Weekly (Note: Runs one day in a week for every direction.)
- Train number: 19333 / 19334

On-board services
- Classes: AC 2 tier, AC 3 tier, Sleeper Class, General Unreserved
- Seating arrangements: Yes
- Sleeping arrangements: Yes
- Catering facilities: On-board Catering; E-Catering
- Baggage facilities: No
- Other facilities: Below the seats

Technical
- Rolling stock: LHB coach
- Track gauge: 1,676 mm (5 ft 6 in)
- Operating speed: 50 km/h (31 mph), including halts
Route map
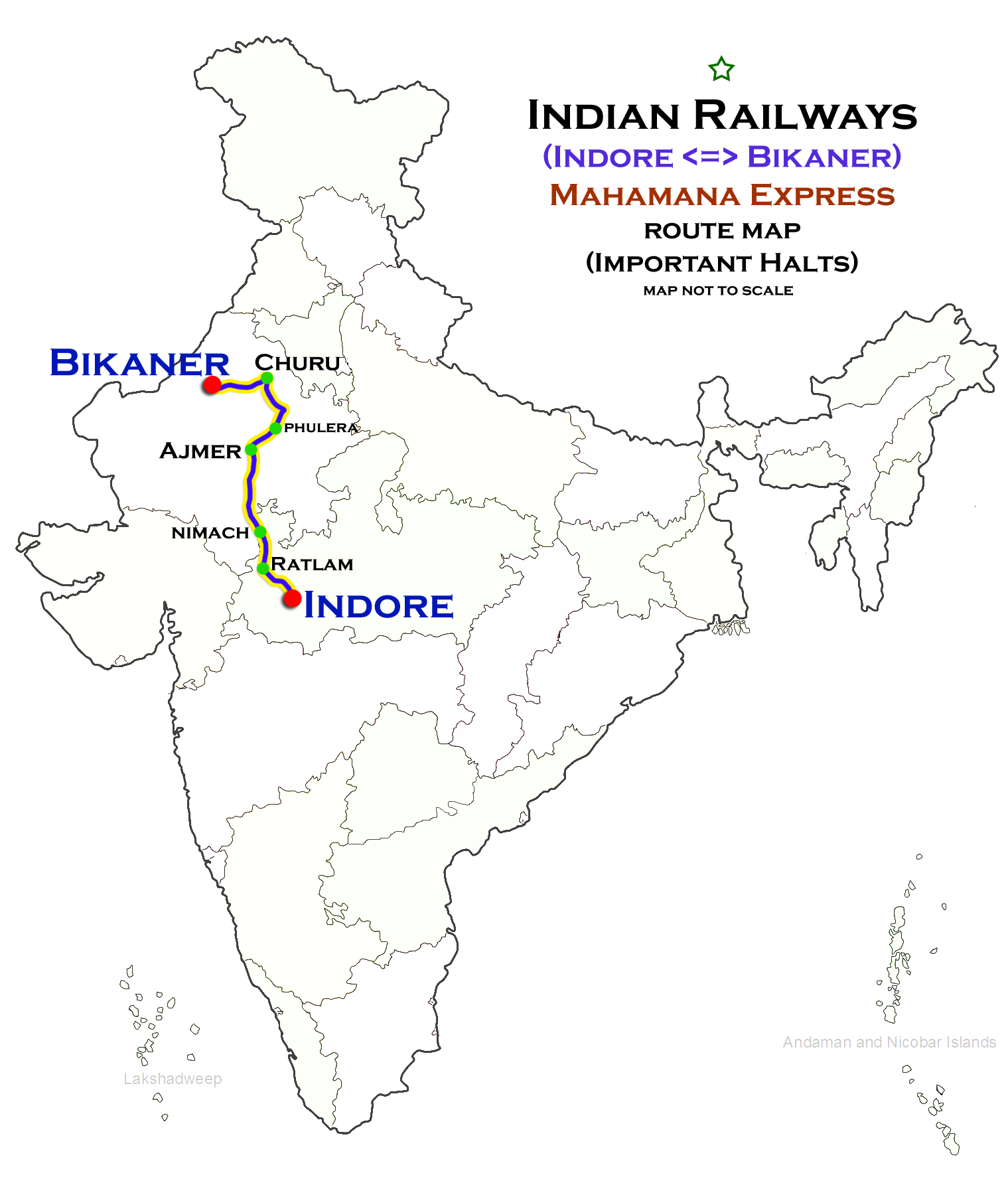

The 19333 / 19334 Indore - Bikaner Mahamana Express is an express train belonging to Western Railway zone that runs between Indore Junction and Bikaner Junction in India.

It is currently being operated with 19333/19334 train numbers on a weekly basis.

== Coach composition ==
The train has standard ICF rakes with a maximum speed of 110 kmph. The train consists of 16 coaches :

- 1 AC II Tier
- 2 AC III Tier
- 7 Sleeper Coaches
- 4 General Unreserved
- 2 Seating cum Luggage Rake

== Service ==
The 19333/Indore - Bikaner Mahamana Express has an average speed of 50 km/h and covers 962 km in 19h 15m.

The 19334/Bikaner - Indore Mahamana Express has an average speed of 48 km/h and covers 962 km in 20h 10m.

== Route and halts ==
The 19333/19334 Indore - Bikaner Mahamana Express runs from Indore Junction via Fatehabad Chandrawatiganj Junction, Badnagar, Ratlam Junction, Chittaurgarh Junction, Ajmer Junction, Phulera Junction, Ringas Junction, Sikar Junction, Churu Junction Ratangarh Junction to Bikaner Junction.

== Schedule ==
Train Number	Station Code	Departure Station	Departure Time	Departure Day	Arrival Station	Arrival Time	Arrival Day
19333	INDB	Indore Junction	14:10 PM	Sat	Bikaner Junction	09:25 AM	Sun
19334	BKN	Bikaner Junction	13:25 PM	Sun	Indore Junction	09:35 AM	Mon

== Rake sharing ==
The train shares its rake with 19319/19320 Veraval - Indore Mahamana Express.

== Traction ==
It is hauled by a Ratlam based diesel locomotive WDM 3A on its entire journey. And they could pull by a WAP-5 and WAP-7

== See also ==
- Bikaner Junction railway station
- Indore Junction railway station
- Mahamana Express
- Bhopal - Khajuraho Mahamana Superfast Express
- Varanasi - New Delhi Mahamana Express
- Vadodara - Varanasi Mahamana Express
