= Ekta Nagar railway station =

Railway station in Gujarat, India

Ekta Nagar (Kevadia) Kevadia
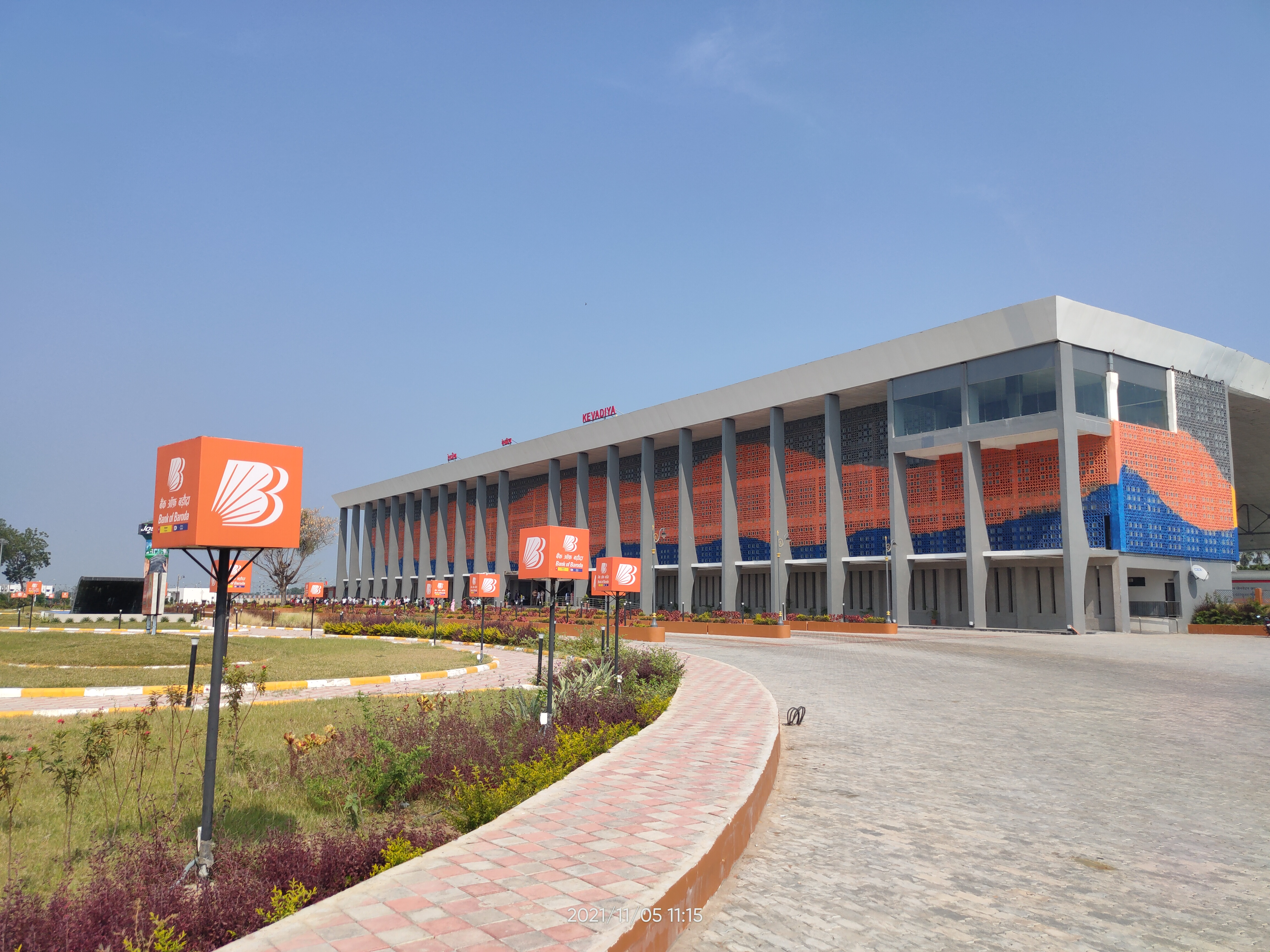
- Entrence view of Ekta Nagar railway station.

General information
- Location: Opp. Sardar Sarovar resort, near Ekta Dwar, Kevadia, Narmada district, Gujarat; India
- Coordinates: 21.8875°N 73.6888°E
- Elevation: 63.01 metres (206.7 ft)
- System: Indian Railways station
- Owner: Indian Railways
- Operator: Western Railways
- Line: Dabhoi–Ekta Nagar line
- Platforms: 3
- Tracks: 4

Construction
- Structure type: Standard on ground
- Parking: Yes
- Cycle facilities: Yes
- Accessible: Available

Other information
- Status: Functioning
- Station code: EKNR
- Zone(s): Western Railway zone
- Division(s): Vadodara

History
- Opened: 17 January 2021; 5 years ago
Location
- Location within Gujarat Location within India

Ekta Nagar railway station (station code: EKNR), formerly (Kevadia railway station) is located in Kevadia, Narmada district, Gujarat, India. It consists of 3 platforms.

== Location ==
Facing the Narmada river, it is 7 kilometers away from the small town of Kevadiya. The construction of the station aims to make the Statue of Unity more accessible to tourists. Ekta Nagar railway station is located at a distance of just 5 kilometres from Statue of Unity.

== Development ==
The President of India, Ram Nath Kovind had laid the foundation stone on 15 December 2018. It is also India's first railway station with a Green Building Certificate.

The construction of the railway station is set to cost 200 million Indian rupees. The railway line will connect Kevadiya to Chandod, Moriya, Tilakwada and Garudeshwar. The existing Narrow Gauge railway line between Chandod and Dabhoi has been converted to broad gauge. Another 32 km (20 mi) stretch is being laid between Chandod and Kevadiya. The station building has three levels. The first two levels contain facilities for passengers and the third floor is an art gallery. It was inaugurated on 17 January 2021.

== Facilities ==
It has a 24-hour cloakroom, air-conditioned retiring rooms, waiting rooms for ladies as well as general and upper-class passengers, and a food stall. A bus service is available for passengers holding valid entry or viewing tickets to the Statue of Unity.

== Trains ==
- 12927/12928 Ekta Nagar–Dadar Western Superfast Express
- 20903/20904 Ekta Nagar–Varanasi Mahamana Express
- 20905/20906 Ekta Nagar–Rewa Mahamana Express
- 20919/20920 Ekta Nagar–Chennai Central Superfast Express
- 20945/20946 Ekta Nagar–Hazrat Nizamuddin SF Express.
- There is one special train - 09409/09410 Ahmedabad Jn (ADI) - Ekta Nagar (EKNR) Steam Heritage Special. Inaugurated on 30 October 2023. Runs every Saturday and Sunday. 182 km. 1 stop, Vadodara Jn (BRC). Although locomotive looks like steam engine, it's an electric locomotive.
- 20947/20948 Ekta Nagar–Ahmedabad Jan Shatabdi Express
- 20949/20950 Ekta Nagar–Ahmedabad Jan Shatabdi Express
- 69201/69202 Ekta Nagar–Pratapnagar MEMU
- 69203/69204 Ekta Nagar–Pratapnagar MEMU
- 69205/69206 Ekta Nagar–Pratapnagar MEMU

== See also ==
- Vadodara Junction railway station
- Dabhoi Junction railway station
- Pratapnagar railway station
