= Alirajpur railway station =

Railway station in Madhya Pradesh, India

Alirajpur Railway Station

General information
- Location: Saija, Alirajpur, Madhya Pradesh; India
- Coordinates: 22.2998°N 74.3981°E
- Elevation: 278 metres (912 ft)
- System: Indian Railways station
- Line: Chhota Udaipur–Dhar line
- Platforms: 3
- Tracks: 4

Construction
- Structure type: Standard on ground (Elevated platforms)
- Parking: Yes
- Cycle facilities: Yes
- Accessible: Available

Other information
- Status: Functional
- Station code: ARPR
- Zone(s): Western Railway zone
- Division(s): Vadodara

History
- Opened: 2019; 7 years ago
Location
- Location within Madhya Pradesh Location within India

Alirajpur railway station (station code: ARPR) is the main railway station in the Indian city of Alirajpur, Madhya Pradesh, India. It opened in 2019.

== Arrivals ==
These trains arrive at the station.

Number	Train	To	Type
59121	Pratapnagar–Alirajpur Passenger	Alirajpur	Local

== Departures ==
These trains depart from the station.

Number	Train	To	Type
59122	Alirajpur-Pratapnagar Passenger	Pratapnagar	Local

== See also ==
- Chhota Udaipur railway station
- Bodeli railway station
- Pratapnagar railway station
- Vadodara railway station
- Vadodara railway division
