= James Forbes (artist) =

British artist and writer

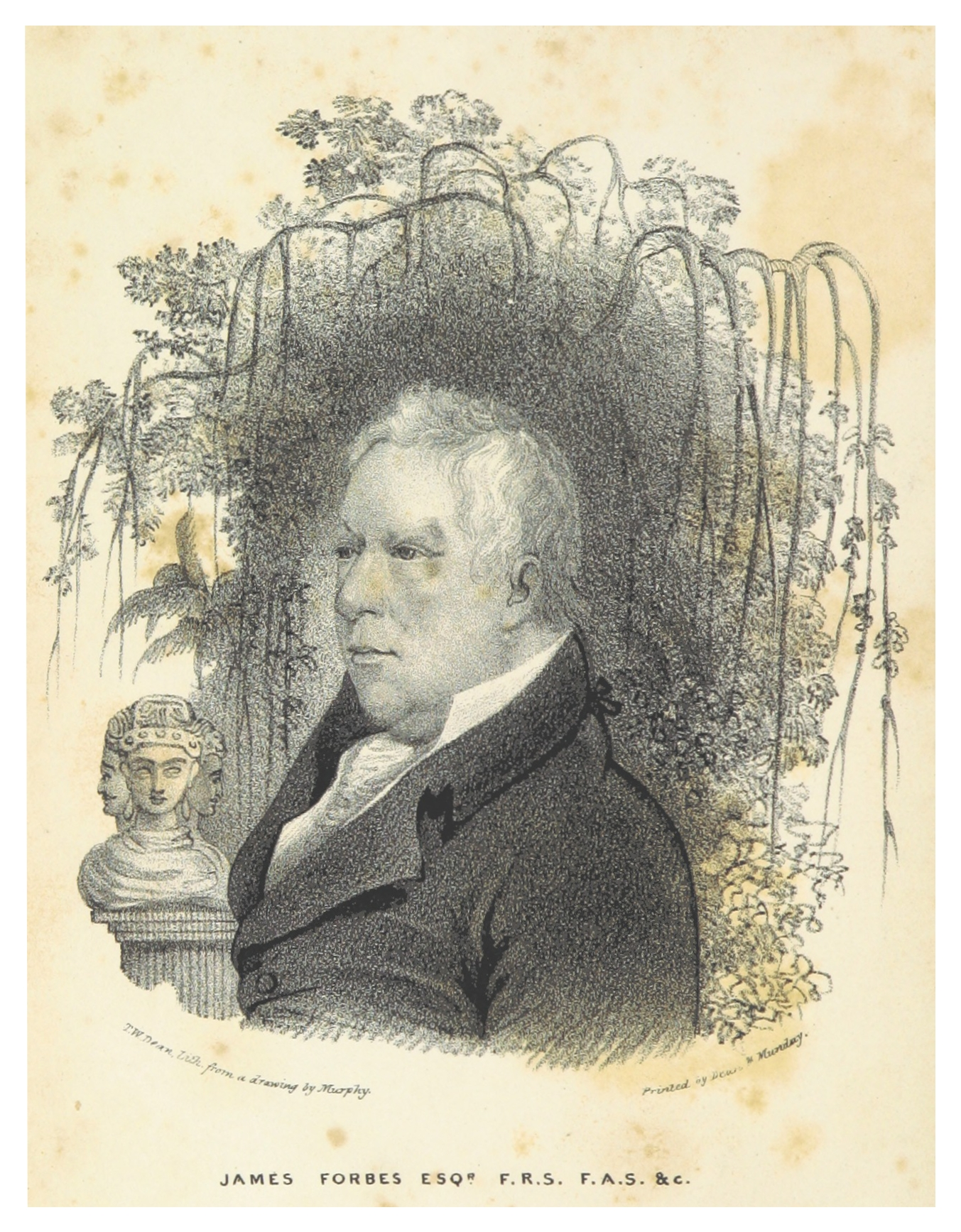
James Forbes, from his Oriental Memoirs

James Forbes (1749–1819) was a British artist and writer.

Born in London to a Scots family, Forbes travelled to India in 1765 as a writer for the British East India Company and was resident there until 1784. He was a prolific writer and artist and filled 52,000 manuscript pages with notes and sketches concerning all aspects of Indian life, its wildlife, flora and architecture. In 1781 he visited the Taj Mahal and became one of the first Europeans to draw it.

After returning to England he married and toured continental Europe extensively, including a grand tour in 1796 and 1797 of Germany, Switzerland, and Italy. He eventually returned to England to write Oriental Memoirs. Largely based on his notes and sketches, it was subtitled selected and abridged from a series of familiar letters written during seventeen years residence in India: including observations on parts of Africa and South America, and a narrative of occurrences in four India voyages was published in volumes beginning in 1813. The book remains a valued record of the culture, flora and fauna of India at the time.

Forbes also published a work in 1810 which advocated the conversion of Hindus to Christianity. The city of Forbesganj in Araria District in the state of Bihar is named after him. He used to live in the place called Sultan pokhar (pond), and the house in which he lived still stands at the compound . The Area around his house was called Residential area, in short form R-Area, which gradually over time, mixing with the local tongue, changed into Araria *R-Area.

== Gallery ==
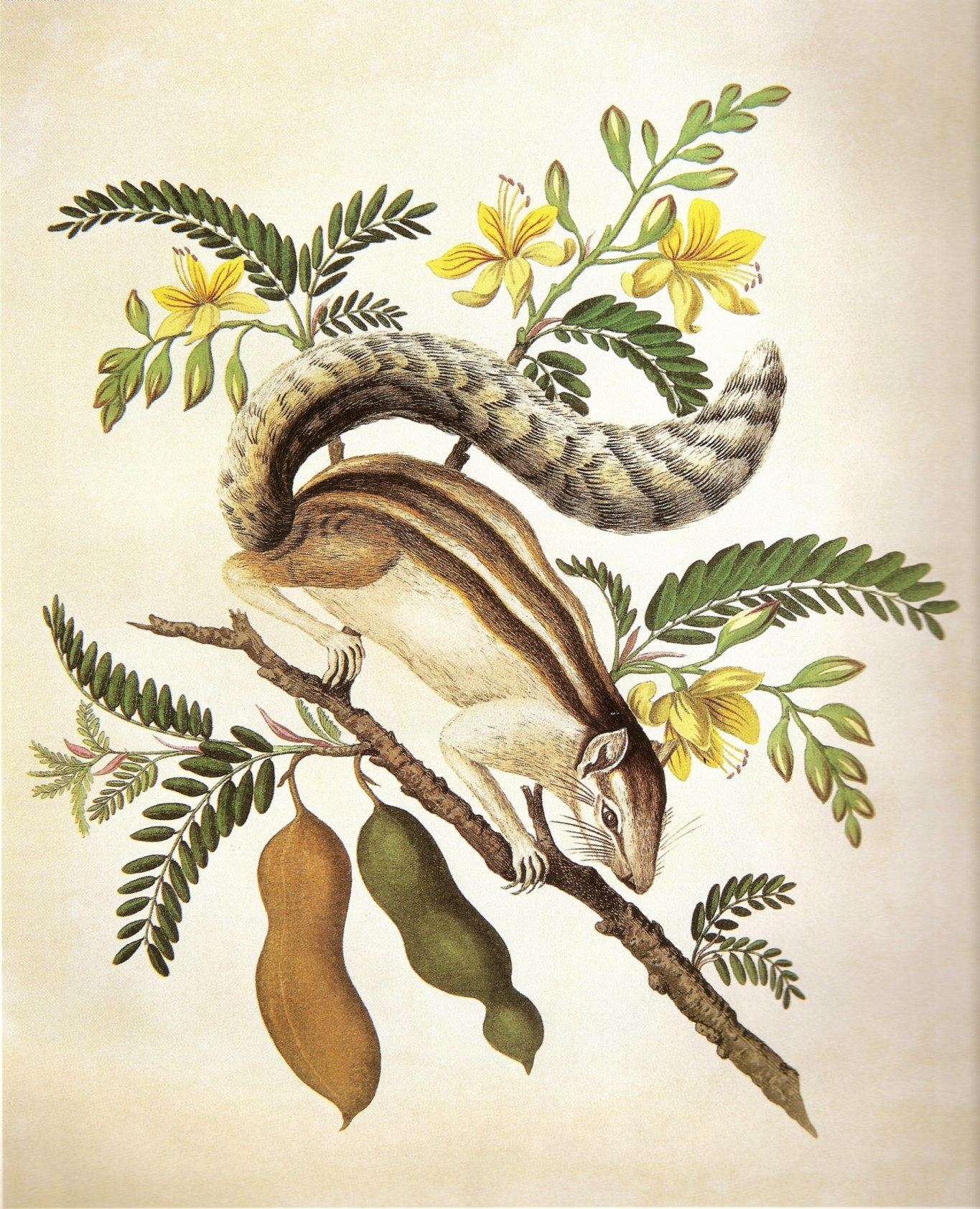
Common Striped Squirrel on a Tamarind tree

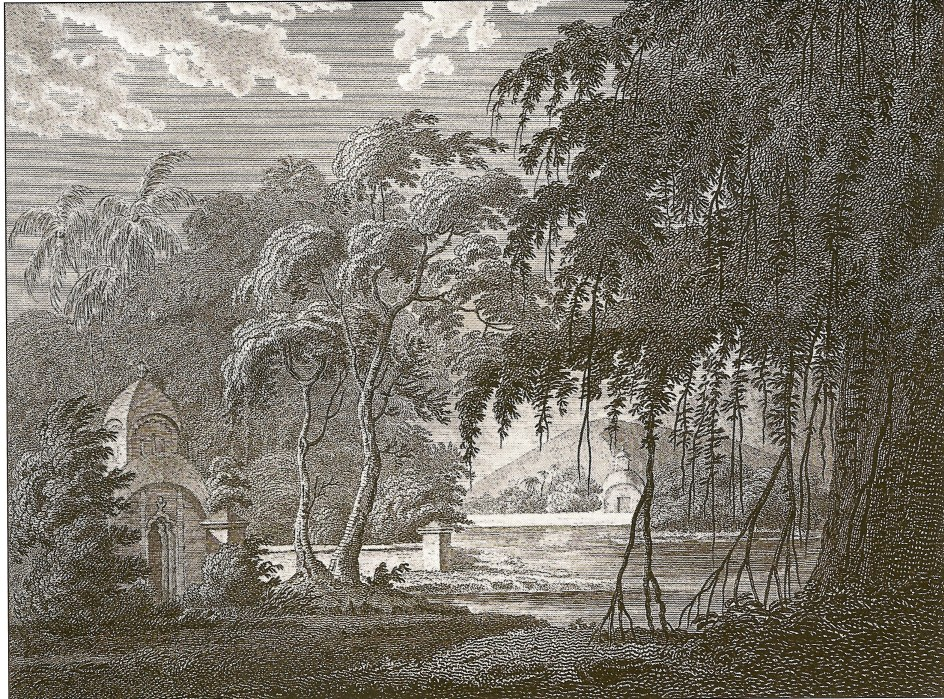
The Sacred Hindoo Grove near Chandod on the Banks of the Nerbudda

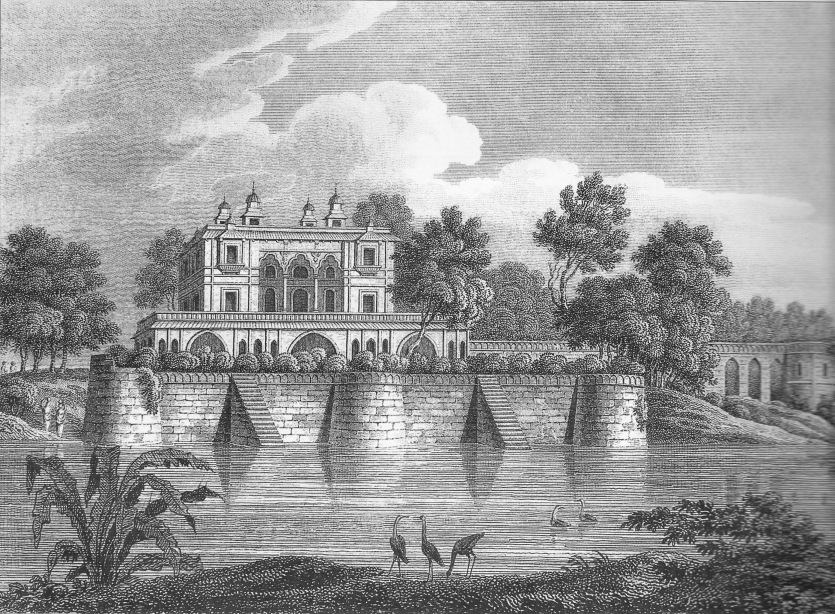
Shah Baug, a Summer Palace Built by the Emperor Shah Jehan on the
Banks of the Sabermatty.

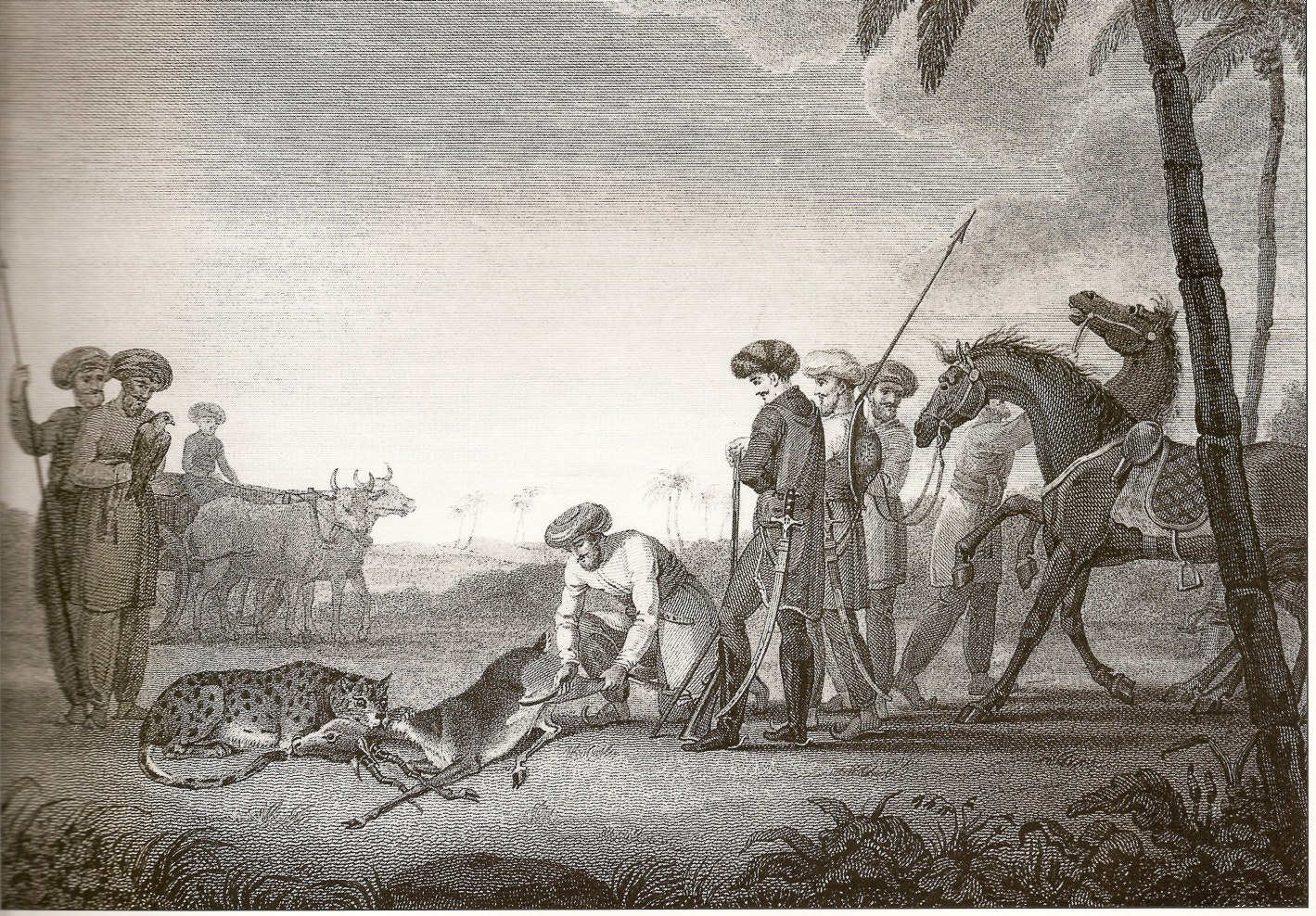
Hunting of Blackbuck with Cheetah

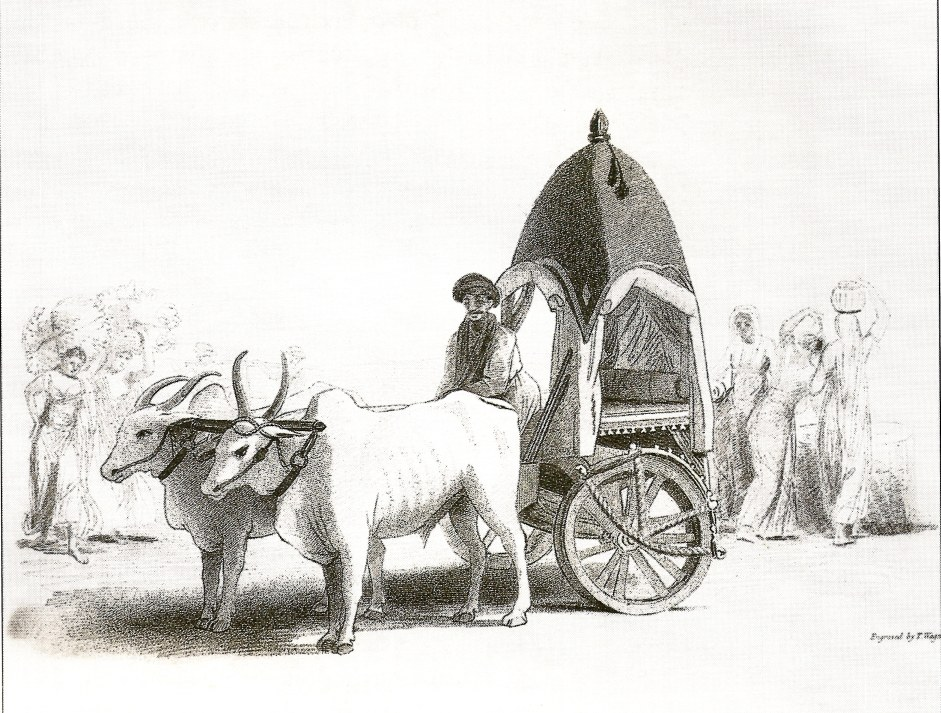
An Indian Hackaree Drawn by
Guzerat Oxen

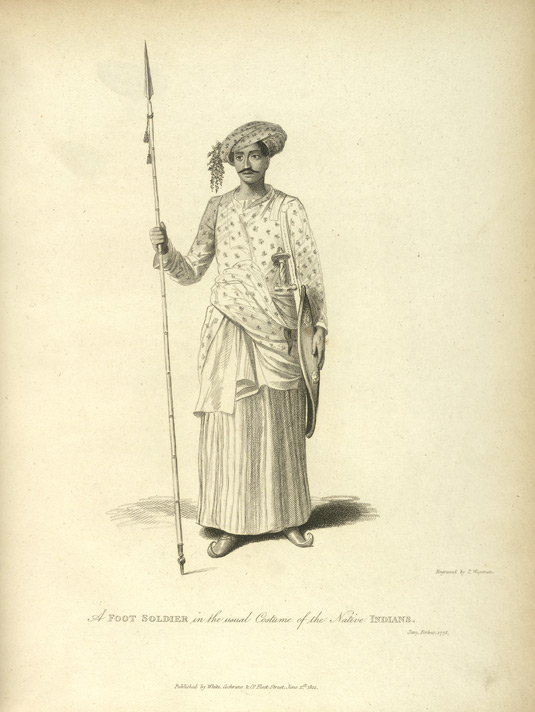
Spear-man in the Service of the Ragobah
