= Statue of Rama =

Monument to Rama at Ayodhya, Uttar Pradesh, India

- Interactive map of Statue of Rama
- Location: Ayodhya, Uttar Pradesh, India
- Designer: Ram V. Sutar
- Type: Statue
- Width: 181 m (594 ft)
- Height: 251 m (823 ft)
- Dedicated to: Rama

The Statue of Rama is a planned monument in Ayodhya, Uttar Pradesh, India dedicated to the Hindu god Rama. The statue will be 181 m (594 ft) in breadth and 251 m (823 ft) tall including plinth and umbrella. The cost of the statue is estimated to be ₹2,500 crore (equivalent to ₹29 billion or US$310 million in 2023).

== Plan ==
The Yogi Adityanath government had announced in 2017 that it would construct a Rama statue in Ayodhya as part of the “Navya Ayodhya” scheme of the UP Tourism Department to develop the area into a tourist center. On 24 November 2018, the design of the statue was finalised. On 2 March 2019, the Uttar Pradesh cabinet cleared ₹ 200 crore for the "detailed project report" as well as for 28.28 hectares identified for the project. Technical support from the Gujarat government, National Environmental Engineering Research Institute and IIT Kanpur has been sought.

In November 2019, ₹447 crore (equivalent to ₹526 crore or US$55 million in 2023) was allocated to acquire 61 hectares of land in Mirpur, Ayodhya, for the statue, museum, library, food court and other tourist amenities. However due to land uncertainties, the location has not been finalized and may be shifted to Manja Barhata village in Ayodhya.

The statue of Rama would be accompanied by one of Nishadaraja Kevata, a boatman who helped Rama, Sita and Laxman cross the Ganga when in exile. Yogi Adityanath, the chief minister of Uttar Pradesh, had in September said ₹ 34 crore would be allocated for the project of Nishadraj.

In August 2019, Member of Parliament Karan Singh had asked the government of Uttar Pradesh to build both a statue for Rama as well as his consort Sita. Karan Singh had also made the same request in December 2018.

== See also ==
- List of tallest statues
- Statue of Unity
