= Orsang =

River in Gujarat, India

Coordinates: 22°25′N 74°11′E

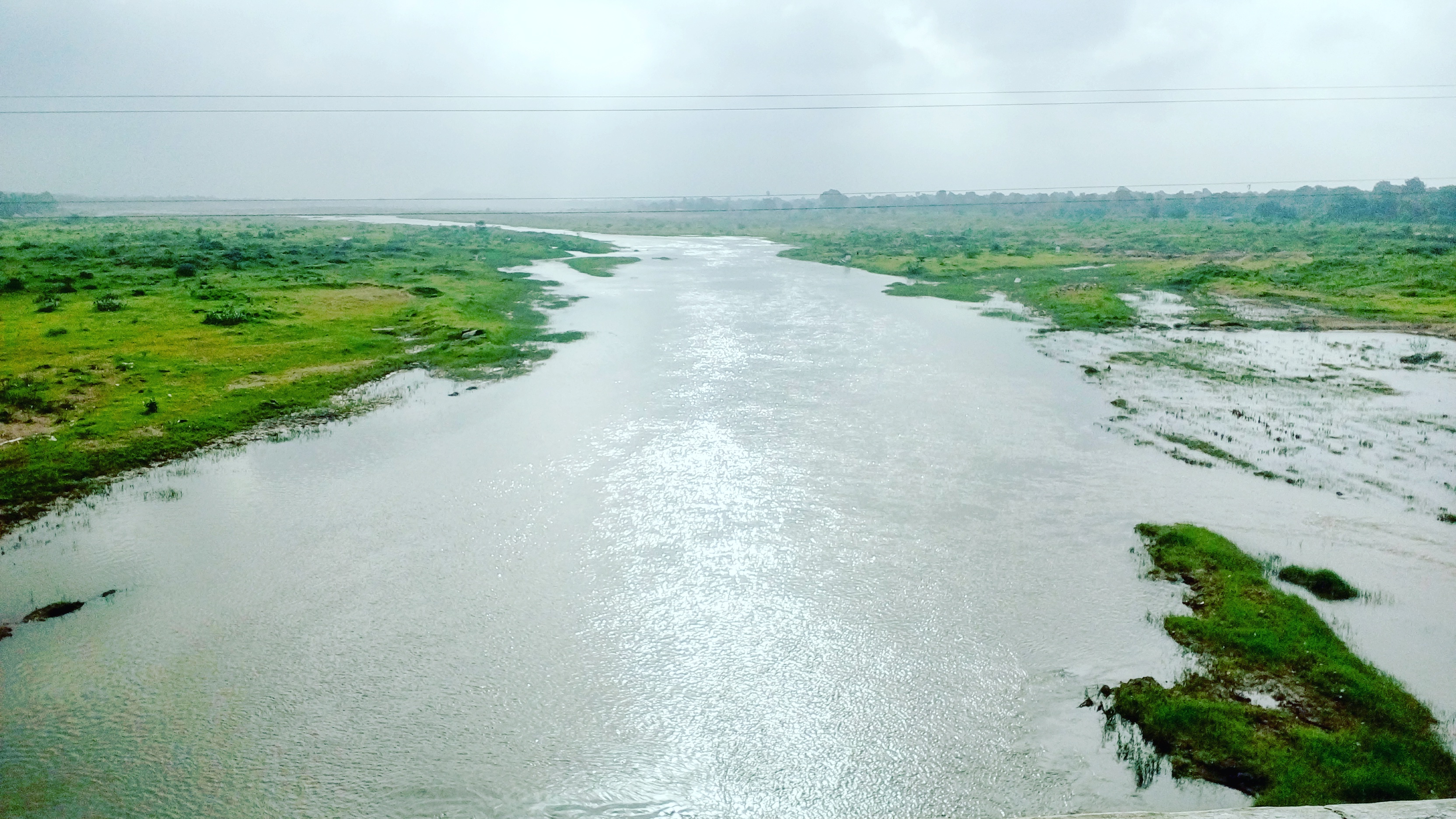
Orsang river near Bodeli

The Orsang River flows through the Chhota Udaipur district and Vadodara district in Gujarat, India. It joins the Narmada River at the village of Chandod. It originates from the forest of Bhavra in Madhya Pradesh and enters in Gujarat near Chhota Udepur town.

The river is the primary provider of sand within Gujarat, which encourages a variety of sand mining activities, especially within the region between Bodeli and Chhota Udepur.
