= Dhar railway station =

Railway station in Madhya Pradesh

Dhar Junction
- Indian Railways logo

General information
- Location: MP SH-31, Navgaon, Dhar, Madhya Pradesh; India
- Coordinates: 22.5938203°N 75.3031942°E
- Elevation: 552 metres (1,811 ft)
- System: Indian Railways station
- Owner: Indian Railways
- Operator: Western Railways
- Lines: Chhota Udaipur–Dhar line, Indore–Dahod line
- Platforms: 3
- Tracks: 4 broad gauge

Construction
- Structure type: Standard (on-ground station)
- Parking: under construction
- Cycle facilities: No

Other information
- Status: Under Construction
- Station code: DHAR
- Zone(s): Western Railway zone
- Division(s): Ratlam

History
- Opened: TBA
- Electrified: Ongoing
Location
- Location within Madhya Pradesh Location within India

Dhar Junction railway station is an under-construction railway station in Dhar district, Madhya Pradesh. Its code is DHAR. It will serve Dhar city. The station will consist of four platforms. The station will lie at the junction of the Chhota Udaipur–Dhar line and the Indore–Dahod line which come under the Ratlam railway division of Western Railway.
