= Chhota Udaipur–Dhar line =

Railway line in India

Overview
- Status: Partiailly Operational
- Owner: Indian Railways
- Locale: Gujarat; Madhya Pradesh
- Termini: Chhota Udaipur; Dhar
- Website: www.indianrailways.gov.in

Service
- Operator: Western Railway

History
- Opened: October 30, 2019; 6 years ago (Chhota Udaipur–Alirajpur section)

Technical
- Track length: 157 km (98 mi)
- Number of tracks: 1
- Track gauge: 5 ft 6 in (1,676 mm) broad gauge
- Operating speed: up to 80 km/h (50 mph)

The Chhota Udaipur–Dhar line is a railway line under construction from Chhota Udaipur railway station to Dhar railway station. It is a part of Western Railway zone of Indian Railways.

This corridor passes through the ranges of Chhota Udaipur Hills in Gujarat and Sondwara Plateau in Madhya Pradesh. It will play an important role in directly connecting Vadodara and Indore and also it's a joint project of Indore–Dahod line. It will put Dhar first time on the railway line. This was demanded over decades by the residents of Nimar region as well as Central Gujarat.

It's also an important tourism destination by rail after connecting with Alirajpur and Dhar. Where Alirajpur is famous for wood carvings and mango farms, Dhar is famous for historical tourist destinations.

== Main line sections ==
This line is divided into two sections:
1) The first section is of Chhota Udaipur–Alirajpur section with the length of 49 km (30 mi).
2) The second section is of Alirajpur–Dhar section with the length of 108 km (67 mi).

== Stations ==
Chhota Udaipur–Dhar line
#	Station Name	Station Code	From Ahmedabad	Connections
1	Chhota Udaipur	CTD	205.2 Km	Miyagam Karjan–Chhota Udaipur line
2	Padaliya Road	PLRD	214.5 Km	None
3	Moti Sadhli	MTSI	227.5 Km	None
4	Ambari Richhavi	ABRV	239.6 Km	None
5	Alirajpur	ARPR	253.7 Km	None
5	Khandala	KADA	263.5 Km	None
6	Jobat	JOBAT	273.9 Km	None
7	Dekakund	---	---	None
8	Kakarwa	---	---	None
9	Tanda Road	---	---	None
10	Kodi	---	---	None
11	Jamaniya	---	---	None
12	Maphatpura	---	---	None
13	Dhar	DHAR	362.2 Km	Indore–Dahod line

== Projects ==
In 2014, Prime Minister's office has given clearance to this line and report was forwarded to Ministry of Railway. As a report of the line was sent to railway ministry for the railway line from Khandwa to Dhar via Khargone and Barwani by Government of Madhya Pradesh and was against considered for 2008-09 railway budget for survey. This railway line will be laid on 157-km Chhota Udaipur-Dhar rail line was that to be built at a cost ₹1,286 crore (US$130 million).

Currently, the first section of this line was opened on 30 October 2019 and a passenger train on this route also started running. The second section of this line is partly constructed up to Jobat. Jobat Railway station is 274 kilometres (170 mi) from Ahmedabad & 174 kilometres (108 mi) from Vadodara.

== Present status ==
- 2026 Aug: Jobat-Tanda Road section gets CRS approval, Tanda-Road to Dhar section is under-construction.
- 2025 Dec: Out of total 157 km, 72 km track (Chhota Udaipur-Alirajpur-Jobat) is already operational. On the remaining Jobat-Tanda section 90% of earthwork is complete and construction on five major bridges and station buildings (Dekakund, Kakarwa, and Tanda Road) was underway; on the Tanda-Dhar section (at Dhar it connects to the under-construction Indore–Dahod line) the land acquisition and bridge work was in progress. Once completed, this line will provide a direct broad-gauge link between Vadodara and Indore, significantly reducing travel time between these regions. The target completion is 2027.

== See also ==
- Akola–Ratlam line, target completion of March 2028
- Bhopal-Ramganj Mandi line, under-construction with target completion by December 2027, will provide shorter route from Ludiana-Hisar-Jaipur-Kota to Bhopal
- Chhota Udaipur–Dhar line, target completion date of 2027.
- Indore–Dahod line, target completion date of February 2027.
- Wardha–Nanded line, under-construction via Yavatmal-Pusad target completion by 2027-28, will provide shorter route from North India to Pusad-Nanded.
- Future of rail transport in India
