= Mahamana Express =

Superfast train in India

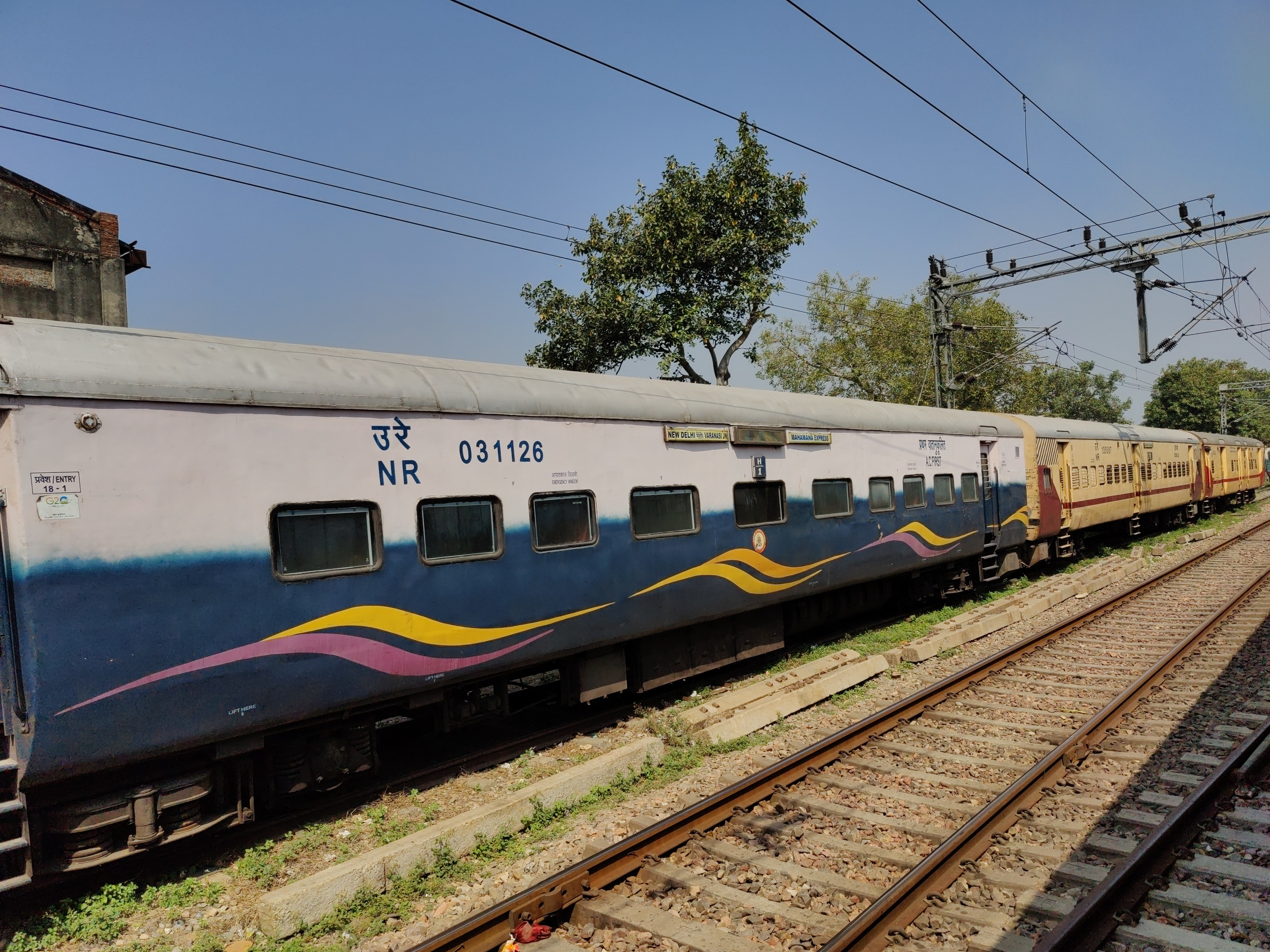
- New Delhi-Varanasi Mahamana Express

Overview
- Status: Active
- First service: 22 January 2016; 10 years ago
- Current operator: Indian Railways
- Website: http://indianrail.gov.in

On-board services
- Classes: AC 1st Class, 2 Tier, 3 Tier and Sleeper
- Seating arrangements: Yes
- Sleeping arrangements: Yes
- Catering facilities: On-board catering
- Entertainment facilities: Electric outlets Reading Lights & Curtains (In some classes)
- Baggage facilities: Underseat / Overhead racks
- Other facilities: Bedrolls (In 1A, 2A, 3A classes only); Passenger Information System

Technical
- Rolling stock: ICF rakes (Modified Interiors) and normal LHB rakes
- Track gauge: 1,676 mm (5 ft 6 in) broad gauge
- Track owner: Indian Railways

Mahamana Express is a superfast express series of trains operated by Indian Railways in India. Initially it was started using ICF coaches with substantially improved facilities as compared to other superfast express trains in India. As of June 2025, only one Mahamana Express services use the original upgraded ICF coaches which is the Bhopal Khajuraho Mahamana Express, that got LHB coaches from 15 Feb 2026. The others have been converted to regular LHB coaches as in most other trains in India.

This train is named in the honour of Madan Mohan Malaviya (Mahamana), a freedom fighter and an education reformer who established Banaras Hindu University, Varanasi.

== Overview ==
Mahamana Express was launched in 2016 with improved facilities for passengers compared to other superfast express trains in India. The first Mahamana Express connected Delhi and Varanasi. The first run saw a 15% hike in fare due to the upgraded facilities.

== Model Rake ==
The train was introduced with Model Rakes modified by Indian Railways under Make In India scheme. The coaches contain some modern facilities like:

- Toilet: Bigger mirror, platform wash basin, controlled discharged water tap, odour control system, exhaust fans, LED lights, dustbin inside the toilet, All the toilets are fitted with bio-toilets, in line with Indian Railways' vision to make tracks defecation free.
- Ladder: Ergonomically designed Ladders for climbing up to upper berths are provided in all coaches.
- Side berths: Snack tables are provided for side berth passengers also with innovative design side lower berth arrangement.
- Windows: Windows with powered Venetian blinds and roller blinds instead of conventional curtains.
- Lighting: LED-based berth indicators for reserved coaches, and all other illumination.
- Charging Points: Charging points are made available for every berth.
- Safety: Fire extinguishers in all coaches.
- Pantry Car: Modular pantry with electric chimneys.

== Traction ==
Since inaugural run, the first Mahamana Express ran on ICF Rakes with WDM-3A or WDP-4 and WAP-5. Since 2026, all Mahamana Express have been upgraded to LHB Coaches and are now hauled by WAP-5 and WAP-7 locomotives.

== Active routes ==
There are 6 active routes of Mahamana Express below:

Number	Route	First Run	Rake
22417/18	Varanasi - New Delhi Mahamana Express	22 January 2016	LHB
22163/64	Bhopal - Khajuraho Mahamana Express	13 July 2017	LHB
20903/04	Ekta Nagar - Varanasi Mahamana Express	22 September 2017	LHB
20905/06	Ekta Nagar - Rewa Mahamana Express	09 March 2019	LHB
19319/20	Veraval - Indore Mahamana Express	29 June 2018	LHB
19333/34	Indore - Bikaner Mahamana Express	26 January 2019	LHB

== See also ==
- AC Superfast Express
- Bullet train (Mumbai-Ahmedabad)
- Vande Bharat Express
- Gatimaan Express
- Humsafar Express
- Tejas Express
- Double Decker Express
- Duronto Express
- Rajdhani Express
- Shatabdi Express
- Jan Shatabdi Express
- Garib Rath Express
- Antyodaya Express
- Uday Express
- Yuva Express
