= Vadodara railway division =

Railway division in Western railway zone, India

Vadodara railway division is one of the six railway divisions under the jurisdiction of Western Railway zone of the Indian Railways. This railway division was formed on 1 April 1952 and its headquarter is located at Vadodara in the state of Gujarat of India.

Mumbai WR railway division, Ahmedabad railway division, Bhavnagar railway division, Rajkot railway division and Ratlam railway division are the other five railway divisions under WR Zone headquartered at Churchgate, Mumbai.

== List of railway stations and towns ==
The list includes the stations under the Vadodara railway division and their station category.

Category of station	No. of stations	Names of stations
A-1 Category	1	Vadodara Junction
A Category	7	Anand Junction, Bharuch Junction, Ankleshwar Junction, Nadiad Junction, Dabhoi Junction, Chhayapuri, Ektanagar (Kevadiya)
B Category	-	-
C Category (Suburban station)	-	-
D Category	5	Pratapnagar, Chhota Udaipur, Alirajpur, Bodeli, Vasad Junction
E Category	-	-
F Category; Halt Station	-	-
Total	190	-
