= Joseph Holmes (photographer) =

Joseph E. Holmes is a color, natural light, landscape photographer from California. He is an innovator in the field of inkjet fine art print making, and has developed his own visual calibration software.

== Life and work ==
Joseph Holmes has photographed wild landscapes for over 49 years.

He has patented a visual calibration system, which is part of the ColorBlind Prove it! software he authored for monitor calibration. He designed Ekta Space PS5, J.Holmes (also known as Ekta Space or Joe RGB) to cover the whole gamut of Ektachrome films as a large-gamut alternative to Adobe RGB; it can be usedwith any E6 film. He has also invented and patented the small gamut way of monochrome image printing. It ensures no colors are "clipped", when converted from the input color space, and that the characteristics of film stocks keep their fidelity.

Holmes is a pioneer in the comparatively recent development of using inkjet printers for fine art print making. He has said:

The best thing about using color management is the ability to see very accurate soft proofs of output: that is, the monitor-to-print match. Most vendors of monitor and profiling software don't seem to understand how important ambient lighting, critical print lighting and screen surround colors are in soft proofing, so most instructions for setting up soft proofing fall short and make side-by-side, screen-to-print matches less accurate than one would like. This is perhaps the third biggest problem for most people, after the overall complexity of color management and inadequate gamma mapping in printer profiles.

In July 2005, his exhibition, Wild Landscapes, at the Ordover Gallery, California, of "wild" areas of North County demonstrated 35 years spent in development of printing processes.

His publications include many posters, the series of Last Wildlands calendars, produced with David Brower at Friends of the Earth for nine years, and three books, including two books of landscape photography: Joseph Holmes • Natural Light (1989) and Canyons of the Colorado (1996).

His work is available through the Ansel Adams Gallery.

== Books by Holmes ==
- The Father of Waters: A Mississippi River Chronicle. San Francisco: Sierra Club Books, 1982
- Natural Light. Berkeley, Calif.: Yolla Bolly, 1990.
- Canyons of the Colorado. San Francisco: Chronicle, 1996. ISBN 0-8118-1417-3.
