= MGR Chennai Central–Ekta Nagar Superfast Express =

Train in India

Overview
- Service type: Superfast
- First service: 17 January 2021; 5 years ago
- Current operator: Western Railway

Route
- Termini: MGR Chennai Central (MAS); Ekta Nagar (EKNR)
- Stops: 14
- Distance travelled: 1,701 km (1,057 mi)
- Average journey time: 29 hrs 30 mins
- Service frequency: Weekly (Note: Runs one day in a week for every direction.)
- Train number: 20919 / 20920

On-board services
- Classes: AC 2 tier, AC 3 tier, Sleeper class, General Unreserved
- Seating arrangements: Yes
- Sleeping arrangements: Yes
- Catering facilities: Available
- Observation facilities: Large windows
- Baggage facilities: Available
- Other facilities: Below the seats

Technical
- Rolling stock: LHB coach
- Track gauge: 1,676 mm (5 ft 6 in)
- Operating speed: 58 km/h (36 mph) average including halts.

The 20919 / 20920 MGR Chennai Central–Ekta Nagar Superfast Express is a Superfast train belonging to Western Railway zone that runs between MGR Chennai Central and Ekta Nagar in India. It is currently being operated with 20919/20920 train numbers on a weekly basis.

== Coach composition ==
The train has LHB rakes with a maximum speed of 110 km/h. The train consists of 18 coaches:

- 1 AC II Tier
- 4 AC III Tier
- 7 Sleeper coaches
- 4 General Unreserved
- 2 EOG cum Luggage Rake

== Service ==
20919/Chennai Central – Ekta Nagar Superfast Express has an average speed of 60 km/h and covers 1701 km in 28 hrs 20 mins.

20920/Ekta Nagar – Chennai Central Superfast Express has an average speed of 55 km/h and covers 1701 km in 30 hrs 45 mins.

== Route & halts ==
The important halts of the train are:

- MGR Chennai Central
- Arakkonam Junction
- Renigunta Junction
- Kadapa
- Guntakal Junction
- Raichur Junction
- Solapur
- Pune Junction
- Kalyan Junction
- Vasai Road
- Vapi
- Valsad
- Surat
- Vadodara
- Ekta Nagar

== Traction ==
Both trains are hauled by a Vadodara Loco Shed or Tughlakabad Loco Shed-based WAP-7 (HOG)-equipped locomotive from end to end.

== See also ==
- Ekta Nagar railway station
- Chennai Central railway station
