= Pratapnagar railway station =

Railway station in Gujarat, India

Pratapnagar

General information
- Location: Vadodara Police Headquarter lane, Danteshwar, Vadodara, Gujarat; India
- Coordinates: 22.2815°N 73.2109°E
- Elevation: 34.430 metres (112.96 ft)
- System: Indian Railway station
- Owner: Indian Railways
- Operator: Western Railway Zone
- Lines: Vadodara–Chhota Udaipur line Pratapnagar–Samni line(Under gauge conversion)
- Platforms: 4
- Tracks: 6

Construction
- Structure type: Standard on ground
- Parking: Yes
- Cycle facilities: Yes
- Accessible: Available

Other information
- Status: Functioning
- Station code: PRTN
- Zone(s): Western Railway
- Division(s): Vadodara
Location
- Location within Gujarat Location within India

Pratapnagar railway station (station code: PRTN) is a railway station in Vadodara city of Gujarat state.

== Pratapnagar Workshop ==
Pratapnagar railway station has a workshop for maintaining coaches and carriage wagons. The foundation stone of Pratapnagar workshop was laid by His Highness Lord Chelmsford and Viceroy of India in 1919. Pratapnagar workshop was started in 1922.

== Trains ==
Following trains start from Pratapnagar railway station:

- 59117/18 Pratapnagar–Chhota Udaipur Passenger
- 59119/20 Pratapnagar–Chhota Udaipur Passenger
- 59121/22 Pratapnagar–Alirajpur Passenger
- 79455/56 Vadodara–Chhota Udaipur DEMU
- 79461/62 Pratapnagar-Dabhoi-Miyagam Karjan DEMU

== Diesel Loco Shed, Pratapnagar ==
Diesel loco shed, Pratapnagar is a narrow gauge diesel locomotive shed that was commissioned in 1990 to serve the narrow gauge routes in Gujarat.

Serial No.	Locomotive Class	Horsepower	Holding
1.	ZDM-5	450	18
Total Locomotives Active as of October 2025			18

== See also ==
- Vadodara Junction railway station
- Dabhoi Junction railway station
- Chhota Udaipur railway station
- Bodeli railway station
- Ekta Nagar railway station
