= Kevadia =

Kevadia Ekta Nagar
- Census town
- Kevadia
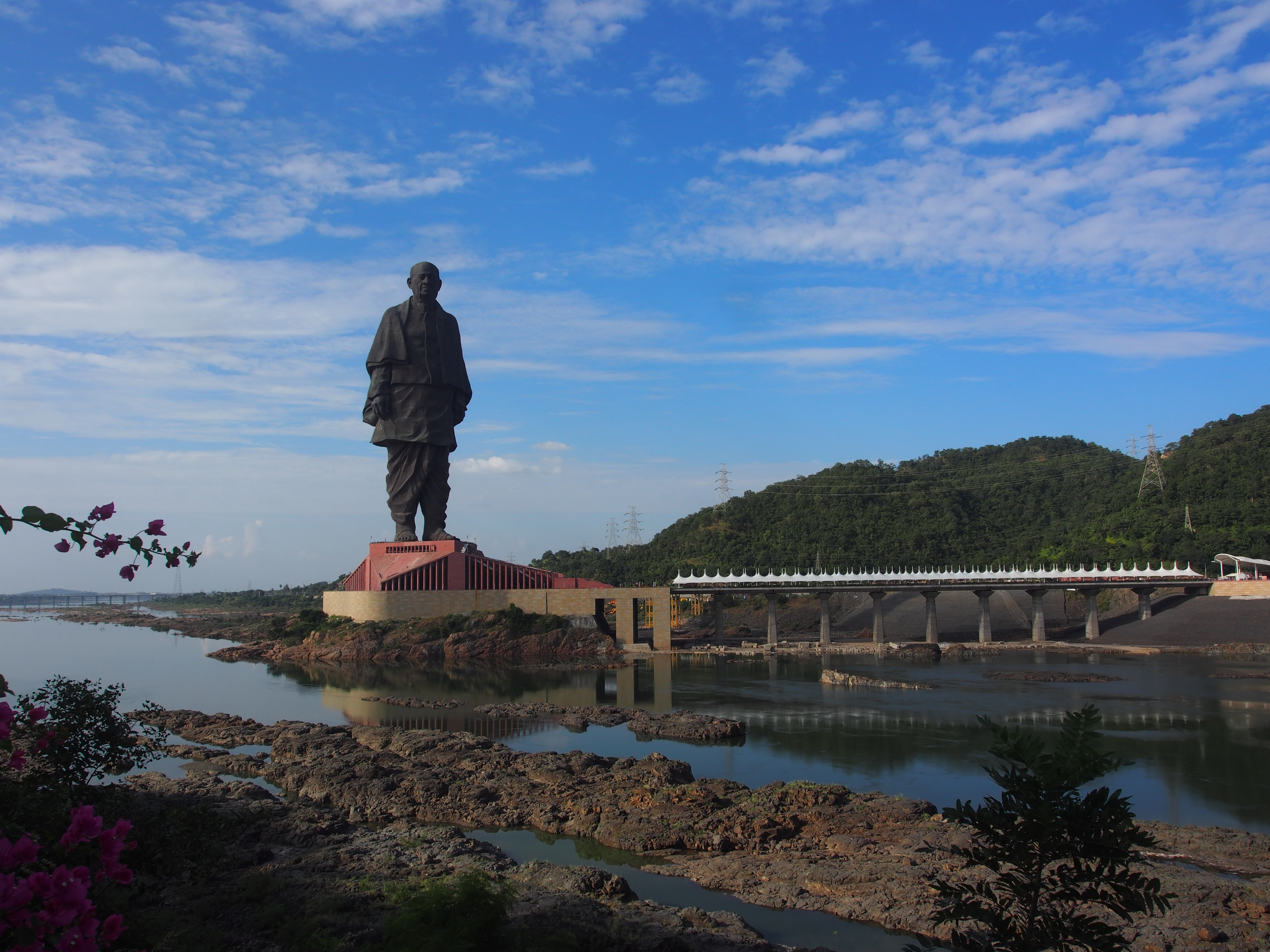

- Location in Gujarat, India Kevadia (India)
- Coordinates: 21.875°N 73.691°E
- Country: India
- State: Gujarat
- District: Narmada

Population (2011)
  - Total: 6,788

Languages
  - Official: Gujarati
- Time zone: UTC+5:30 (IST)
- Vehicle registration: GJ-22
- Website: gujaratindia.com

Kevadia is a census town in Narmada district in the Indian state of Gujarat. The town is best known as the location of the Statue of Unity, the tallest statue in the world. The town is also home to the Kevadia railway station.

== Demographics ==
As of 2001 India census, Kevadia had a population of 12,705. Males constituted 53% of the population and females 47%. Kevadia's average literacy rate was 80%, compared to the national average of 59.5%: male literacy was 85%, and female literacy 75%. Eleven percent of the population was under 6 years of age.

== Tourist attractions ==
- Statue of Unity
- Narmada Tent City
- Sardar Sarovar Dam
- Shoolpaneshwar Wildlife Sanctuary
