= Chhota Udaipur railway station =

Railway station in Gujarat, India

Chhota Udaipur
- Indian Railways logo

General information
- Location: Chhota Udaipur, Gujarat; India
- Coordinates: 22°18′54″N 74°00′51″E
- Elevation: 153 metres (502 ft)
- System: Indian Railways station
- Owner: Indian Railways
- Operator: Western Railway
- Lines: Chhota Udaipur–Dhar line, Chhota Udaipur–Vadodara line
- Platforms: 2
- Tracks: 4 5 ft 6 in (1,676 mm) broad gauge
- Connections: Auto stand

Construction
- Structure type: Standard (on ground station)
- Parking: Yes
- Cycle facilities: No
- Accessible: Available

Other information
- Status: Functioning
- Station code: CTD
- Zone(s): Western Railway zone
- Division(s): Vadodara
Location
- Location within Gujarat Location within India

Chhota Udaipur railway station is a railway station in Chhota Udaipur district, Gujarat. Its code is CTD and it serves Chhota Udaipur town. The station lacks running water and sanitation and its two platforms are not well sheltered.

== History ==
In 2014, the Prime Minister's office gave clearance for the line and the report was forwarded to the Ministry of Railway for a proposed broad-gauge railway line from Chhota Udaipur to Ratlam via Alirajpur, Khargone, Barwani through to Dhar. This railway line connected Dhar to the railway system for the first time after being demanded for a decade by the residents of Nimar region, as well as Eastern Gujarat. It is to span 157-km, to be built at a cost Rs 1,286 crore.

== Trains ==
- 59117/18/19 Pratapnagar–Chhota Udaipur Passenger
- 59121/22 Pratapnagar–Alirajpur Passenger
- 79455/56 Vadodara–Chhota Udaipur DEMU

== See also ==
- Vadodara Junction railway station
- Pratapnagar railway station
- Bodeli railway station
- Alirajpur railway station
