= Bodeli railway station =

Railway station in Gujarat, India

Bodeli
- Indian Railways logo

General information
- Location: Bodeli, Chhota Udaipur district, Gujarat; India
- Coordinates: 22.27914°N 73.71036°E
- Elevation: 84 metres (276 ft)
- System: Indian Railways station
- Owner: Indian Railways
- Operator: Western Railway
- Line: Vadodara–Chhota Udaipur line
- Platforms: 2
- Tracks: 3

Construction
- Structure type: Standard on ground
- Parking: Yes
- Cycle facilities: No
- Accessible: Available

Other information
- Status: Functional
- Station code: BDE
- Zone(s): Western Railway
- Division(s): Vadodara

History
- Electrified: Work in progress
Location
- Location within Gujarat Location within India

Bodeli railway station (station code: BDE) is the main railway station in the Indian city of Bodeli in Chhota Udaipur district of Gujarat state.

== Trains ==
- 59117/18 Pratapnagar–Chhota Udaipur Passenger
- 59119/20 Pratapnagar–Chhota Udaipur Passenger
- 59121/22 Pratapnagar–Alirajpur Passenger
- 79455/56 Vadodara–Chhota Udaipur DEMU

== See also ==
- Vadodara Junction railway station
- Pratapnagar railway station
- Chhota Udaipur railway station
- Alirajpur railway station
