= Samajik Ekta Party =

Political party in Haryana, India

Samajik Ekta Party (SEP) is a registered unrecognised political party in Haryana, India. The party is led by Nafe Singh Dahiya.

The party is based in Sonipat, Haryana. According to available records, its office is located at 22, Housing Board Colony."Samajik Ekta Party". MyNeta.

Ahead of the 1999 Haryana Legislative Assembly elections, the party was part of the Haryana Sarvjatiya Morcha, a political alliance in the state.

The party contests elections in Haryana and is listed as a registered unrecognised party."Election Commission Haryana document" (PDF).

== See also ==
- List of political parties in Haryana
