= Ekta Space =

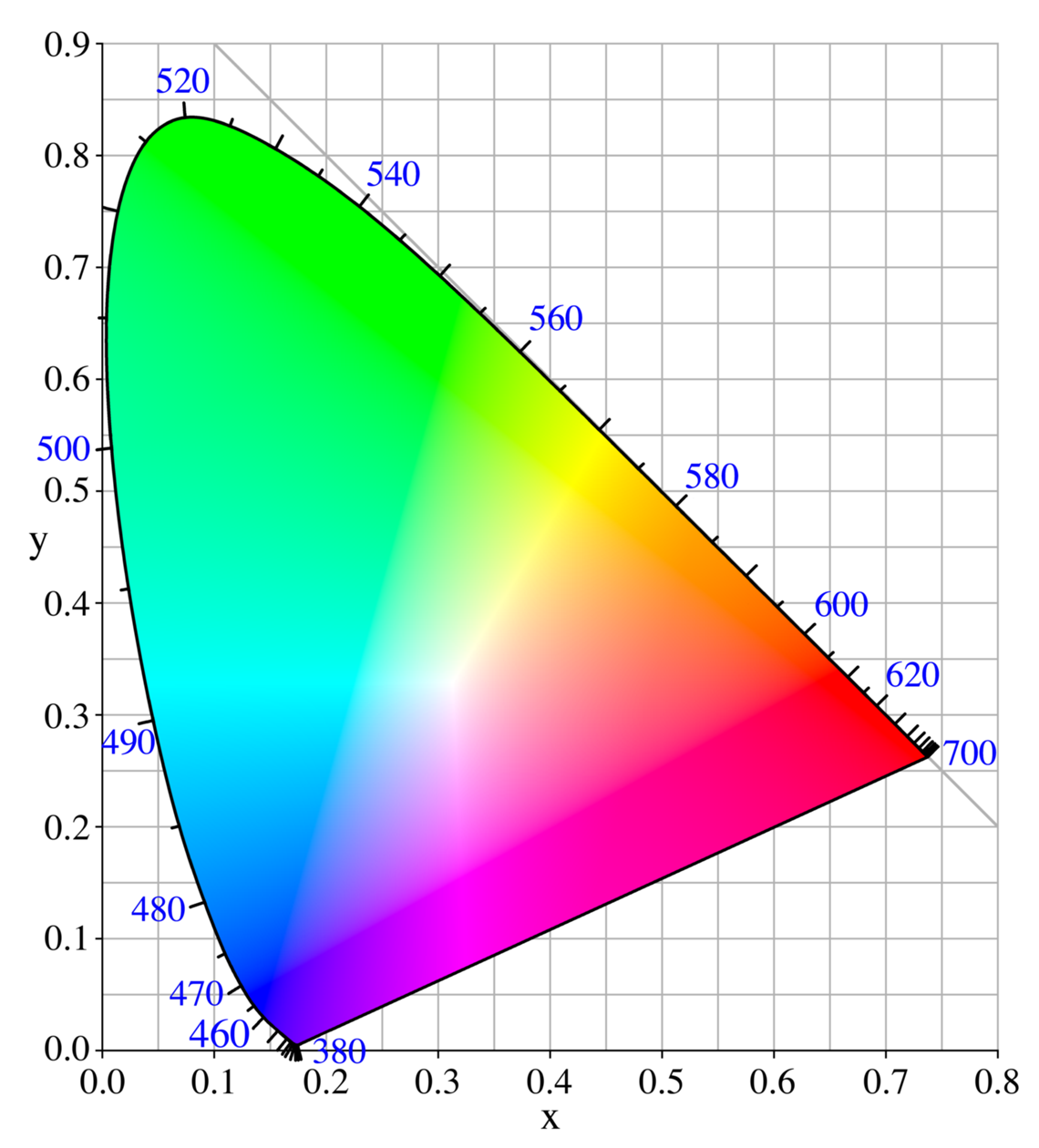
The CIE color space chromaticity diagram. The outer curved boundary is the spectral (or monochromatic) locus, with wavelengths shown in nanometers. Note that the image itself describes colors using sRGB, and colors outside the sRGB gamut cannot be displayed properly. Depending on the color space and calibration of your display device, the sRGB colors may not be displayed properly either. This diagram displays the maximally saturated bright colors that can be produced by a computer monitor or television set.

The Ekta Space is a common name for two color spaces developed by Joseph Holmes - Ekta Space PS 5 and Ektachrome Space to safely contain fine image scans of film originals generally of 24-bit color depth.
