= Varanasi Mahamana Express =

Train in India

Varanasi Junction – New Delhi Mahamana Express
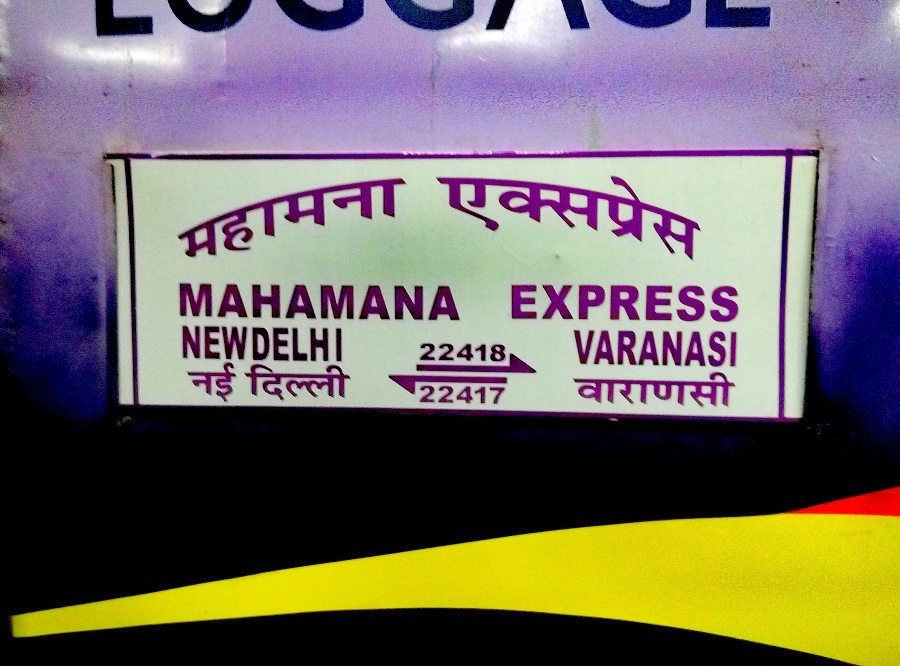

Overview
- Service type: Superfast Express, Mahamana Express
- Locale: Delhi & Uttar Pradesh
- First service: 25 January 2016; 10 years ago
- Current operator: Northern Railway

Route
- Termini: Varanasi Junction (BSB); New Delhi (NDLS)
- Stops: 7
- Distance travelled: 774 km (481 mi)
- Average journey time: 13 hours 10 minutes
- Service frequency: Tri-weekly
- Train number: 22417 / 22418

On-board services
- Classes: AC First Class, AC 2 Tier, AC 3 Tier, Sleeper Class, General Unreserved
- Seating arrangements: Yes
- Sleeping arrangements: Yes
- Catering facilities: Available
- Observation facilities: Large windows
- Baggage facilities: No
- Other facilities: Below the seats

Technical
- Rolling stock: LHB coach
- Track gauge: 5 ft 6 in (1,676 mm); Broad Gauge
- Operating speed: 59 km/h (37 mph) average including halts
Route map
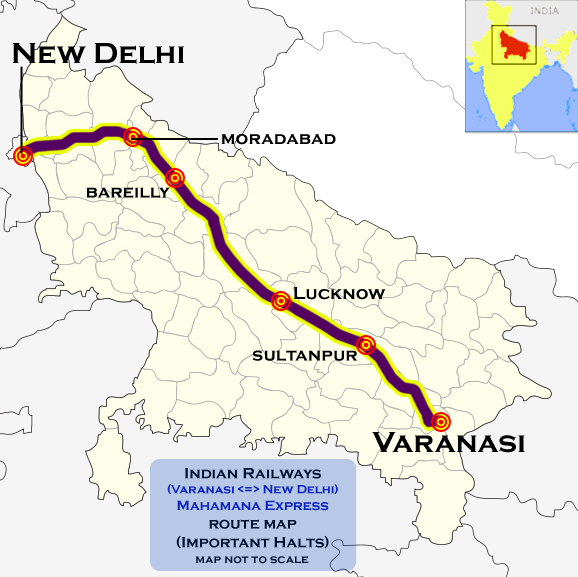

The 22417 / 22418 Varanasi Mahamana Express is a tri-weekly Mahamana Express class train operated by Indian Railways, which runs between the cities of New Delhi & Varanasi via Ghaziabad, Moradabad, Bareilly, Lucknow, Sultanpur & Jaunpur city.

== History ==
This was the first Mahamana Express train of Indian Railways. The train was flagged off by Narendra Modi, the Prime Minister of India on 22 January 2016 from Varanasi Junction through video conferencing.
It is currently owned & operated by Northern Railway Zone of Indian Railways organization.

== Coach composition ==
LOCO SLR GS H1 A1 PC S1 S2 S3 S4 S5 S6 S7 S8 S9 GS EoG reverse in UP direction

== Traction ==
earlier was WAP-4, WDM-3A now they carried by WAP-5 and WAP-7 end to end

== Schedule ==
| Train Number | Station Code | Departure Station | Departure Time | Departure Days | Arrival Station | Arrival Time | Arrival Days |
|---|---|---|---|---|---|---|---|
| 22417 | BSB | Varanasi | 6:55 PM | Tuesday, Thursday, Saturday | New Delhi | 8:20 AM | Wednesday, Friday, Sunday |
| 22418 | NDLS | New Delhi | 6:35 PM | Monday, Wednesday, Friday | Varanasi | 8:25 AM | Tuesday, Thursday, Saturday |

== See also ==
- Mahamana Express
- Kashi Vishwanath Express
- Vadodara – Varanasi Mahamana Express
- Bhopal – Khajuraho Mahamana Superfast Express
