= Ekta Nagar–Rewa Mahamana Express =

Train in India

Overview
- Service type: Mahamana Express
- First service: Inaugural :- 9 March 2019; 7 years ago; Extension :- 17 January 2021; 5 years ago (extended upto Ekta Nagar)
- Current operator: Western Railway

Route
- Termini: Ekta Nagar (EKNR); Rewa (REWA)
- Stops: 16
- Distance travelled: 1,339 km (832 mi)
- Average journey time: 22 hrs 20 mins
- Service frequency: Weekly (Note: Runs one day in a week for every direction.)
- Train number: 20905 / 20906

On-board services
- Classes: AC First Class, AC 2 Tier, AC 3 Tier, Sleeper Class, General Unreserved
- Seating arrangements: Yes
- Sleeping arrangements: Yes
- Catering facilities: Available
- Observation facilities: Large windows
- Baggage facilities: No
- Other facilities: Below the seats

Technical
- Rolling stock: LHB coach
- Track gauge: 1,676 mm (5 ft 6 in)
- Operating speed: 60 km/h (37 mph) average including halts.

The 20905 / 20906 Ekta Nagar–Rewa Mahamana Express is a Superfast train belonging to Western Railway zone that runs between Ekta Nagar and Rewa in India.

It is currently being operated with 20905/20906 train numbers on a weekly basis.

== Coach composition ==
The train has LHB rakes with a maximum speed of 110 km/h. The train consists of 23 coaches:

- 1 First AC
- 2 AC II Tier
- 5 AC III Tier
- 8 Sleeper coaches
- 1 Pantry car
- 4 General Unreserved
- 2 EOG cum Luggage Rake

== Service ==
20905/Ekta Nagar – Rewa Mahamana Express has an average speed of 60 km/h and covers 1339 km in 22 hrs 20 mins.

20906/Rewa – Ekta Nagar Mahamana Express has an average speed of 65 km/h and covers 1339 km in 20 hrs 45 mins.

== Route and halts ==
The important halts of the train are:

- Ekta Nagar
- Vadodara
- Bharuch Junction
- Surat
- Amalner
- Jalgaon Junction
- Bhusaval Junction
- Khandwa Junction
- Itarsi Junction
- Pipariya
- Gadarwara
- Narsinghpur
- Jabalpur Junction
- Katni Junction
- Maihar
- Satna Junction
- Rewa

== Traction ==
Both trains are hauled by a Vadodara Loco Shed-based WAP-7 or WAP-5 (HOG)-equipped locomotive from Ekta Nagar to Rewa and vice versa.

== Rake sharing ==
The train shares its rake with 20903/20904 Ekta Nagar–Varanasi Mahamana Express.

== See also ==
- Ekta Nagar railway station
- Rewa railway station
- Mahamana Express
