= Ekta Nagar–Hazrat Nizamuddin Gujarat Sampark Kranti Express =

Train in India

Ekta Nagar–Hazrat Nizamuddin Gujarat SF Express

Overview
- First service: 17 January 2021; 5 years ago
- Current operator: Western Railway

Route
- Termini: Ekta Nagar (EKNR); Hazrat Nizamuddin (NZM)
- Stops: 9
- Distance travelled: 1,069 km (664 mi)
- Average journey time: 14 hrs 15 mins
- Service frequency: Bi-Weekly
- Train number: 20945 / 20946

On-board services
- Classes: AC 2 tier, AC 3 tier, Sleeper class, General Unreserved
- Seating arrangements: Yes
- Sleeping arrangements: Yes
- Catering facilities: Available
- Observation facilities: Large windows
- Baggage facilities: Available
- Other facilities: Below the seats

Technical
- Rolling stock: LHB coach
- Track gauge: 1,676 mm (5 ft 6 in)
- Operating speed: 70 km/h (43 mph) average including halts

The 20945 / 20946 Ekta Nagar–Hazrat Nizamuddin SF Express is a Superfast train belonging to Western Railway zone that runs between Ekta Nagar and Hazrat Nizamuddin in India. It is currently being operated with 20945/20946 train numbers on bi-weekly basis. It is no more Sampark Kranti. Since August 2025, it is a Superfast train.

== Coach composition ==
The train has LHB rakes with max speed of 110 kmph. The train consists of 22 coaches:

- 1 AC II Tier
- 3 AC III Tier
- 12 Sleeper coaches
- 4 General Unreserved
- 1 Pantry Car
- 1 EOG cum Luggage Rake

== Service ==
20945/Ekta Nagar - Hazrat Nizamuddin SF Express has an average speed of 74 km/h and covers 1069 km in 14 hrs 25 mins.

20946/Hazrat Nizamuddin - Ekta Nagar SF Express has an average speed of 77 km/h and covers 1069 km in 13 hrs 55 mins.

== Route and halts ==
The important halts of the train are:

- Ekta Nagar
- Vadodara Junction
- Godhra Junction
- Dahod
- Ratlam Junction
- Kota Junction
- Mathura Junction
- Hazrat Nizamuddin

== Traction ==
earlier was WAP-5. Both trains are hauled by a Vadodara Loco Shed-based WAP-7 (HOG)-equipped locomotive from Ekta Nagar to Hazrat Nizamuddin and vice versa.

== Rake sharing ==
No Rake sharing.

== See also ==
- Ekta Nagar railway station
- Hazrat Nizamuddin railway station
