= Chandod =

Village in Gujarat, India

Coordinates: 21°59′N 73°27′E

- Interactive map of Chandod
- Country: India
- State: Gujarat
- District: Vadodara
- Taluk: Dabhoi

Chandod or Chanod is a village in Dabhoi taluka, Vadodara district, in the Indian state of Gujarat.

== Geography ==
It is located at the convergence of the Narmada, Orsang, and Saraswati rivers. The village is considered sacred by many and includes temples such as the Kapileshwar Mahadev, Seshasinarayan Mandir, Pingleshwar Mahadev, Kashi Vishwanath Mahadev.

Totapuri was at Karnali, near Narmada river, village Chandod, Vadodara, Gujarat for forty years and gained Nirvikalpa Samadhi. He was typical Paramahamsa (the highest order of the Monk in Dashnami Order). It is a major pilgrim site of Hindus for performing last rites for their dead.

== Demographics ==
According to the 2001 census of India, the total population of the village was 3019: 1530 males and 1489 females.
