= Ekta Nagar–Varanasi Mahamana Express =

Train in India

Overview
- Service type: Mahamana Express
- First service: Inaugural :- 22 September 2017; 8 years ago; Extension :- 17 January 2021; 5 years ago (extended upto Ekta Nagar)
- Current operator: Western Railway

Route
- Termini: Ekta Nagar (EKNR); Varanasi (BSB)
- Stops: 11
- Distance travelled: 1,616 km (1,004 mi)
- Average journey time: 26 hours 15 minutes
- Service frequency: Weekly (Note: Runs one day in a week for every direction.)
- Train number: 20903 / 20904

On-board services
- Classes: AC First Class, AC 2 Tier, AC 3 Tier, Sleeper Class, General Unreserved
- Seating arrangements: Yes
- Sleeping arrangements: Yes
- Catering facilities: Available
- Observation facilities: Large windows
- Baggage facilities: No
- Other facilities: Below the seats

Technical
- Rolling stock: LHB coach
- Track gauge: 1,676 mm (5 ft 6 in)
- Operating speed: 57 km/h (35 mph) average including halts.

The 20903 / 20904 Ekta Nagar–Varanasi Mahamana Express is an Superfast Express train belonging to Western Railway zone that runs between Ekta Nagar and Varanasi Junction in India. It is currently being operated with 20903/20904 train numbers on a weekly basis.

== Coach composition ==
The train has LHB rakes with a maximum speed of 130 km/h. The train consists of 24 coaches:

- 1 First AC
- 2 AC II Tier
- 6 AC III Tier
- 8 Sleeper coaches
- 1 Pantry car
- 4 General Unreserved
- 2 EOG cum Luggage Rake

== Service ==
20903/Ekta Nagar – Varanasi Mahamana Express has an average speed of 58 km/h and covers 1531 km in 26 hrs 35 mins.

20904/Varanasi – Ekta Nagar Mahamana Express has an average speed of 59 km/h and covers 1531 km in 25 hrs 50 mins.

== Route and halts ==
The important halts of the train are:

- Ekta Nagar
- Vadodara
- Bharuch Junction
- Surat
- Nandurbar
- Amalner
- Bhusaval Junction
- Itarsi Junction
- Jabalpur Junction
- Katni Junction
- Satna Junction
- Prayagraj Chheoki Junction
- Varanasi

== Traction ==
earlier was WDG-4. Both trains are hauled by a Vadodara Loco Shed-based WAP-7 (HOG)-equipped locomotive from Ekta Nagar to Varanasi and vice versa.

== Rake sharing ==
The train shares its rake with 20905/20906 Ekta Nagar–Rewa Mahamana Express.

== See also ==
- Ekta Nagar railway station
- Varanasi Junction railway station
- Mahamana Express
