= Ratlam–Laxmibai Nagar DEMU =

Laxmibai Nagar–Ratlam DEMU
Overview
- Service type: passenger
- Locale: Madhya Pradesh
- First service: 2015
- Current operator: Western Railway

Route
- Termini: Laxmibai Nagar Junction; Ratlam Junction
- Stops: 14
- Distance travelled: 115 km (71 mi)
- Average journey time: 2h 40m
- Service frequency: Daily
- Train number: 79311UP / 79312DN

On-board services
- Classes: First class, sleeper 3 tier, unreserved
- Seating arrangements: Yes
- Sleeping arrangements: Yes

Technical
- Track gauge: 5 ft 6 in (1,676 mm)
- Operating speed: 45 km/h (28 mph) average with halts

Laxmibai Nagar–Ratlam DEMU is a passenger train of the Indian Railways, which runs between Laxmibai Nagar Junction railway station and Ratlam Junction railway station, both within Madhya Pradesh.

== Arrival and departure ==
- Train no. 79312 departs from Laxmibai Nagar, daily at 06:45, reaching Ratlam the same day at 09:20.
- Train no. 79311 departs from Ratlam daily at 19:00. from platform no. 1 reaching Laxmibai Nagar the same day at 21:40.

== Route and halts ==
The train goes via Fatehabad Chandrawatiganj Junction. The important halts of the train are:

- Laxmibai Nagar Junction
- Palia railway station
- Balauda Takun railway station
- Ajnod railway station
- Fatehabad Chandrawatiganj Junction
- Osra railway station
- Gautampura Road railway station
- Pirjhalar railway station
- Barnagar railway station
- Sunderabad railway station
- Runija railway station
- Pritam Nagar railway station
- Nauganwan railway station
- Ratlam Junction

== Average speed and frequency ==
The train runs with an average speed of 44 km/h and completes 115 km in 2 hrs 35 mim. The train runs on a daily basis.
