= Indore–Ratlam DEMU =

Train in India

Ratlam–Indore DMU
Overview
- Service type: Passenger
- Locale: Madhya Pradesh
- First service: 2015
- Current operator: Western Railway

Route
- Termini: Indore Junction railway station Ratlam Junction railway station
- Stops: 13
- Distance travelled: 115 km (71 mi)
- Average journey time: 2h 40m
- Service frequency: Daily
- Train number: 79305UP / 79306DN

On-board services
- Class: DMU
- Seating arrangements: Yes
- Sleeping arrangements: Yes

Technical
- Track gauge: BG
- Operating speed: 44 km/h (27 mph) average with halts

Indore–Ratlam DEMU is a passenger train of the Indian Railways, which runs between Indore Junction railway station of Madhya Pradesh and Ratlam Junction railway station of Madhya Pradesh.

In April 2016, it was announced that the train will be extended to Mhow once the Commissioner Railway Safety clears the Indore–Mhow line as the station can hold only 16 coaches.

== Arrival and departure ==
- Train no.79312 departs from Indore, daily at 08:50, reaching Ratlam the same day at 11:30.
- Train no.79311 departs from Ratlam daily at 18:00. from platform no.1 reaching Laxmibai Nagar the same day at 20:40.

== Route and halts ==
The train goes via Fatehabad Chandrawatiganj Junction. The important halts of the train are:

- Indore Junction
- Laxmibai Nagar Junction
- Palia railway station
- Balauda Takun railway station
- Ajnod railway station
- Fatehabad Chandrawatiganj Junction
- Osra railway station
- Gautampura Road railway station
- Pirjhalar railway station
- Barnagar railway station
- Sunderabad railway station
- Runija railway station
- Pritam Nagar railway station
- Nauganwan railway station
- Ratlam Junction

== Average speed and frequency ==
The train runs with an average speed of 44 km/h and completes 119 km in 2 hours 40 minutes. The train runs on a daily basis.
