= Manglia Gaon railway station =

Railway station in Madhya Pradesh

Manglia Gaon

General information
- Location: Manglia, Indore; India
- Coordinates: 22.8105°N 75.9149°E
- Elevation: 557 m (1,827 ft)
- System: Express train and Passenger train station
- Owner: Indian Railways
- Operator: Ratlam railway division
- Line: Indore-Gwalior line
- Platforms: 3
- Tracks: 5

Construction
- Structure type: Standard (on ground station)
- Parking: Available
- Cycle facilities: Available
- Accessible: Disabled access

Other information
- Status: Active
- Station code: MGG
- Fare zone: Western Railways

Services
Preceding station	Indian Railways	Following station
Laxmibai Nagar Junction towards ?	Western Railway zone Indore-Gwalior line	Dakacha towards ?
Location
- Interactive map

Manglia Gaon railway station (station code: MGG) is one of the local railway stations in Indore City. The railway station of Manglia Gaon is located on a broad gauge line. Its route is connected with Ujjain Junction to the northwest, Indore Junction to the south, Dewas Junction to the north. It is connected to Bhopal, Ujjain, Gwalior, Jaipur, Jabalpur, Ratlam.

== Developments ==
The station has been developed as an alternative to Laxmibai Nagar railway station as the new freight station. Two new platforms have been built and new tracks have been laid down. Elevation of the current platform is also increased and new shed are installed.

== Trains ==
The following trains stop at Manglia Gaon railway station:

- 19711/19712 Indore - Jaipur Express Via. Ajmer
- 18233/18234 Narmada Express between Indore and Bilaspur
- 59379/59380 Indore – Maksi Passenger (UnReserved)
- 59307/59308 Indore – Ujjain Passenger
- 79312/79311 Laxmibai Nagar - Ratlam DEMU
- 59388/59388 Indore - Nagda Passenger (UnReserved)
- 79305/79305 Ratlam - Indore DMU

== See also ==
- Indore Junction
- Ujjain Junction
