= Ratlam–Gwalior Intercity Express =

Indian interstate railway

Ratlam - Gwalior Intercity Express
Overview
- Service type: Express
- Locale: Madhya Pradesh
- Current operator: North Central Railway

Route
- Termini: Ratlam Junction; Gwalior Junction
- Distance travelled: 680 km (420 mi)
- Average journey time: 14h 37m
- Service frequency: 4 Days
- Train number: 11125DN / 11166UP

On-board services
- Classes: AC 2 Tier, AC 3 Tier, Sleeper 3 Tier, Unreserved
- Seating arrangements: No
- Sleeping arrangements: Yes
- Catering facilities: E-Catering
- Entertainment facilities: No
- Baggage facilities: No

Technical
- Rolling stock: 2
- Track gauge: 1,676 mm (5 ft 6 in)
- Operating speed: 47 km/h (29 mph) average with halts

The Ratlam – Gwalior Intercity Express is an intercity train service which runs between Ratlam Junction railway station of Ratlam of Central Indian state of Madhya Pradesh and Gwalior Junction railway station of Gwalior, the important city of the madhya pradesh .

== Number and nomenclature ==
The number provided for the service is

- 11125 - From Ratlam to Gwalior
- 11126 - From Gwalior to Ratlam

== Arrival and departure ==
- Train no.11125 departs from Ratlam Sunday, Monday, Wednesday and Thursday at 17:10 hrs. reaching Gwalior the day following the next day at 7:47 hrs.
- Train no.11126 departs from Gwalior Monday, Tuesday, Thursday and Friday at 19:30 hrs., reaching Ratlam the day following next day at 10:45 hrs.

== Route and halts ==
The train goes via Barnagar, Indore, Dewas, Ujjain, Maksi, Guna and Shivpuri.

The important halts of the train are:

- Ratlam Junction
- Badnagar
- Fatehabad Chandrawatiganj Junction
- Indore Junction
- Dewas Junction
- Ujjain Junction
- Shajapur
- Maksi Junction
- Biyavra Rajgarh
- Ruthiyai Junction
- Guna Junction
- Badarwas
- Shivpuri
- Gwalior Junction

== Coach composite ==
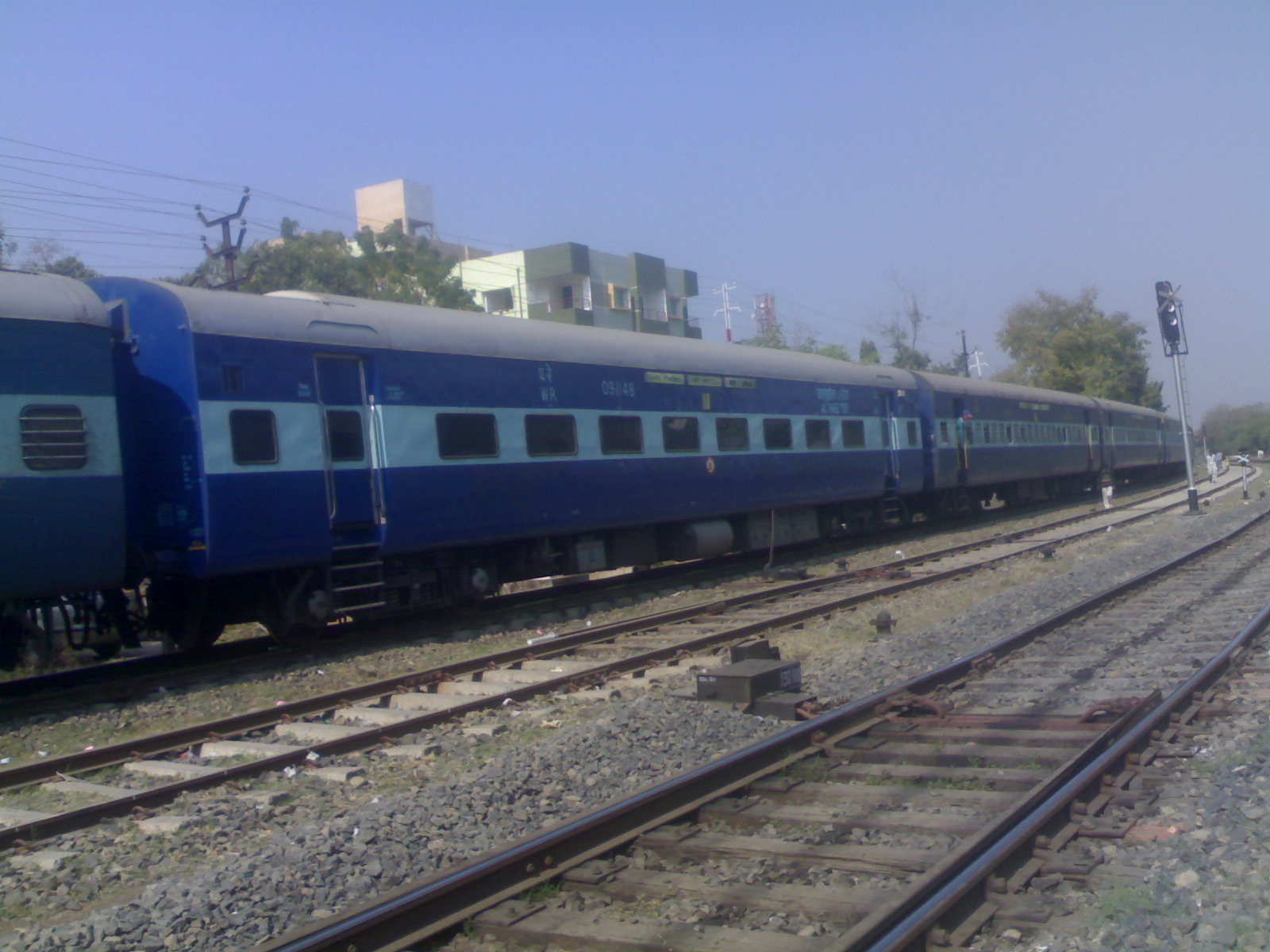
An AC Coach of the train

The train generally consist of 19 Coaches as follows :

- 1 AC 2 Tier
- 4 AC 3 Tier
- 8 Sleeper Coach
- 4 Second Class Coaches
- 2 Luggage cum Parcel

	1A	2A	FC	3A	CC	SL	2S	UR
Number of Coaches	-	1	-	4	-	8	-	4

== Average speed and frequency ==
The train runs with an average speed of 46 km/h. The train runs on 4 days in a week.

== Rake sharing ==
The train shares its rake with 21125/21126 Ratlam - Bhind Express

== See also ==
- Ratlam - Bhind Express
- Bhopal–Gwalior Intercity Express
- Indore–Amritsar Express
- Indore - Bhopal Intercity Express
