= Bhind railway station =

Railway station in Madhya Pradesh, India

Bhind Railway Station Bhind Railway station भिंड रेलवे स्टेशन

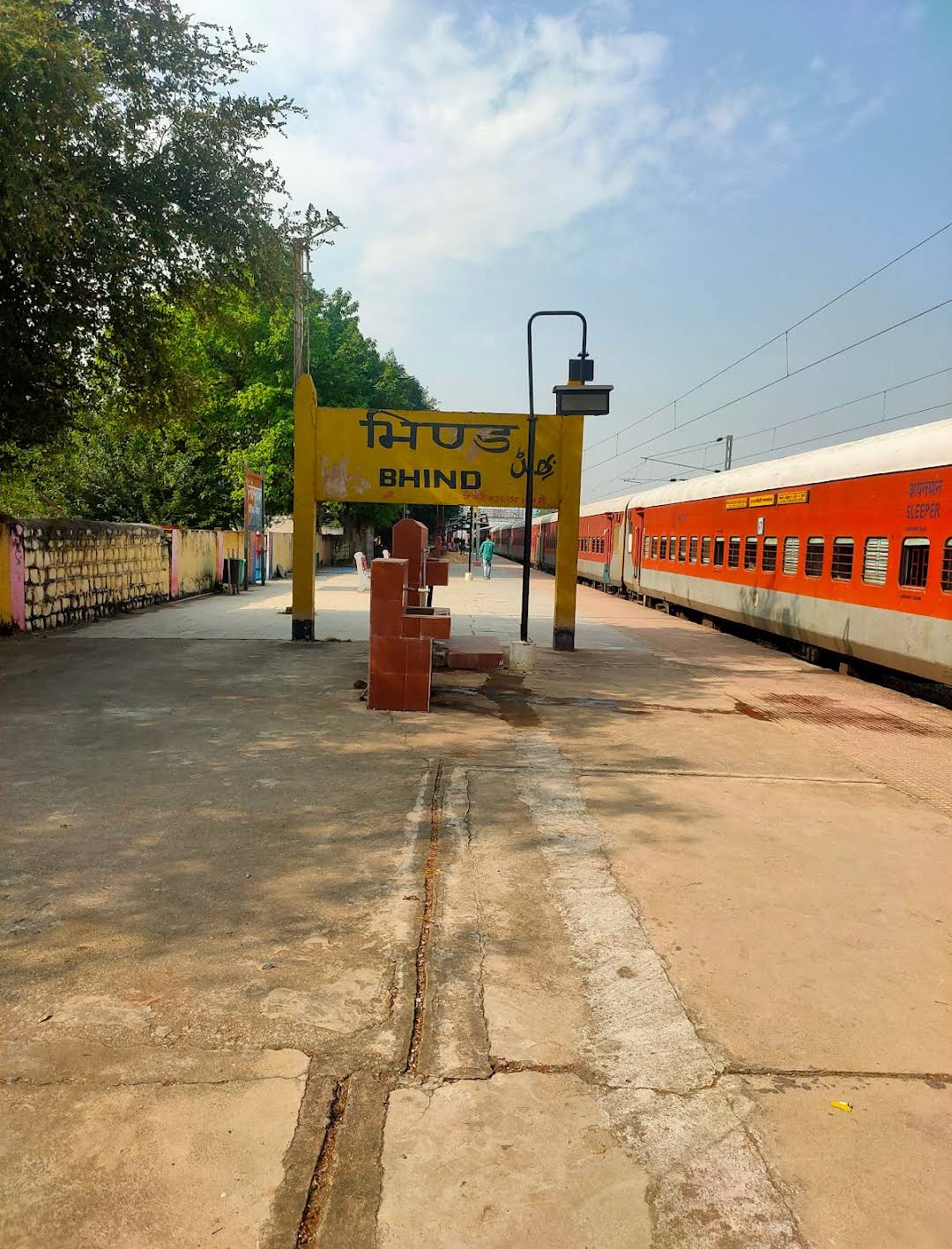
- Intercity Express Standing on Bhind Railway Station

General information
- Location: Bhind, Madhya Pradesh; India
- Coordinates: 26°35′19″N 78°46′38″E
- System: Indian Railways station
- Owner: Indian Railways
- Operator: North Central Railway
- Line: Gwalior–Etawah line
- Platforms: 3
- Tracks: 3

Construction
- Structure type: Standard (on ground)
- Parking: Yes
- Cycle facilities: Yes

Other information
- Status: Functioning
- Station code: BIX
- Zone(s): North Central Railway
- Division(s): Jhansi
- Fare zone: North Central Railway
Location
- Location within India Location within Madhya Pradesh

Bhind railway station is a railway station in Bhind city of Madhya Pradesh. Its code is BIX. It serves Bhind city. The station consists of three platforms. Passenger, Express and Superfast trains halt here.

== Major trains ==
- 19811 : Kota-Etawah Express
- 19812 : Etawah-Kota Express
- 11903 : VGLB-Etawah Express
- 11904 : Etawah-VGLB Express
- 21125 : Ratlam-Bhind Express
- 21126 : Bhind-Ratlam Express
- 20961 : UDN-BSBS SF Express
- 20962 : BSBS-UDN SF Express
- 01887 : Gwalior-Etawah Passenger
- 01888 : Etawah–Gwalior Passenger
- 01889 : Gwalior-Bhind Passenger
- 01890 : Bhind–Gwalior Passenger
- 01891 : Gwalior-Etawah MEMU
- 01892 : Etawah-Gwalior MEMU
