= Silakheri railway station =

Railway station in Madhya Pradesh, India

Silakheri

General information
- Location: National Highway 3, Chhota Mahalasapura, Dewas district, Madhya Pradesh; India
- Coordinates: 23°05′35″N 76°03′26″E
- System: Passenger train station
- Owner: Indian Railways
- Operator: Western Railway
- Line: Indore–Gwalior line
- Platforms: 1
- Tracks: 1

Construction
- Structure type: Standard (on ground station)

Other information
- Status: Active
- Station code: SKBN
- Zone(s): Western Railway zone
- Division(s): Ratlam

History
- Opened: 1899
- Former names: Gwalior Light Railway

Services
| Preceding station | Indian Railways | Following station |
|---|---|---|
| Ranyal Jasmiya towards ? | Western Railway zone Indore–Gwalior line | Ajitkheri towards ? |
Location

Silakheri railway station is an Indian railway station on the Indore–Gwalior line under the Ratlam railway division of Western Railway zone. This is situated beside National Highway 3 at Chhota Mahalasapura in Dewas district of the Indian state of Madhya Pradesh.
