= Ajitkheri railway station =

Railway station in Madhya Pradesh, India

Ajitkheri

General information
- Location: Ajitkheri, Dewas, Dewas district, Madhya Pradesh; India
- Coordinates: 23°02′23″N 76°02′43″E
- Elevation: 532 m (1,745 ft)
- System: Passenger train station
- Owner: Indian Railways
- Operator: Western Railway
- Line: Indore–Gwalior line
- Platforms: 1
- Tracks: 1

Construction
- Structure type: Standard (on ground station)

Other information
- Status: Active
- Station code: AJKI
- Zone(s): Western Railway zone
- Division(s): Ratlam

History
- Opened: 1899
- Former names: Gwalior Light Railway

Services
| Preceding station | Indian Railways | Following station |
|---|---|---|
| Silakheri towards ? | Western Railway zone Indore–Gwalior line | Dewas Junction towards ? |
Location

Ajitkheri railway station is a railway station on the Indore–Gwalior line under the Ratlam railway division of the Western Railway zone in India. It is located at Ajitkheri, Dewas, in the Dewas district of Madhya Pradesh.
