= Indore–Delhi Sarai Rohilla Weekly Express =

Train in India

Indore - Delhi Sarai Rohilla Weekly Express
Overview
- Service type: Express
- Locale: Madhya Pradesh, Rajasthan, Haryana & Delhi
- First service: January 18, 2019; 6 years ago
- Current operator(s): Western Railways

Route
- Termini: Indore Junction (INDB); Delhi Sarai Rohilla (DEE)
- Stops: 12
- Distance travelled: 933 km (580 mi)
- Average journey time: 17 hours 55 minutes
- Service frequency: Weekly (Note: Runs one day in a week for every direction.)
- Train number(s): 19337 / 19338

On-board services
- Class(es): AC 2 Tier, AC 3 Tier, Sleeper class, General Unreserved
- Seating arrangements: Yes
- Sleeping arrangements: Yes
- Catering facilities: Available
- Observation facilities: Large windows
- Baggage facilities: Available

Technical
- Rolling stock: LHB coach
- Track gauge: 1,676 mm (5 ft 6 in)
- Operating speed: 51 km/h (32 mph) average with halts

The 19337 / 19338 Indore - Delhi Sarai Rohilla Weekly Express is an express train of the Indian Railways, running between Indore Junction and Delhi Sarai Rohilla. It is currently being operated with 19337/19338 train numbers on a weekly basis.

== Coach composition ==
The train has standard LHB rakes with max speed of 110 kmph. The train consists of 20 coaches:

- 2 AC II Tier
- 4 AC III Tier
- 7 Sleeper class
- 4 General Unreserved
- 1 Pantry car
- 2 End-on Generator

== Service ==
- 19337/Indore–Delhi Sarai Rohilla Weekly Express has an average speed of 52 km/h and covers 933 km in 17 hrs 55 mins.
- 19338/Delhi Sarai Rohilla–Indore Weekly Express has an average speed of 50 km/h and covers 933 km in 18 hrs 35 mins.

== Route and halts ==
The important halts of the train are:

- Indore Junction
- Fatehabad Chandrawatiganj Junction
- Badnagar
- Ratlam Junction
- Mandsaur
- Neemuch
- Chittaurgarh Junction
- Bhilwara
- Ajmer Junction
- Jaipur Junction
- Dausa
- Alwar Junction
- Rewari Junction
- Delhi Sarai Rohilla

== Schedule ==
Train number	Station code	Departure station	Departure time	Departure day	Arrival station	Arrival time	Arrival day
19337	INDB	Indore Junction	19:20 PM	Sun	Delhi Sarai Rohilla	13:15 PM	Mon
19338	DEE	Delhi Sarai Rohilla	15:00 PM	Mon	Indore Junction	09:35 AM	Tue

== Rake sharing ==
The train shares its rake with 19331/19332 Kochuveli–Indore Weekly Express.

== Traction ==
Both trains are hauled by a Vadodara based WAP 7 locomotive from Indore Junction to Delhi Sarai Rohilla and vice versa.

== See also ==
- Indore–New Delhi Intercity Express
