= INA Colony =

- Neighborhood of Delhi
- Location in Delhi, India
- Coordinates: 28.5756°N 77.2097°E
- Country: India
- State: Delhi
- Metro: New Delhi

Languages
  - Official: Hindi
- Time zone: UTC+5:30 (IST)
- PIN: 110023

INA colony is a residential colony in South Delhi, New Delhi, India.

Situated on Aurobindo Marg, across Dilli Haat and behind INA Market, the colony lies near Safdarjung Airport, on Sri Aurobindo Marg, Kotla Mubarakpur opposite to Laxmibai Nagar adjacent to Kidwai Nagar East. The INA market also has shops selling varieties of imported foodstuff and wines for expatriates due to its proximity to Chanakyapuri diplomatic enclave.

Starting 2010, it is serviced by the Dilli Haat - INA underground station of the Delhi Metro.

== Location ==
The colony is located in South Delhi between Ring Road and Ring Railway. It lies on the eastern side of Sri Aurobindo Marg, opposite to Laxmi Bai Nagar.

Nearby landmarks include:

- Safdarjung Terminal
- Dilli Haat, AIIMS
- Safdarjung Hospital
- Safdarjung Airport
- Lodhi Colony Railway Station

INA colony is located at 28.576278°N 77.212032°E

== Size ==
This colony comprises two pockets - A & B, and has five types of flats, viz

Type	Block
I,	A
II,	C
III,	B
IV,	D
V,	E

Approximately 1000 flats in total are located.

== Postal details ==
PIN code - 110 023 Post Office - Sarojini Nagar Nearest Police station Sarojini Nagar, Lodhi colony, Kotla Mubarakpur. Police Station Jurisdiction Kotla Mubarakpur.

== Facilities available ==
- Medical Centre
- Community centre
- Children Parks (3 nos) located in pkts A & B
- Transit Hostel
- Kendriya Bhandar
- Electrical & Civil Complaint cell
- Wellness centre
- Kalyanmayee office
- AAEU employee union office
- AAOA Office
- ACOA(I) office
- ATC guild office
- Gopal Mandir in pkt - A
- Gurudwara
- 5 gates equipped with 24 hour security guards posted.

== INA Consists of ==
- INA Colonies
- Kendriya Bhandar
- Two schools:- Kendriya Vidyalaya, INA Colony and Sarvodaya Vidyalaya, INA Colony, adjacent to each other and near Vikas sadan.
- One Montessori School:-MMI KALYANMAYEE, Pocket B, INA Colony
- DDA offices, also known as "Vikas Sadan"
- Central Vigilance Commission office, INA Colony

== Picture gallery ==
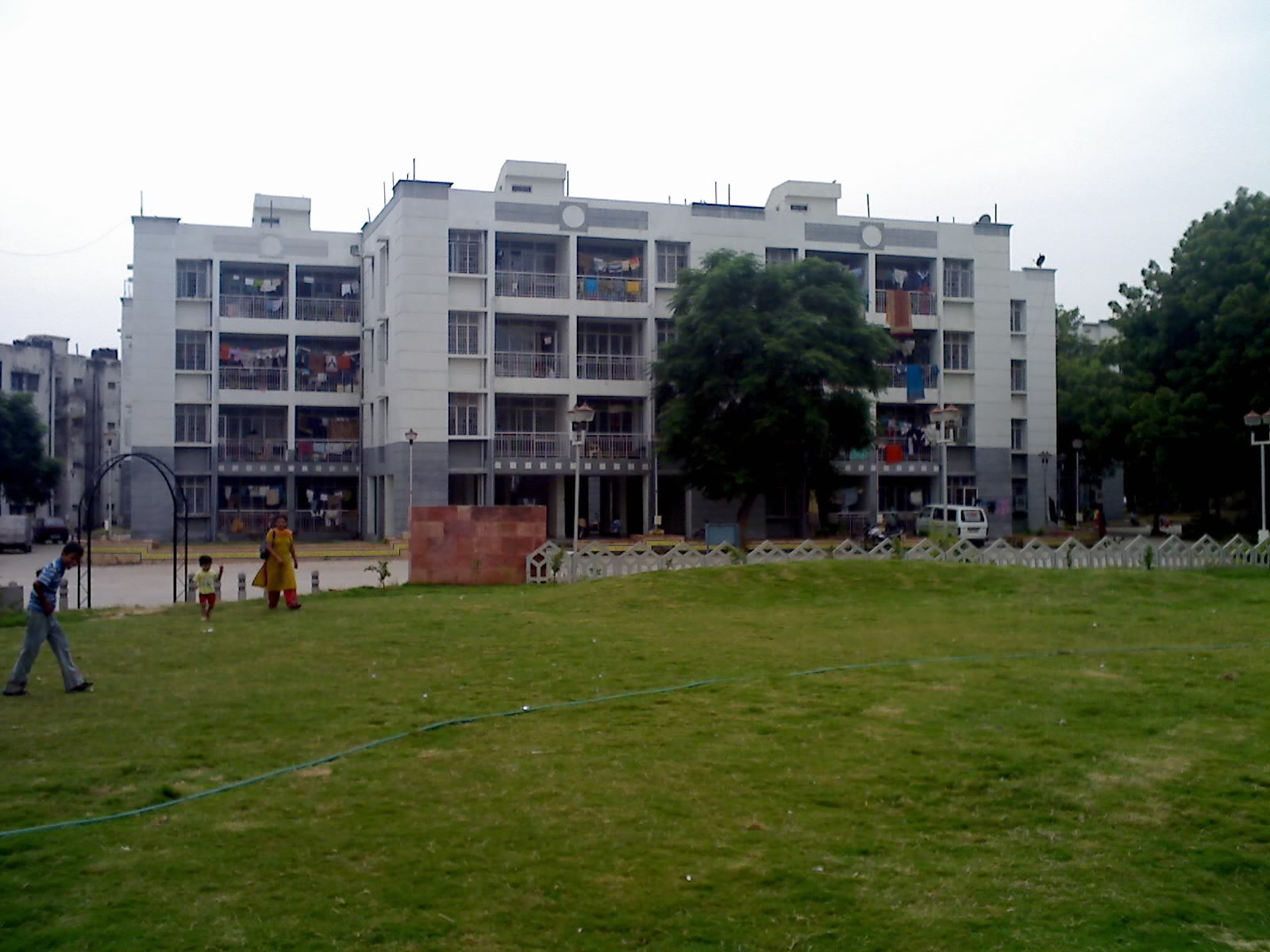

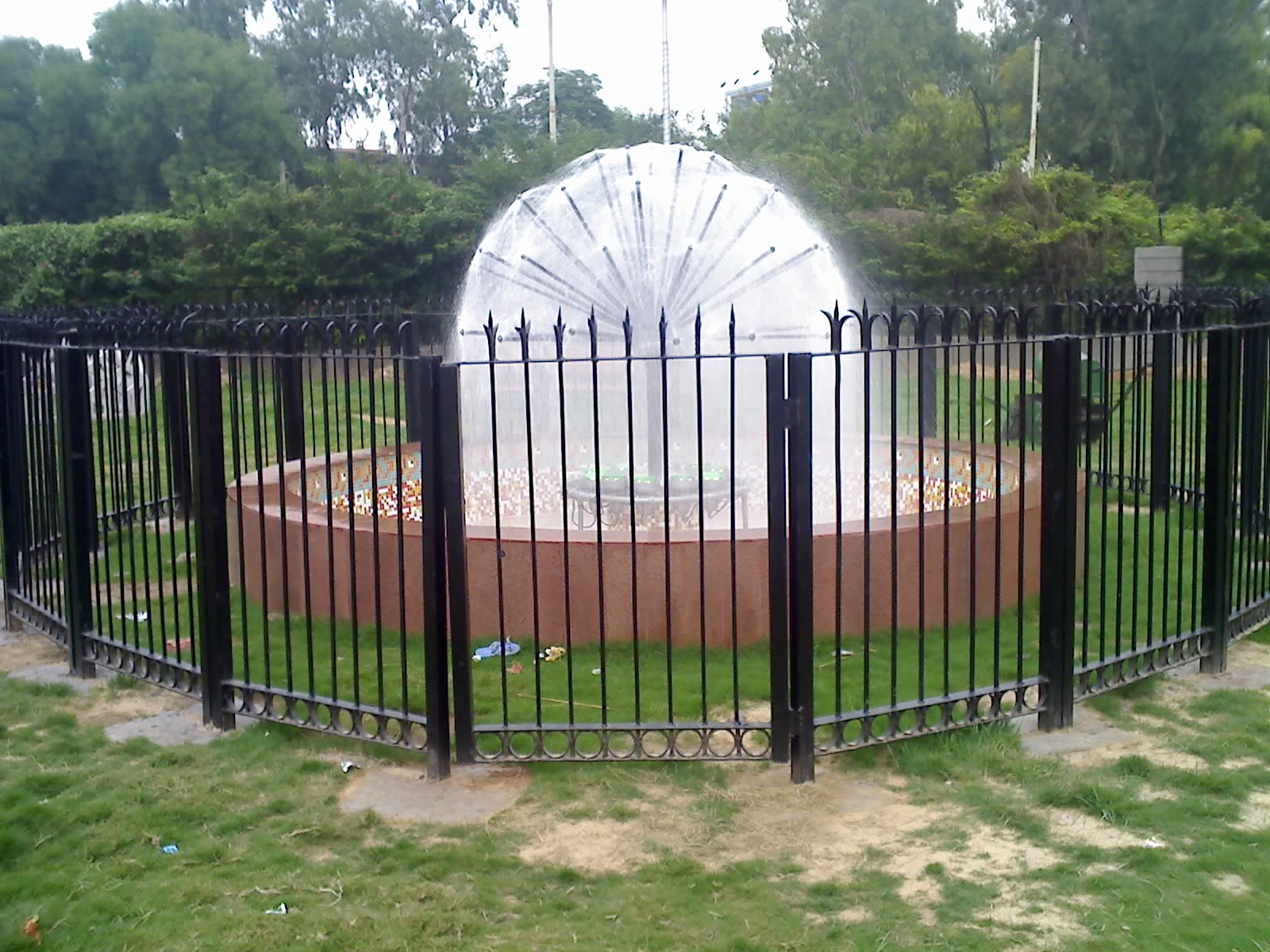

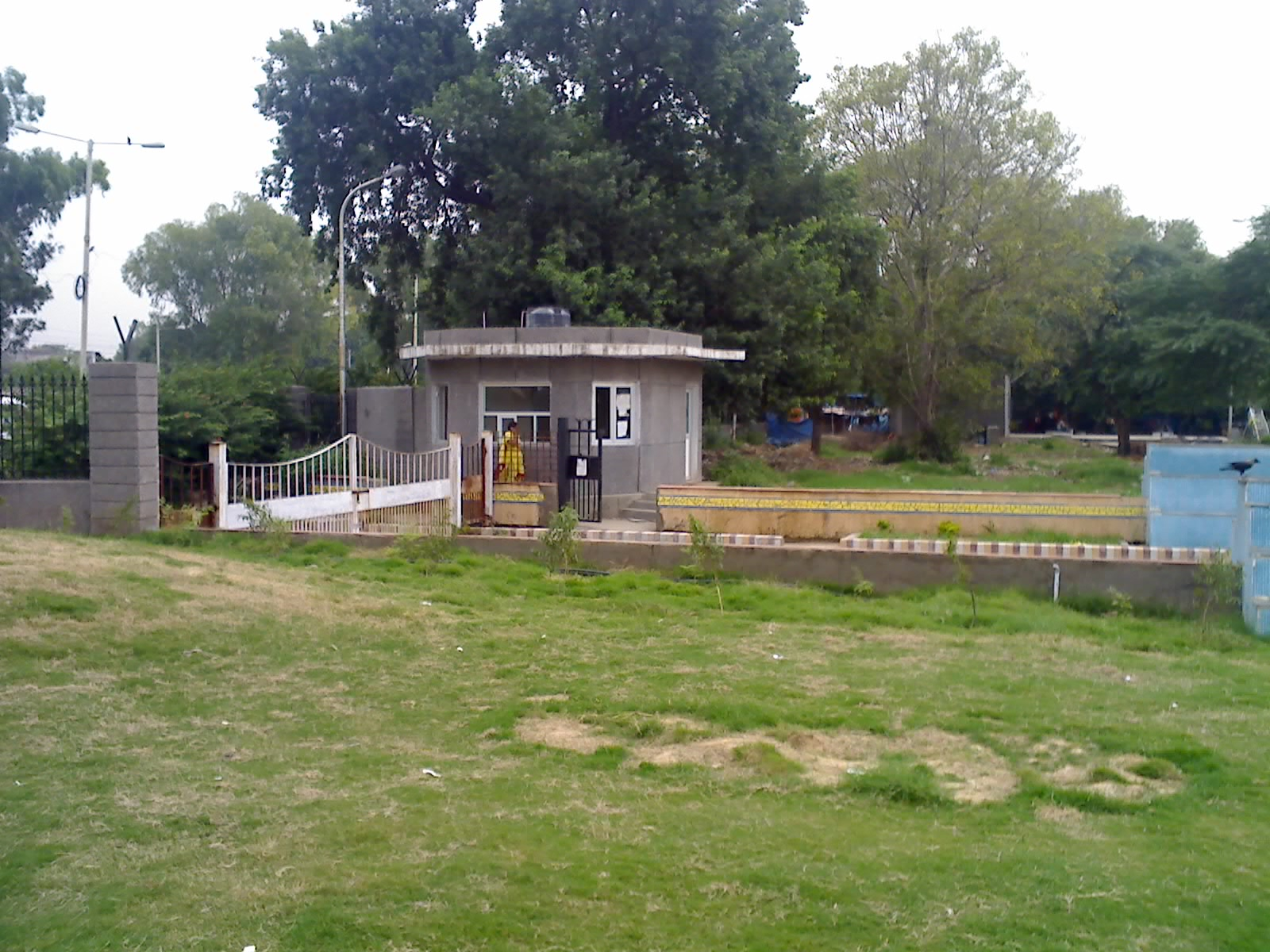

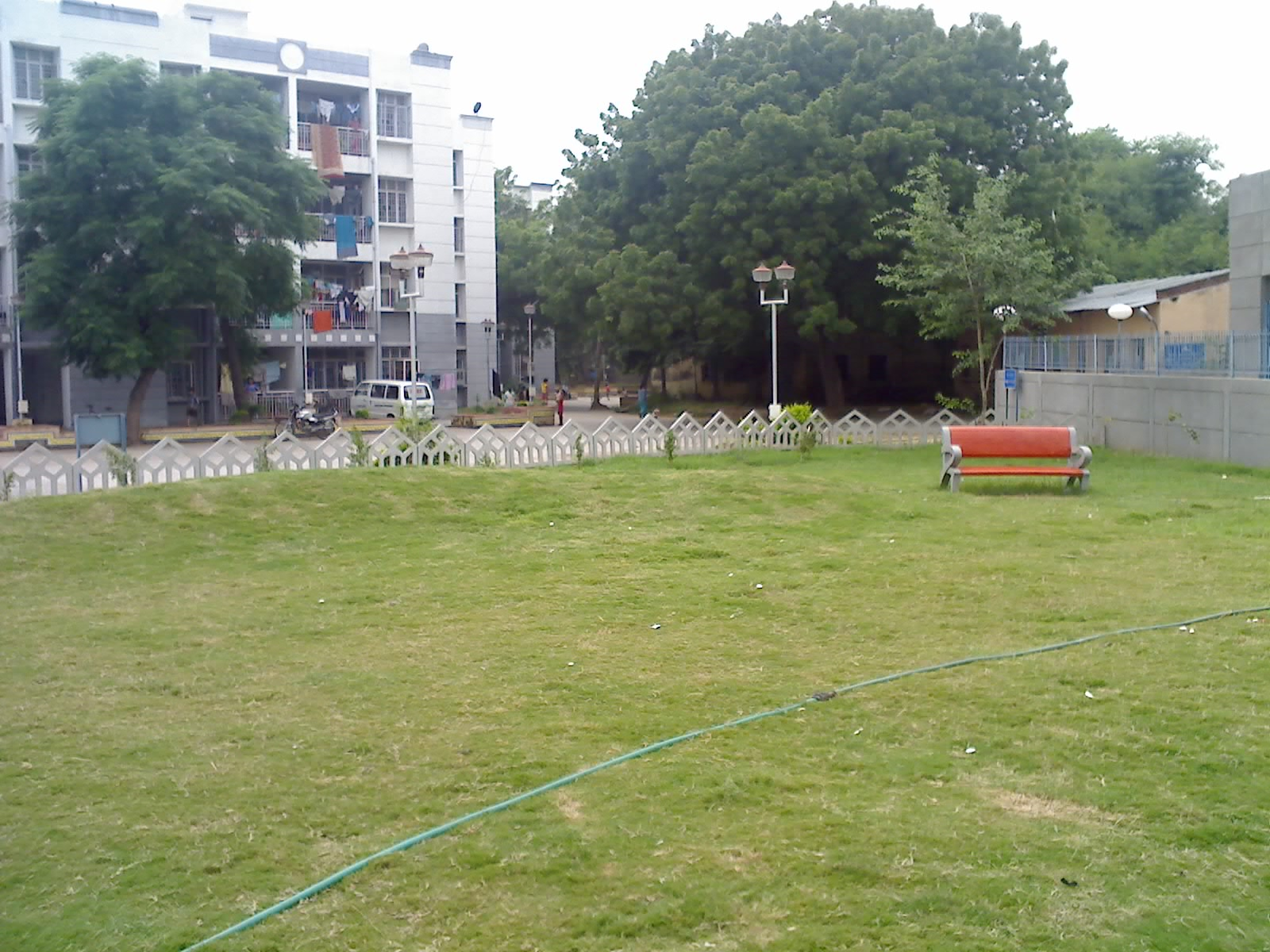

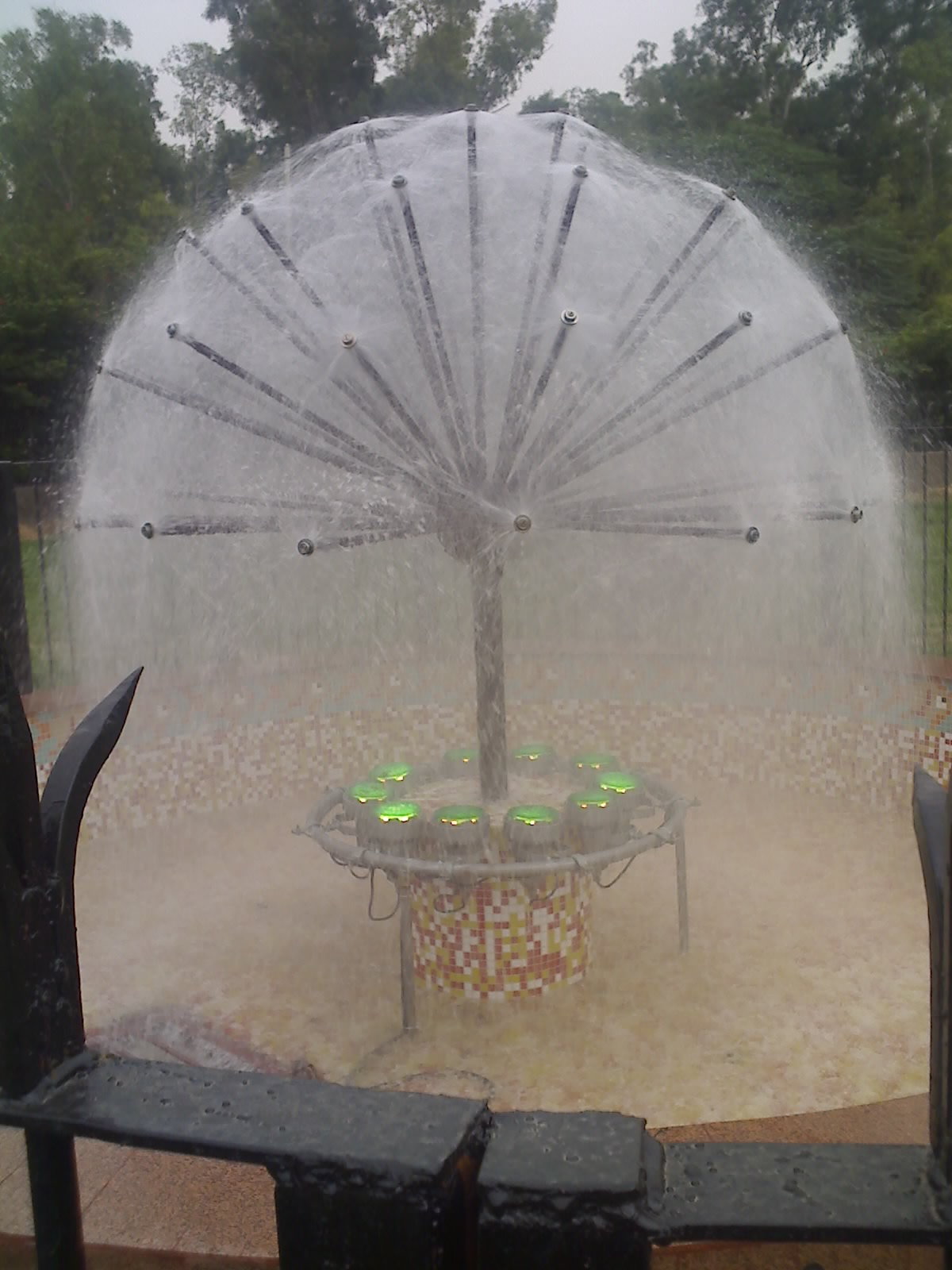

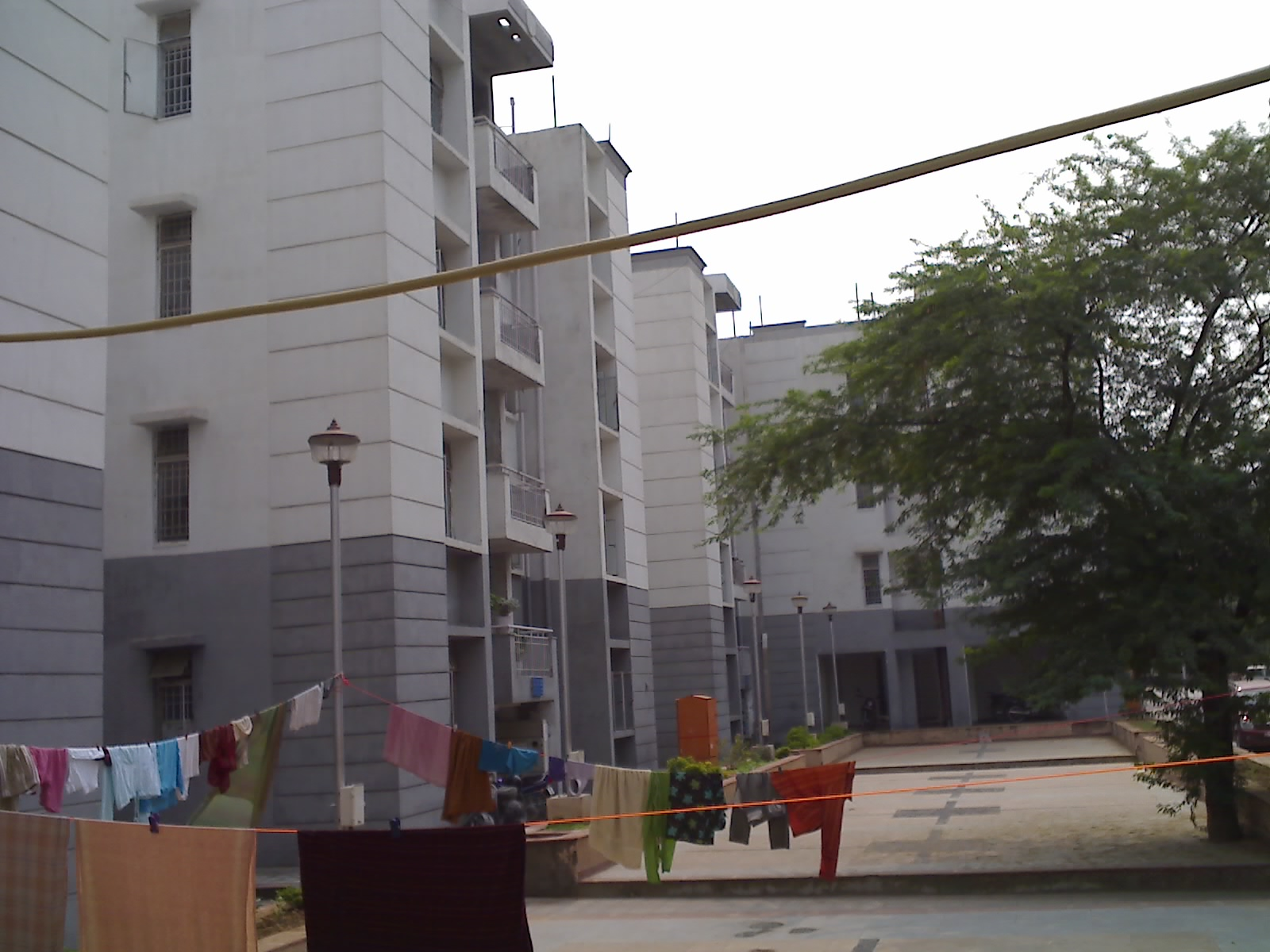

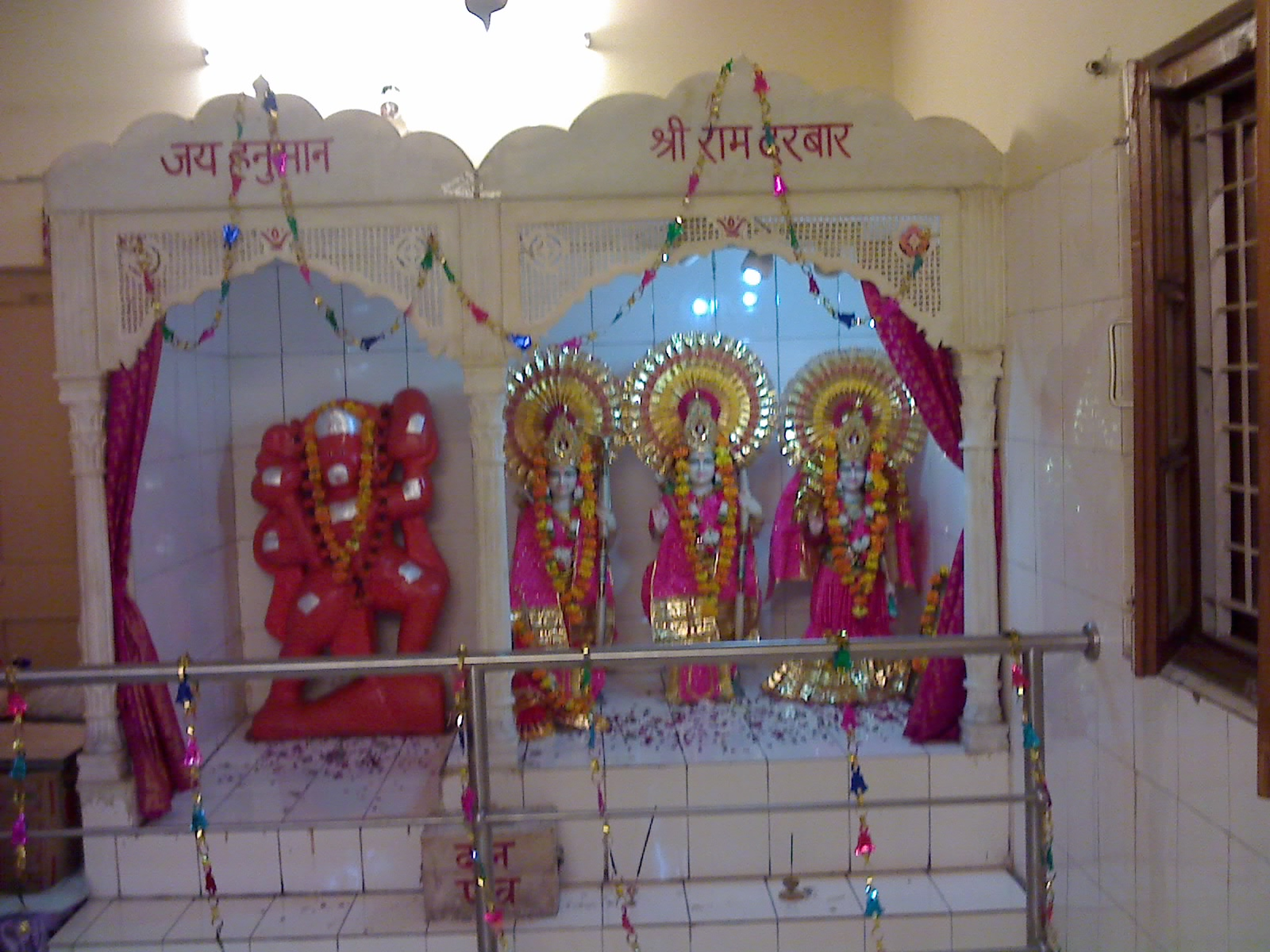
Gopal Mandir, at INA colony

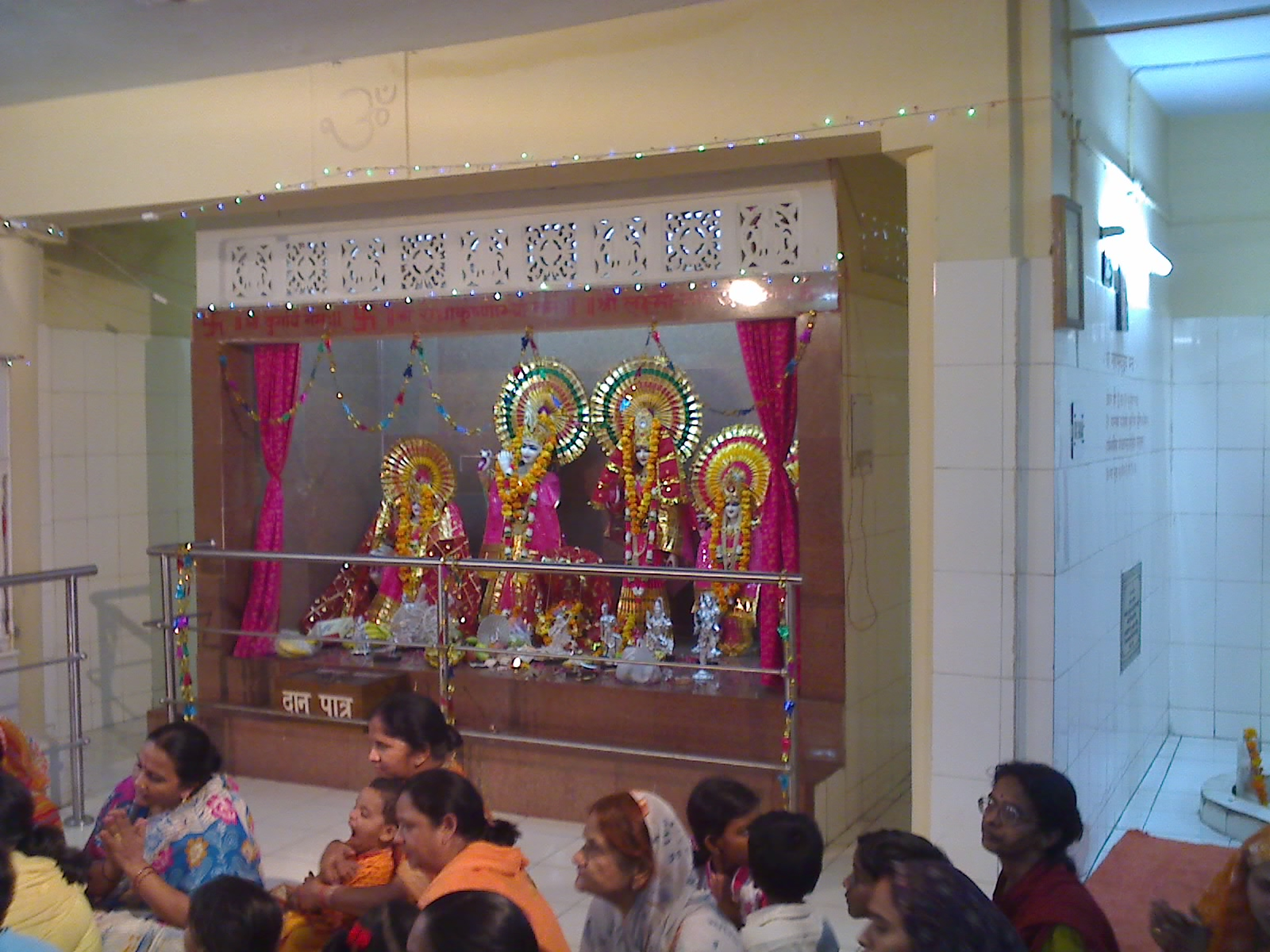

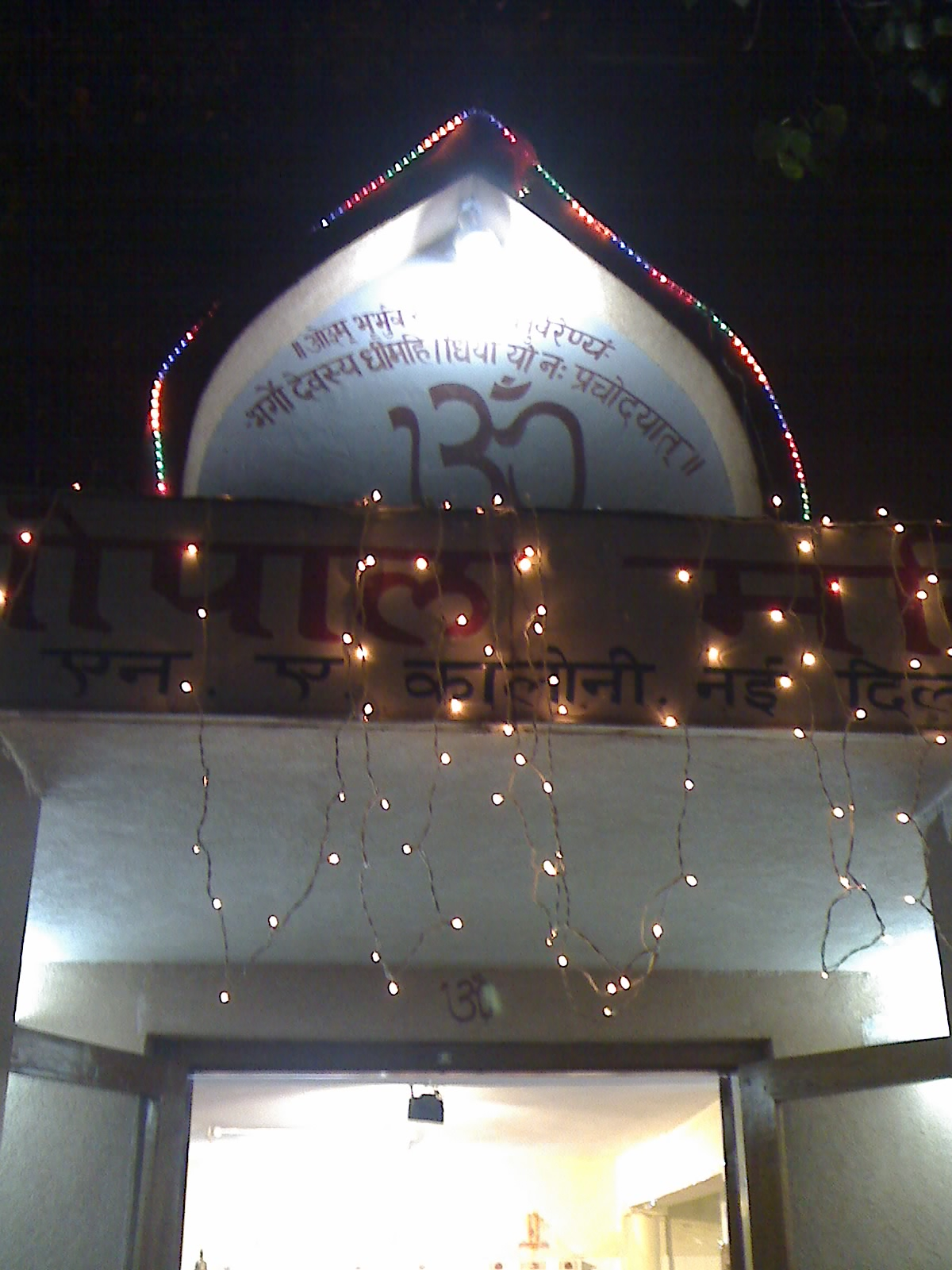

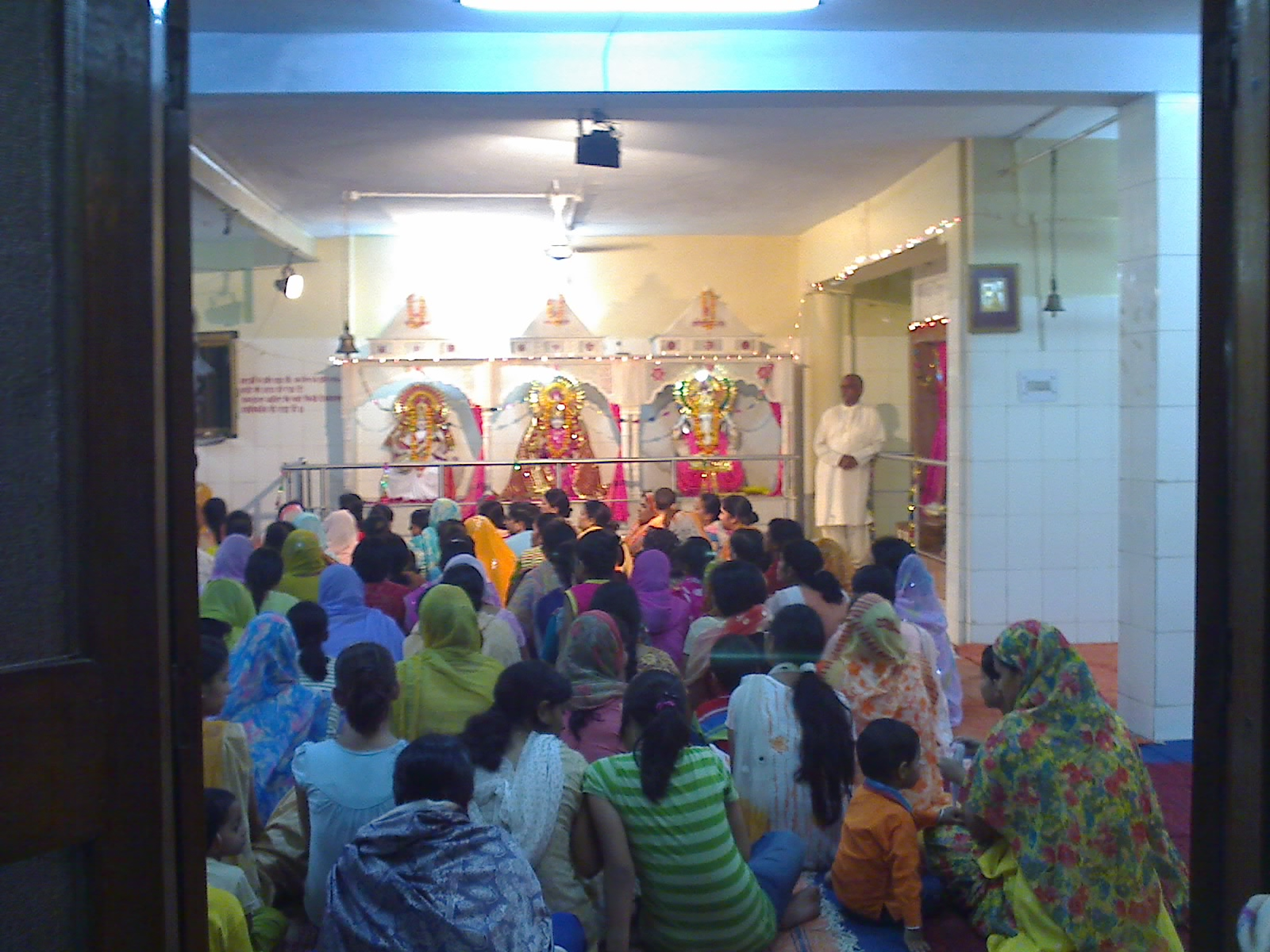
