= Shivpura railway station =

Railway station in Madhya Pradesh

Shivpura

General information
- Location: Maksi, Madhya Pradesh; India
- Coordinates: 23.2558°N 76.0072°E
- Elevation: 498 metres (1,634 ft)
- System: Passenger train station
- Owner: Indian Railways
- Line: Ujjain-Bhopal section
- Platforms: 2
- Tracks: 4
- Connections: Auto stand

Construction
- Structure type: Standard (on-ground station)
- Parking: No
- Cycle facilities: No

Other information
- Status: Active
- Station code: SVT
- Zone(s): Western Railway zone
- Division(s): Ratlam

History
- Rebuilt: 2016; 10 years ago

Services
Preceding station	Indian Railways	Following station
Tajpur towards ?	Western Railway zone Ujjain-Bhopal section	Tarana Road towards ?
Location

Shivpura railway station is a small railway station in the Western Railways in Ujjain district, Madhya Pradesh. Its code is SVT.

== Location ==
It serves Shivpura village. But the day time trains are less in number. There are many hotels and restaurants close to the railway station.
