= RNJ =

RNJ may refer to:

- RNJ, the IATA code for Yoron Airport, Japan
- RNJ, the Indian Railways station code for Runija railway station, Madhya Pradesh, India
