= Lekoda railway station =

Railway station in Madhya Pradesh

Lekoda

General information
- Location: Ujjain, Madhya Pradesh; India
- Coordinates: 23.0757°N 75.6982°E
- Elevation: 513 metres (1,683 ft)
- System: Indian Railways station
- Owner: Indian Railways
- Lines: Akola-Ratlam line (material modification)
- Platforms: 2
- Tracks: 4 (Construction – gauge conversion – MG/NG to single diesel BG)
- Connections: Auto stand

Construction
- Structure type: Standard (on-ground station)
- Parking: No
- Cycle facilities: No

Other information
- Status: Operational
- Station code: LOD
- Zone(s): Western Railways
- Division(s): Ratlam

History
- Rebuilt: 2016

Services
Preceding station	Indian Railways	Following station
Fatehabad Chandrawatiganj Junction towards ?	Western Railway zone Fatehabad Chandrawatiganj-Ujjain section	Chintaman Ganesh towards ?
Location
- Interactive map

Lekoda railway station is a small railway station in Ujjain district, Madhya Pradesh. Its code is LOD. It serves Lekoda village. The station consists of two platforms, neither of which is well sheltered. It lacks many facilities including water and sanitation.
