= Malanpur railway station =

Railway station in Malanpur, India

General information
- Location: Malanpur, Madhya Pradesh; India
- Coordinates: 26.3920°N 78.2607°E
- Elevation: 167 metres (548 ft)
- System: Indian Railways station
- Owner: Indian Railways
- Platforms: 2
- Tracks: 4
- Connections: Auto stand

Construction
- Structure type: Standard (on-ground station)
- Parking: No
- Cycle facilities: No

Other information
- Status: Operational
- Station code: MLAR
- Zone(s): North Central Railway
- Division(s): Jhansi
Location

Malanpu railway station is a small railway station in Bhind district, Madhya Pradesh. Its code is MLAR. It serves Industrial Area of Malanpur. The station consists of two platforms. The platforms are not well sheltered. It lacks many facilities including water and sanitation.

== Major trains ==
- Indore–Bhind Express
- Ratlam–Bhind Express
- Jhansi–Gwalior–Etawah Link Express
- Etawah Kota Express
- Etawah Gwalior Passenger
