= Malanpur =

- Town
- Location in Madhya Pradesh, India Malanpur (India)
- Coordinates: 26.37°N 78.29°E
- Country: India
- State: Madhya Pradesh
- District: Bhind

Population (2001)
  - Total: 5,296

Languages
  - Official: Hindi
- Time zone: UTC+5:30 (IST)
- PIN: 477335
- Vehicle registration: MP 30
- Website: mpcci.in/gwalior-industries.php

Malanpur is an Industrial Area in Bhind District of Madhya Pradesh, being managed by the Madhya Pradesh Industrial Infrastructure Development Corporation (Formerly known as AKVN Gwalior).

== Geography ==
Malanpur is located 10 km outside Gwalior. Malanpur is an industrial town spread over 625 hectares in northern Madhya Pradesh state located in north-central India near to another similar unit of 833 hectares at Ghirongi.

== Demographics ==
As per Census of India 2011, Malanpur city has population of 7,492 of which 4,077 are males and 3,415 are females. The population of children between age 0-6 is 1,206 which is 14.38% of total population.

== Industries ==
Malanpur Industrial Growth Center is being promoted and managed by AKVN Gwalior. The industrial area has attracted many manufacturing units, including some of India's most reputed corporates. Some of the companies which have their production facilities in Malanpur are: White Rhino Brewing Company and C.T. Cotton Yarn Ltd as well as Mondelez International, Jamna Auto and Godrej Soaps

== Connectivity ==
Malanpur is well connected by roads as it is Located on NH 92 connecting Gwalior with Bhind. The nearest railway station at Malanpur, & nearest major railway station is Gwalior. 600 km from Indore
