= White Rhino (brewery) =

Craft brewery in Malanpur, India

- Location: Malanpur, India
- Opened: 2016
- Key people: Ishaan Puri (founder); James Grastang (head brewer)
- Website: whiterhinobrewing.in

Active beers
| Name | Type |
| India Pale Ale (IPA) | India pale ale |
| Lager | Lager |
| Wit | Belgian Witbier |

White Rhino is an Indian brewery located in Malanpur, on the outskirts of Gwalior, India. It is the first craft beer to be brewed and bottled in India. Ishaan Puri is the founder of White Rhino Brewing Co.

== History ==
White Rhino Brewing Co. was founded by Ishaan Puri in 2016 in Malanpur, near a tributary of the Chambal River, which supplies the brewery with brew-quality water. The brewery began with two beers, a Lager and a Belgian Style Wit.

In 2018, White Rhino partnered with a West Yorkshire-based British beer distribution firm, James Clay, to export its lager and India pale ale to the United Kingdom.

== See also ==
- Beer and breweries by region
