= Anas railway station =

Railway station in Dahod district of Gujarat State of India

Anas railway station

General information
- Location: Anas, Gujarat; India
- Coordinates: 22°51′55″N 74°25′17″E
- Elevation: 289 m (948 ft)
- System: Indian Railway Station
- Owner: Indian Railways
- Operator: Western Railway
- Line: New Delhi–Mumbai main line
- Platforms: 3
- Tracks: 3

Construction
- Structure type: Standard (On Ground)
- Parking: Yes

Other information
- Status: Functioning
- Station code: ANAS
- Zone(s): Western Railway
- Division(s): Ratlam
Location
- Location within India Location within Gujarat

Anas railway station is a railway station in Dahod district of Gujarat State of India. It is under Ratlam railway division of Western Railway Zone of Indian Railways. It is located on New Delhi–Mumbai main line of the Indian Railways. Passenger, MEMU and Express trains halt here.

== Major trains ==
The following trains halt at Anas railway station in both direction:

- 19019/20 Bandra Terminus - Dehradun Express
