= Naikheri railway station =

Railway station in Madhya Pradesh

Naikheri

General information
- Location: Naikheri, Ujjain, Madhya Pradesh; India
- Coordinates: 23.2009°N 75.6823°E
- Elevation: 504 metres (1,654 ft)
- System: Express train and Passenger train station
- Owner: Indian Railways
- Operator: Western Railway zone
- Platforms: 2
- Tracks: 4 (Double Electrified BG)
- Connections: Auto stand

Construction
- Structure type: Standard (on-ground station)
- Parking: No
- Cycle facilities: No

Other information
- Status: Functioning
- Station code: NKI
- Zone(s): Western Railway zone
- Division(s): Ratlam
Location

Naikheri railway station is a small railway station in Ujjain district, Madhya Pradesh. Its code is NKI. It serves Naikheri village.

== Infrastructure ==
The station consists of two platforms.

== See also ==
- Ujjain Junction railway station
