= Donta railway station =

Railway station in Madhya Pradesh, India

Donta

General information
- Location: Derawan, Donta, Shajapur district, Madhya Pradesh; India
- Coordinates: 23°13′49″N 76°06′16″E
- System: Passenger train station
- Owner: Indian Railways
- Operator: Western Railway
- Line: Indore–Gwalior line
- Platforms: 1
- Tracks: 1

Construction
- Structure type: Standard (on ground station)

Other information
- Status: Active
- Station code: DON
- Zone(s): Western Railway zone
- Division(s): Ratlam

History
- Opened: 1899
- Former names: Gwalior Light Railway

Services
Preceding station	Indian Railways	Following station
Maksi Junction towards ?	Western Railway zone Indore–Gwalior line	Ranyal Jasmiya towards ?
Location

Donta railway station is a railway station on Indore–Gwalior line under the Ratlam railway division of Western Railway zone. This is situated at Derawan, Donta in Shajapur district of the Indian state of Madhya Pradesh.
