= Akodia railway station =

Railway station in Madhya Pradesh

Akodia

General information
- Location: Akodia, Shajapur district, Madhya Pradesh; India
- Coordinates: 23°22′43″N 76°35′57″E
- Elevation: 461 metres (1,512 ft)
- System: Indian Railways station
- Owner: Indian Railways
- Operator: Western Railway
- Line: Ujjain–Bhopal section
- Platforms: 2
- Tracks: 2

Construction
- Structure type: Standard (on ground)
- Parking: Yes

Other information
- Status: Functioning
- Station code: AKD
- Zone(s): Western Railway
- Division(s): Ratlam
Location
- Location within India Location within Madhya Pradesh

Akodia railway station is a railway station in Shajapur district of Madhya Pradesh. Its code is AKD. It serves Akodia town. The station consists of two platforms. It lacks many facilities including water and sanitation. Passenger, Express and Superfast trains halt here.
