= Piplod railway station =

Railway station in Gujarat, India

Piplod railway station

General information
- Location: Piplod, Dahod district India
- Coordinates: 22°49′05″N 73°54′26″E
- Elevation: 209 m (686 ft)
- System: Indian Railway Station
- Owner: Indian Railways
- Operator: Western Railway
- Line: New Delhi–Mumbai main line
- Platforms: 3
- Tracks: 3

Construction
- Structure type: Standard (On Ground)
- Parking: Yes

Other information
- Status: Functioning
- Station code: PPD
- Zone(s): Western Railway
- Division(s): Ratlam
Location
- Location within India Location within Gujarat

Piplod railway station is a railway station in Dahod district of Gujarat State of India. It is under Ratlam railway division of Western Railway Zone of Indian Railways. It is located on New Delhi–Mumbai main line of the Indian Railways. Passenger, MEMU and Express trains halt here.

== Trains ==
Following trains halt at Piplod railway station in both directions:

- 19019/20 Bandra Terminus - Dehradun Express
- 12929/30 Valsad - Dahod Intercity Superfast Express
- 19023/24 Mumbai Central - Firozpur Janata Express
