= Shambhupura railway station =

Railway station in Rajasthan, India

Shambhupura

General information
- Location: Shambhupura, Chittaurgarh district, Rajasthan; India
- Coordinates: 24.770595°N 74.641816°E
- Elevation: 423 metres (1,388 ft)
- System: Indian Railways station
- Owner: Indian Railways
- Operator: Western Railway
- Lines: Ajmer–Ratlam section Chittaurgarh–Udaipur section Kota–Chittaurgarh line
- Platforms: 3
- Tracks: 5

Construction
- Structure type: Standard (on ground station)
- Parking: Yes

Other information
- Status: Functioning
- Station code: SMP
- Zone(s): Western Railway
- Division(s): Ratlam
Location
- Location within India Location within Rajasthan

Shambhupura railway station is a railway station in Chittaurgarh district, Rajasthan. Its code is SMP. The station consists of a single platform. Passenger, Express trains halt here.
