= Ranyal Jasmiya railway station =

Railway station in Madhya Pradesh, India

Ranyal Jasmiya

General information
- Location: Ranayalgadri, Tonk Khurd, Dewas district, Madhya Pradesh; India
- Coordinates: 23°09′43″N 76°04′21″E
- Elevation: 516 m (1,693 ft)
- System: Passenger train station
- Owner: Indian Railways
- Operator: Western Railway
- Line: Indore–Gwalior line
- Platforms: 1
- Tracks: 1

Construction
- Structure type: Standard (on ground station)

Other information
- Status: Active
- Station code: RCJ
- Zone(s): Western Railway zone
- Division(s): Ratlam

History
- Opened: 1899
- Former names: Gwalior Light Railway

Services
Preceding station	Indian Railways	Following station
Donta towards ?	Western Railway zone Indore–Gwalior line	Silakheri towards ?
Location

Ranyal Jasmiya railway station is a railway station on Indore–Gwalior line under the Ratlam railway division of Western Railway zone. This is situated at Ranayalgadri, Tonk Khurd in Dewas district of the Indian state of Madhya Pradesh.
