= Barnagar railway station =

Railway station in Madhya Pradesh

Barnagar
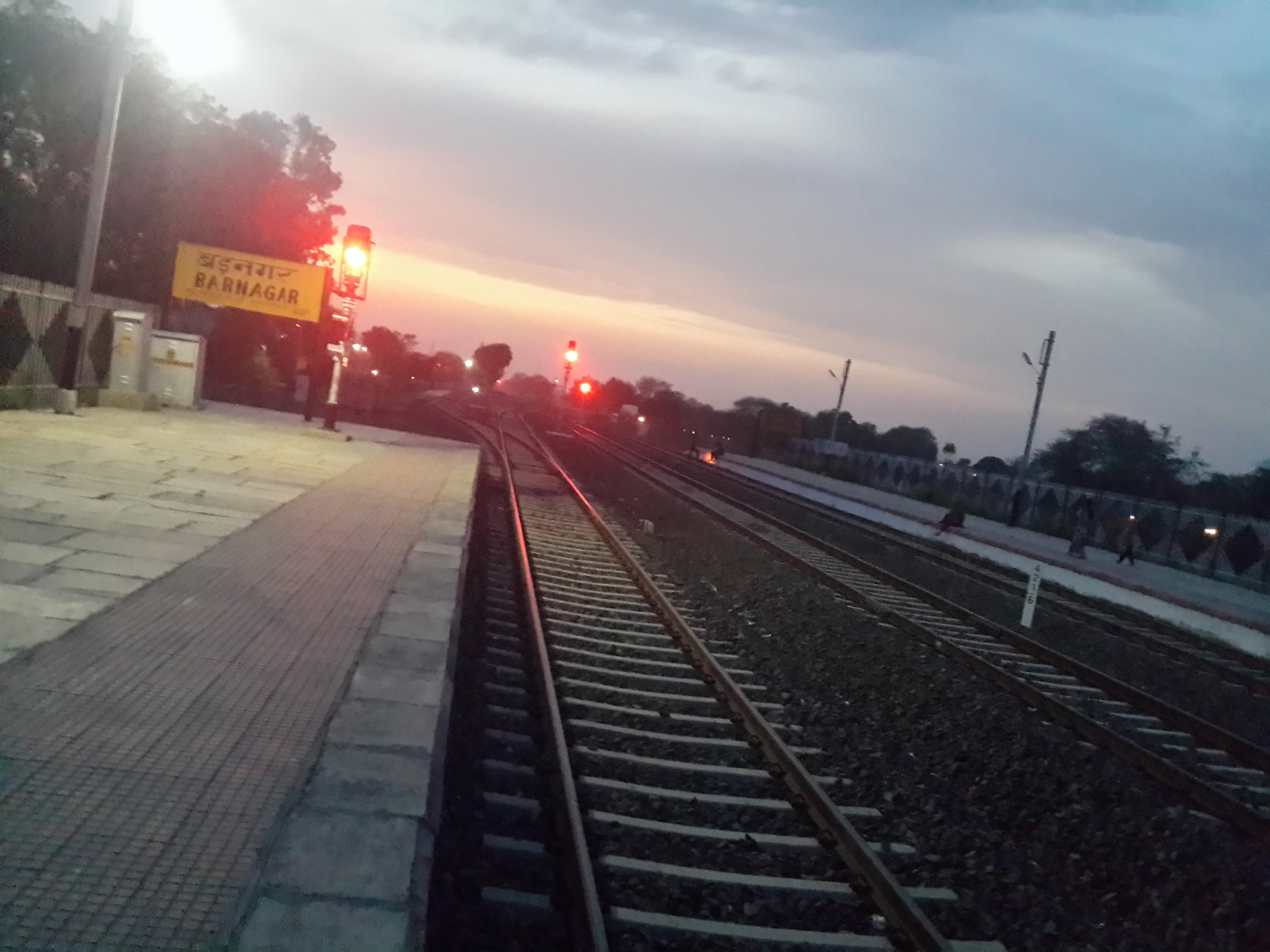
- Barnagar station

General information
- Location: Badnagar, Madhya Pradesh; India
- Coordinates: 23°03′37″N 75°22′37″E
- Elevation: 497 m (1,631 ft)
- System: Indian Railways station
- Owner: Indian Railways
- Operator: Western Railway
- Line: Akola–Ratlam line
- Platforms: 2
- Tracks: 4
- Connections: Taxi stand, Auto stand

Construction
- Structure type: Standard (on-ground station)
- Parking: Available
- Cycle facilities: Available

Other information
- Status: Functioning
- Station code: BNG
- Zone(s): Western Railway
- Division(s): Ratlam

History
- Rebuilt: 2014

Services
Preceding station	Indian Railways	Following station
Pirjhalar towards ?	Western Railway zone Akola–Ratlam line	Sunderabad towards ?
Location
- Interactive map

Barnagar railway station is a railway station in Ujjain district of Madhya Pradesh. Its code is BNG. It serves Badnagar city. The station consists of two platforms. It lacks many facilities including water and sanitation. Passenger, Express and Superfast trains halt here.

In 2015, Ratlam–Indore metre-gauge line was converted into broad-gauge line, hence connecting Indore and Ratlam directly.

== Major trains ==
The following trains halt at Badnagar in both directions:

- 14801/14802 Jodhpur–Indore Express (via Chittaurgarh)
- 11125/11126 Ratlam–Gwalior Intercity Express
- 21125/21126 Ratlam–Bhind Express
- 19337/19338 Indore–Delhi Sarai Rohilla Weekly Express
- 19333/19334 Indore–Bikaner Mahamana Express

== See also ==
- Indore Junction
- Ujjain Junction
