= Safdarjung Terminal =

Safdarjung Terminal, New Delhi is a Delhi Transport Corporation's (DTC's) commencing, terminating, and en route terminal. Due to its proximity to Safdarjung's Tomb it is most commonly called the Safdarjung Terminal.

== Buses commencing & Terminating ==
- 506 Jeer Khure Mandir
- 509 Maidan Garhi
- 516 Dera Gaon
- 517 Aaya Nagar
- 519 Maandi Gaon
- 568 Mangolpuri S- Block
- 569 Sultanpuri - Y Block
- 578 Najafgarh
- 628 Uttamnagar Terminal

== En route buses ==
- 56 New Delhi Rly Station to Vasant Vihar Terminal
- 66 J.L.Nehru Stadium to Vasant Kunj
- 89 Tri Nagar Jai Mata Mkt to Sarojini Nagar Depot
- 512 Ambedkar Nagar Terminal to Sarojini Nagar Depot
