= Nauganwan railway station =

Railway station in Madhya Pradesh

General information
- Location: Madhya Pradesh; India
- Coordinates: 23.2497°N 75.1550°E
- Elevation: 518 metres (1,699 ft)
- System: Indian Railways station
- Owner: Indian Railways
- Platforms: 1
- Tracks: 1
- Connections: Auto stand

Construction
- Structure type: Standard (on-ground station)
- Parking: No
- Cycle facilities: No

Other information
- Status: BG
- Station code: NGW
- Zone(s): WR
- Division(s): Ratlam

History
- Rebuilt: 2016

Services
Preceding station	Indian Railways	Following station
Pritam Nagar towards ?	Western Railway zone Akola–Ratlam line	Ratlam Junction towards ?
Location

Nauganwan railway station is a small railway station in Ratlam district, Madhya Pradesh. Its code is NGW. It serves Nauganwan area. The station consists of single platform, which is not well sheltered. It lacks many facilities including water and sanitation.
