= Gautampura Road railway station =

Railway station in Madhya Pradesh

General information
- Location: Gautampura, Madhya Pradesh; India
- Coordinates: 23.0268°N 75.5286°E
- Elevation: 493 metres (1,617 ft)
- System: Indian Railways station
- Owner: Indian Railways
- Operator: Western Railway
- Line: Jaipur–Ajmer–Ratlam–Indore
- Platforms: 1
- Tracks: 2
- Connections: Taxi stand, auto stand

Construction
- Parking: Yes
- Cycle facilities: Yes

Other information
- Status: Functioning
- Station code: GPX
- Zone(s): Western Railway
- Division(s): Ratlam

History
- Rebuilt: 2015

Services
Preceding station	Indian Railways	Following station
Osra towards ?	Western Railway zone Akola–Ratlam line	Pirjhalar towards ?
Location
- Interactive map

Gautampura Road railway station (station code: GPX) is one of the local railway stations in Ujjain. The station used to be a metre-gauge station on Ratlam–Indore metre-gauge line.

In 2015, Ratlam–Indore metre-gauge line was converted into a broad-gauge line, hence connecting Indore and Ratlam directly.

== Major trains ==
The following trains stop at Gautampura Road Junction:

- 79312/79311 Laxmibai Nagar–Ratlam DEMU
- 79305/79306 Ratlam–Indore DMU

== See also ==
- Indore Junction
- Ujjain Junction
- Fatehabad Chandrawatiganj Junction
