= Ratlam–Bhind Express =

Ratlam - Bhind Express
Overview
- Service type: Express
- Locale: Madhya Pradesh
- Current operator: North Central Railway zone

Route
- Termini: Ratlam Junction; Bhind
- Distance travelled: 762 km (473 mi)
- Average journey time: 16h 40m
- Service frequency: 3 Days
- Train number: 21125DN / 21126UP

On-board services
- Classes: AC 2 Tier, AC 3 Tier, Sleeper 3 Tier, Unreserved
- Seating arrangements: No
- Sleeping arrangements: Yes
- Catering facilities: E-Catering
- Entertainment facilities: No
- Baggage facilities: No

Technical
- Rolling stock: 2
- Track gauge: 1,676 mm (5 ft 6 in)
- Operating speed: 47 km/h (29 mph) average with halts

The Ratlam - Bhind Express is an express train service which runs between Ratlam Junction railway station of Ratlam of Central India state of Madhya Pradesh and Bhind railway station near Gwalior, the other important city of the same state.

== Number and nomenclature ==
The number provided for the service is

- 21126 – From Bhind to Ratlam
- 21125 – From Ratlam to Bhind

== Coach composite ==
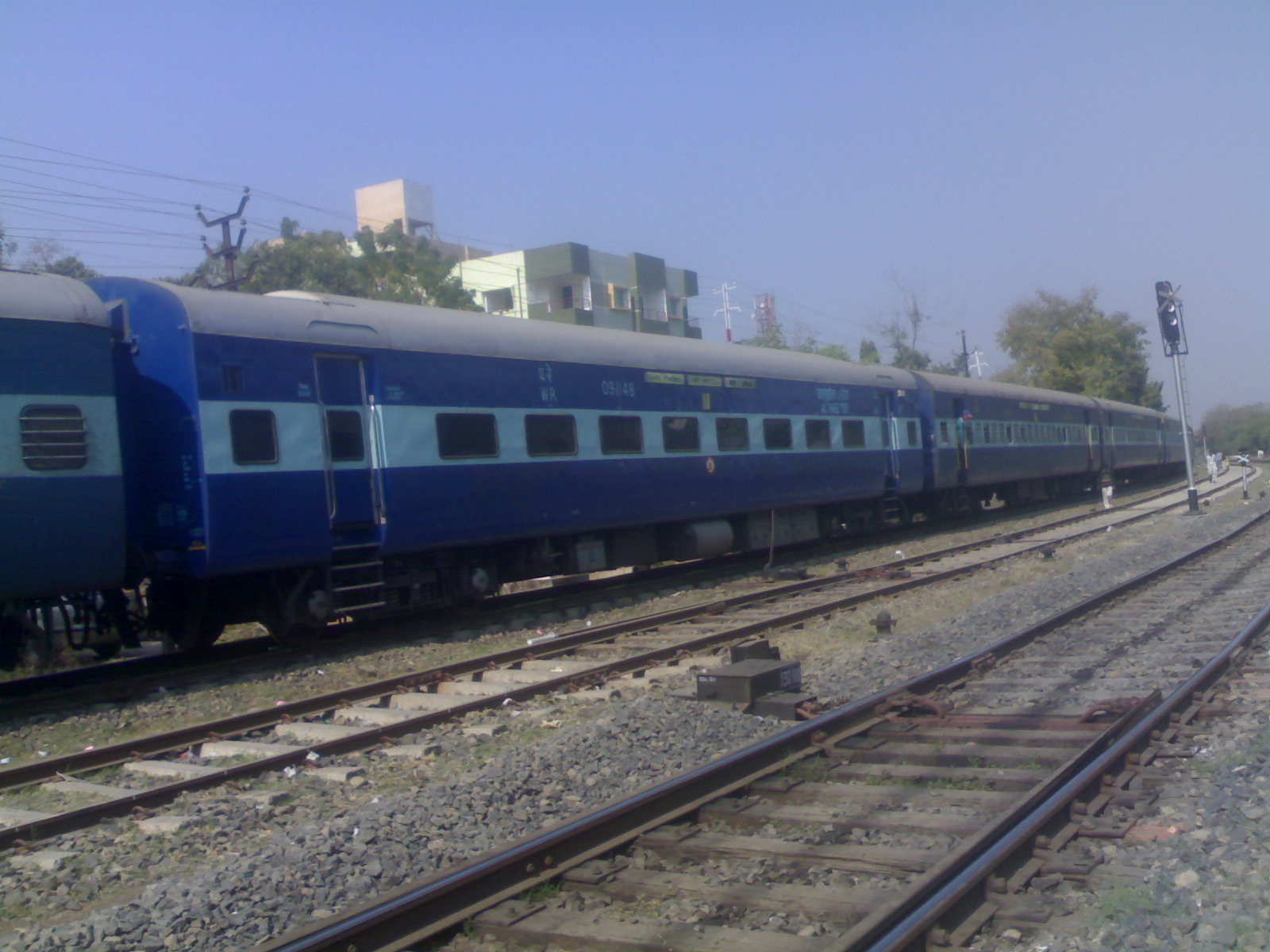
An AC Coach of Indore – Bhind Express train

The train generally consist of 17 Coaches as follows :

- 1 AC 2 Tier
- 2 AC 3 Tier
- 8 Sleeper Coach
- 4 Second Class Coaches
- 2 Luggage cum Parcel

== Route and halts ==
The train goes via Barnagar, Indore, Dewas, Ujjain, Maksi, Biaora, Guna, Shivpuri Gwalior Malanpur and Bhind

== See also ==
- Bhopal–Gwalior Intercity Express
- Indore–Amritsar Express
- Indore–Bhopal Intercity Express
