= Osra railway station =

Railway station in Madhya Pradesh

General information
- Location: Madhya Pradesh; India
- Coordinates: 23.0757°N 75.6982°E
- Elevation: 513 metres (1,683 ft)
- System: Indian Railways station
- Owner: Indian Railways
- Platforms: 2
- Tracks: 2
- Connections: Auto stand

Construction
- Structure type: Standard (on-ground station)
- Parking: No
- Cycle facilities: No

Other information
- Status: BG
- Station code: OSRA
- Zone(s): WR
- Division(s): Ratlam

History
- Rebuilt: 2016

Services
Preceding station	Indian Railways	Following station
Fatehabad Chandrawatiganj Junction towards ?	Western Railway zone Akola–Ratlam line	Gautampura Road towards ?
Location

Osra railway station is a small railway station in Ujjain district, Madhya Pradesh. Its code is OSRA. It serves Osra village. The station consists of two platforms, neither of which is well sheltered. It lacks many facilities including water and sanitation.
