= Laxmibai Nagar railway station =

Railway station in Madhya Pradesh

Laxmibai Nagar Junction
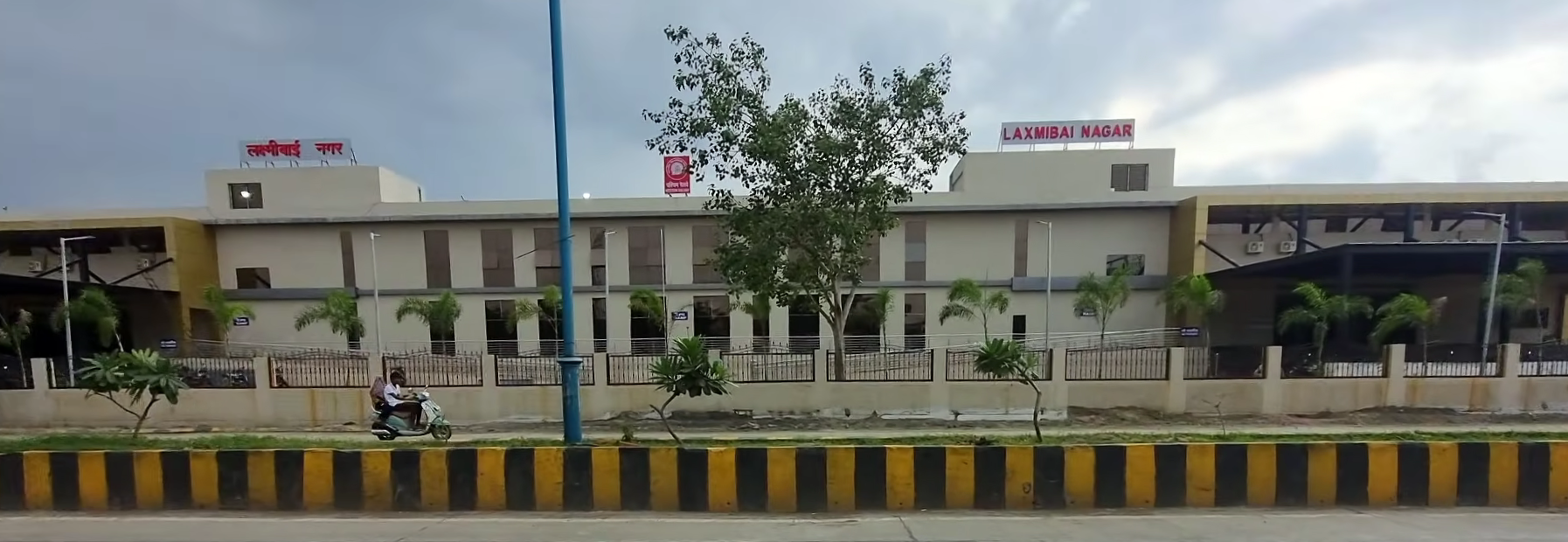
- Laxmibai Nagar Station Platform 2

General information
- Location: Bhagirathpura, Indore, Madhya Pradesh; India
- Coordinates: 22.745°N 75.856°E
- Elevation: 542.31 metres (1,779.2 ft)
- System: Express, Suburban train and Passenger train station
- Owner: Indian Railways
- Lines: Akola–Ratlam line Indore-Dewas-Ujjain section
- Platforms: 5
- Tracks: 11
- Connections: Taxi stand, auto stand

Construction
- Parking: Yes
- Cycle facilities: Yes
- Accessible: Disabled access

Other information
- Status: Active
- Station code: LMNR
- Fare zone: Western Railway zone

History
- Electrified: 2011

Services
| Preceding station | Indian Railways | Following station |
|---|---|---|
| Indore Junction towards ? | Western Railway zone | Manglia Gaon towards ? |
| Indore Junction towards ? | Western Railway zone Akola–Ratlam line | Palia towards ? |
Location
- Interactive map

The Laxmibai Nagar (station code: LMNR) is the second railway stations of Indore.

The railway station of Laxmibai Nagar is located on broad-gauge line. Its route is connected with Ujjain Junction to the north west, Dewas Junction to the north, and Indore Junction to the south. It is connected to Bhopal, Ujjain, Gwalior, Jaipur, Jabalpur, Katni, Khandwa, Ratlam and Bina within the state and almost every other state of India. The Indore Rail Yard is also located Laxmibai Nagar.

== Development ==
From February 2023, the station is being re-developed as a secondary station to decrease the growing load on Indore Junction. Along with increasing the elevation of current platforms, two new platforms and a station building is in progress at various stages. All these efforts are being made towards making it a major station.

== Major trains ==
The trains having stoppage at the station are listed as follows:

| Number | Name | Type |
|---|---|---|
| 20973/20974 | Firozpur–Rameswaram Humsafar Express | Humsafar |
| 18233/18234 | Narmada Express | Express |
| 14801/14802 | Jodhpur-Indore Express | Express |
| 09351/09352; 09353/09354 | Indore–Ujjain Passenger | Local |
| 09347/09348; 09389/09390; 09535/09536; 09547/09548 | Indore–Ratlam DEMU | Local |
| 09587/09588 | Indore–Nagda Passenger | Local |
| 14309/14310 | Ujjaini Express | Express |

== See also ==
- Indore Junction
- Ujjain Junction
- Bhopal Junction
- Dewas Junction
- Fatehabad Chandrawatiganj Junction
