= Tarana Road railway station =

Railway station in Madhya Pradesh

Tarana Road

General information
- Location: Tarana, Ujjain district, Madhya Pradesh; India
- Coordinates: 23.2642°N 76.0665°E
- Elevation: 500 metres (1,600 ft)
- System: Indian Railways station
- Owner: Indian Railways
- Operator: Western Railway
- Platforms: 2
- Tracks: 4 (Double Electrified BG)
- Connections: Auto stand

Construction
- Structure type: Standard (on-ground station)
- Parking: No
- Cycle facilities: No

Other information
- Status: Functioning
- Station code: TAN
- Zone(s): Western Railway
- Division(s): Ratlam
Location

Tarana Road railway station is a small railway station in Ujjain district, Madhya Pradesh. Its code is TAN. It serves Tarana town. The station consists of two platforms, neither well sheltered. It lacks many facilities including water and sanitation. This station is electrified in 1992 and Ratlam–Ujjain-Bhopal passenger was first electric train on this track.

== Major trains ==
- Indore–Bhopal Express
- Bina–Ratlam via Nagda Passenger (unreserved)
- Dahod–Bhopal Intercity Express
- Somnath–Jabalpur Express (via Itarsi)
- Nagda–Bina Passenger (unreserved)
- Narmada Express
- Darbhanga–Ahmedabad Sabarmati Express
- Varanasi–Ahmedabad Sabarmati Express
- Ujjain–Bhopal Passenger
