= Pirjhalar railway station =

Railway station in Madhya Pradesh

General information
- Location: Madhya Pradesh; India
- Coordinates: 23.0437°N 75.4739°E
- Elevation: 503 metres (1,650 ft)
- System: Indian Railways station
- Owner: Indian Railways
- Platforms: 2
- Tracks: 2
- Connections: Auto stand

Construction
- Structure type: Standard (on-ground station)
- Parking: No
- Cycle facilities: No

Other information
- Status: BG
- Station code: PJH
- Zone(s): WR
- Division(s): Ratlam

History
- Rebuilt: 2016

Services
Preceding station	Indian Railways	Following station
Gautampura Road towards ?	Western Railway zone Akola–Ratlam line	Barnagar towards ?
Location
- Interactive map

Pirjhalar railway station is a small railway station in Ujjain district, Madhya Pradesh. Its code is PJH. It serves Pir Jhalar village. The station consists of two platforms, neither of which is well sheltered. It lacks many facilities including water and sanitation.
