= Badnagar =

- Tehsil
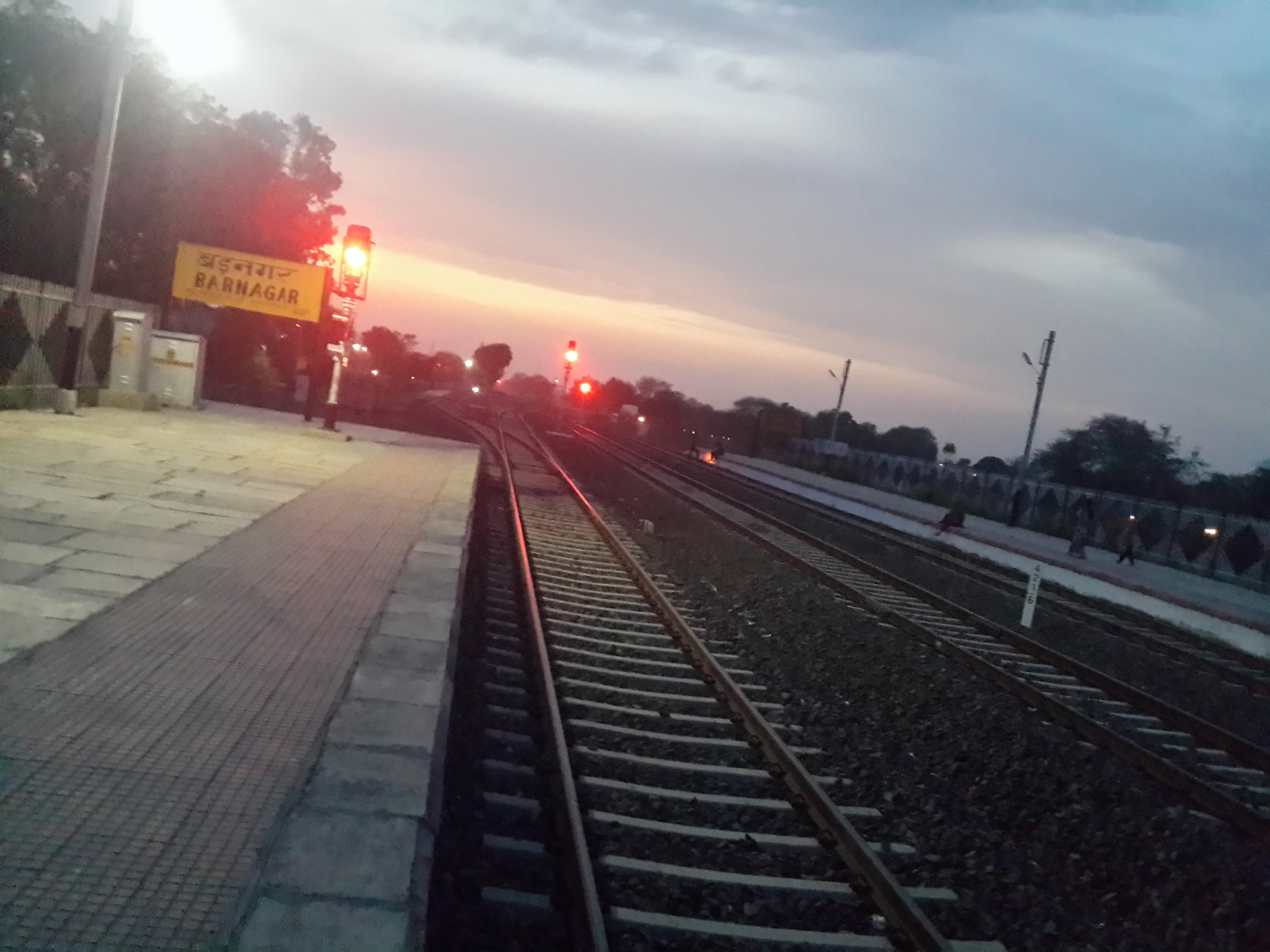

- Location in Madhya Pradesh, India
- Coordinates: 23°3′7″N 75°22′40″E
- Country: India
- State: Madhya Pradesh
- Region: Malwa
- District: Ujjain

Government
  - Type: Democratic
  - Body: Badnagar Municipality
  - M.L.A.: Jitendra Ji Pandya (BJP)
  - M.P.: Anil Firojiya (BJP)
  - Municipal Chairman: Abhay Tongya (BJP)

Area
  - Tehsil: 6.74 km^{2} (2.60 sq mi)
- Elevation: 497 m (1,631 ft)

Population (2011)
  - Tehsil: 269,573
  - Urban: 40,088
  - Urban density: 5,938/km^{2} (15,380/sq mi)
  - Rural: 229,485

Languages
  - Official: Hindi,
  - Other: Malvi
- Time zone: UTC+5:30 (IST)
- Postal code: 456771
- Telephone code: 07367
- Vehicle registration: MP-13

Badnagar is a town, and a municipality in Ujjain district in the state of Madhya Pradesh, India. Badnagar Tehsil Headquarters is Badnagar town and it belongs to Ujjain Division. It is located 45 km towards west from District headquarters Ujjain. 244 km from the state capital, Bhopal, towards the east and 72 km from Indore.

Badnagar is also famous for its fort, Amla Fort.

== Geography ==
Badnagar is situated on the bank of river Chamla. Badnagar Tehsil is bounded by Badnawar Tehsil towards west, Depalpur Tehsil towards the south, Khachrod Tehsil towards north, Ujjain district towards the east. Indore City, Ujjain City, Ratlam City, Dhar City nearby cities to Badnagar. Badnagar consists of 196 villages and 108 Panchayats. This place is on the border of Ujjain and Dhar Districts. Dhar District, Badnawar, is west of this place. Sundrabad is located 13 km away from Badnagar. Bhat Pachlana is other major town in this Tehsil.

== Demographics ==
As of the 2011 Census of India, Badnagar had a population of 2,69,573. Among all population no. of males are 1,37,685 and no. of females are 1,31,888. Number of literates in Badnagar are 1,69,935. Among all literates, the number of males is 1,00,562 and the number of females is 69,373 and the total number of illiterates here is 99,638. 38,158 people of the population is under 6 years of age.

POPULATION	PERSONS	MALE	FEMALE
Total	269,573	137,685	131,888
In the age group 0–6 years	38,158	19,804	18,354
Scheduled Castes (SC)	59,160	30,148	29,012
Scheduled Tribes (ST)	16,823	8,565	8,258
Literates	169,935	100,562	69,373
Illiterate	99,638	37,123	62,515
Total Worker	138,314	79,567	58,747
Main Worker	112,444	71,837	40,607
Main Worker – Cultivator	54,894	35,530	19,364
Main Worker – Agricultural Labourers	38,769	20,732	18,037
Main Worker – Household Industries	1,579	1,061	518
Main Worker – Other	17,202	14,514	2,688
Marginal Worker	25,870	7,730	18,140
Marginal Worker – Cultivator	9,194	1,829	7,365
Marginal Worker – Agriculture Labourers	15,071	5,000	10,071
Marginal Worker – Household Industries	325	142	183
Marginal Workers – Other	1,280	759	521
Marginal Worker (3–6 Months)	21,344	6,148	15,196
Marginal Worker – Cultivator (3–6 Months)	7,129	1,196	5,933
Marginal Worker – Agriculture Labourers (3–6 Months)	12,921	4,218	8,703
Marginal Worker – Household Industries (3–6 Months)	215	94	121
Marginal Worker – Other (3–6 Months)	1,079	640	439
Marginal Worker (0–3 Months)	4,526	1,582	2,944
Marginal Worker – Cultivator (0–3 Months)	2,065	633	1,432
Marginal Worker – Agriculture Labourers (0–3 Months)	2,150	782	1,368
Marginal Worker – Household Industries (0–3 Months)	110	48	62
Marginal Worker – Other Workers (0–3 Months)	201	119	82
Non Worker	131,259	58,118	73,141

== Climate ==
It is hot in summer. Badnagar summer highest day temperature is in between 30 °C to 42 °C .

Average temperatures of January is 19 °C, February is 22 °C, March is 28 °C, April is 32 °C, May is 35 °C

== Transportation ==
Badnagar is well connected by road and rail with cities like Ujjain, Indore and Ratlam. state highway 18 (dewas to badnawar). Passes through Badnagar which connects it with Ujjain, Bhopal, Dewas and Ahmedabad via Dahod. Badnagar railway station is situated on ratlam-Indore section of Indian Railways. Nearest airport is Indore airport.

== Education ==
Educational institutes in Badnagar teach in both English and Hindi. There are two colleges in Badnagar.

Schools

- Shree Digamber Jain sanmati vidhiya mander badnagar
- SHREE SHARDA HR.SEC.SCHOOL (since 1980).
- Saraswati Vidhya Mandir Badnagar
- Unique Public School Badnagar
- St. Thomas Hr. Sec. School (since 1974) Badnagar (the first private school of Badnagar)
- Jain Public School Badnagar
- Vidhyanjali International School
- St. Martin's Hr. Sec. School Badnagar

Colleges

- Govt. College Badnagar

== Health ==
Many people from nearby cities come to Badnagar for cheap medical treatment of kidney stones and other surgeries. Badnagar is well known for its treatment of paralysis. Some hospitals are:

1. Kabra Hospital
2. Geeta Hospital
3. Civil Hospital
4. City Hospital
5. Ashok hospital
6. Gupta hospital
7. Shrivastava Hospital
8. iLife Clincs & Research Pvt Ltd

== Culture ==
Badnagar is also famous for its dishes, most famous among them being Bhutte ke Laddu, Dal Biscuit and for its guavas. Badnagar is the birthplace of national poet Kavi Pradeep. Former Indian Prime Minister Atal Bihari Vajpayee spent some of his childhood time in Badnagar. Another famous poet from Badnagar is Ibrahim Khan Gauri, the lyricist of hit movies of Rakesh Roshan like Kaho Naa... Pyaar Hai and Koi... Mil Gaya.
