= Sunderabad railway station =

Railway station in Madhya Pradesh

General information
- Location: Madhya Pradesh; India
- Coordinates: 23.1252°N 75.3110°E
- Elevation: 505 metres (1,657 ft)
- System: Indian Railways station
- Owner: Indian Railways
- Platforms: 1
- Tracks: 1

Construction
- Structure type: Standard (on-ground station)
- Parking: No
- Cycle facilities: No

Other information
- Status: BG
- Station code: SNBD
- Zone(s): WR
- Division(s): Ratlam

History
- Rebuilt: 2016

Services
Preceding station	Indian Railways	Following station
Barnagar towards ?	Western Railway zone Akola–Ratlam line	Runija towards ?
Location

Sunderabad railway station is a small railway station in Ratlam district, Madhya Pradesh. Its code is SNBD. It serves Sunderabad village. The station consists of two platforms, neither of which is well sheltered. It lacks many facilities including water and sanitation.
