= Ajnod railway station =

Railway station in Madhya Pradesh

General information
- Location: Madhya Pradesh; India
- Coordinates: 22.9315°N 75.7383°E
- Elevation: 513 metres (1,683 ft)
- System: Indian Railways station
- Owner: Indian Railways
- Platforms: 1
- Tracks: 1
- Connections: Auto stand

Construction
- Structure type: Standard (on-ground station)
- Parking: No
- Cycle facilities: No

Other information
- Status: Active
- Station code: AJN
- Zone(s): WR
- Division(s): Ratlam

History
- Rebuilt: 2016

Services
Preceding station	Indian Railways	Following station
Balauda Takun towards ?	Western Railway zone Akola–Ratlam line	Fatehabad Chandrawatiganj Junction towards ?
Location
- Interactive map

Ajnod railway station is a small railway station in Indore, Madhya Pradesh. Its code is AJN. This railway station is built on the Indore–Fatehabad metre-gauge railway line now broad gauge. The station consists of a single platform. The platform is not well sheltered. It lacks many facilities, including water and sanitation.

== Trains ==
The following trains stops at Ajnod :

- 79312/79311 Laxmibai Nagar–Ratlam DEMU
- 79305/79306 Ratlam–Indore DMU

== See also ==
- Indore Junction
- Ujjain Junction
