= Laxmibai Nagar =

Laxmi Bai Nagar
- Neighborhood of Delhi
- Location in Delhi, India
- Coordinates: 28.576834°N 77.205884°E
- Country: India
- State: Delhi
- Metro: New Delhi

Government
  - Body: New Delhi Municipal Council

Languages
  - Official: Hindi
- Time zone: UTC+5:30 (IST)
- PIN: 110023
- Website: ndmc.gov.in

Laxmi Bai Nagar is a VIP residential colony in New Delhi, India. Laxmi Bai, meaning "city of Lakshmibai", is named for the Rani (queen) of the Maratha-ruled Jhansi State in India, which is now a province of modern Uttar Pradesh state. She fought for independence from the British Raj during the Indian Rebellion of 1857 and died in combat.

Laxmi Bai Nagar hosts doctors and staff of Central Government Health Scheme and serves as official residences for many civil servants to the Union Government and other employees of the government.

Laxmi Bai Nagar largely hosts doctors and staff of Central Government Health Scheme having 2000 govt. Flats & 24 Private Flats opposite N P Co. Edu. School.

It has two local markets, one taxi stand, three bus stands, one dispensary, two gyms, two barat ghars, one gurudwara, five temples, five schools & equipped with all civic amentities.

== Attractions ==
- Sanjay Gandhi Lake Park
- Sarojini Nagar Market
- Dilli Haat
- INA Market
- Lodhi Gardens
- Safdarjung's Tomb
- South Extension Market
- Kidwai Nagar West
- Mini Market, adjacent Barat Ghar
- NDMC BARAT GHAR
- Chitra working Girls Hostel
- Grih Kalyan Kendra

== Educational Institutions ==
- D.T.E.A. Senior Secondary School
- Govt. Boys senior secondary schools|Govt. Boys Senior Secondary School
- Govt. Girls senior secondary schools|Govt. Girls Senior Secondary School
- Senior Navyug School
- N P Co-Ed Secondary School

== Local Restaurants ==
- Rang De Basanti Dhaba
- Amar Jyoti
- dharmesh cafe
- Khatta Meetha
- Domino's
- Haldiram's
- McDonald's
