= Balauda Takun railway station =

Railway station in Madhya Pradesh

Balauda Takun

General information
- Location: MP SH 27, Balauda Takun, Madhya Pradesh; India
- Coordinates: 22.8737°N 75.7563°E
- Elevation: 539 metres (1,768 ft)
- System: Indian Railways station
- Owner: Indian Railways
- Line: Akola–Ratlam line
- Platforms: 1
- Tracks: 2
- Connections: Auto stand

Construction
- Structure type: Standard (on-ground station)
- Parking: No
- Cycle facilities: No

Other information
- Station code: BLDK
- Zone(s): Western Railway
- Division(s): Ratlam

Services
Preceding station	Indian Railways	Following station
Palia towards ?	Western Railway zone Akola–Ratlam line	Ajnod towards ?
Location
- Interactive map

Balauda Takun railway station is a small railway station in Indore district, Madhya Pradesh. Its code is BLDK. It serves Balauda Takun village. The station consists of two platforms. The platforms are not well sheltered. It lacks many facilities including water and sanitation.
