= Runija railway station =

Railway station in Madhya Pradesh

General information
- Location: Madhya Pradesh; India
- Coordinates: 22.9134°N 75.2542°E
- Elevation: 527 metres (1,729 ft)
- System: Indian Railways station
- Owner: Indian Railways
- Platforms: 1
- Tracks: 3

Construction
- Structure type: Standard (on-ground station)
- Parking: No
- Cycle facilities: No

Other information
- Status: BG
- Station code: RNJ
- Zone(s): WR
- Division(s): Ratlam

History
- Rebuilt: 2016

Services
Preceding station	Indian Railways	Following station
Sunderabad towards ?	Western Railway zone Akola–Ratlam line	Pritam Nagar towards ?
Location

Sunderabad railway station is a small railway station in Ujjain district, Madhya Pradesh. Its code is RNJ. It serves Runija area. The station consists of a single platform which is well sheltered.
