= Ratlam railway division =

Railway division of India

Ratlam Division

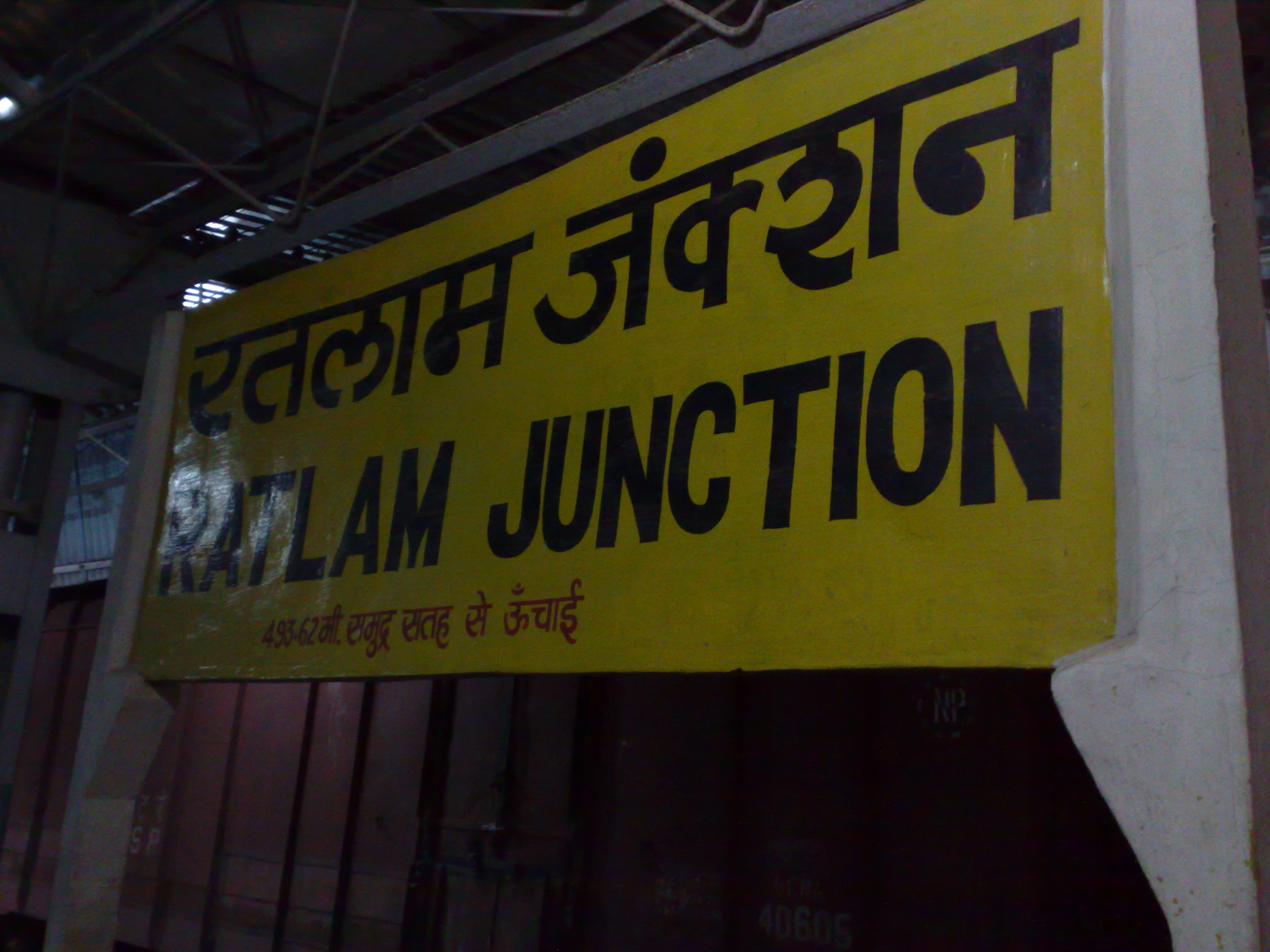
- Ratlam Junction Railway Station

General information
- Location: India
- Coordinates: 23°20′27″N 75°03′04″E
- Elevation: 493 metres (1,617 ft)
- System: Railway Division
- Owner: Indian Railways
- Operator: Western Railways
- Lines: New Delhi–Mumbai main line, Akola–Ratlam line
- Tracks: 9

Construction
- Parking: Yes

Other information
- Status: Functioning
- Fare zone: Western Railway zone

History
- Opened: August 1956, 15; 70 years ago
Location

Ratlam railway division is one of the six railway divisions under the jurisdiction of Western Railway zone of the Indian Railways. This railway division was formed on 1 April 1952 and its headquarter is located at Ratlam in the state of Madhya Pradesh of India.

The Broad gauge portion extends from Godhra to Bhopal, Ujjain to Dr. Ambedkar Nagar and Dr. Ambedkar Nagar–Fatehabad–Ratlam–Chanderia, Maksi Dewas & Khandwa Cabin to Nimarkheri.

The metre-gauge portion of the division extends from Dr. Ambedkar Nagar railway station to Omkareshwar Road railway station.

The division has the longest and steepest gradients of 1:150 on broad gauge between Limkheda and Rentia stations of Ratlam–Godhra section. Metre gauge also has the longest and steepest gradients of 1:40 with reverse curve of 8.80 between Kalakund and Patalpani station of Dr. Ambedkar Nagar–Khandwa section.

The division is not only of geographical importance but also of industrial, social, economic and historical importance. Besides Indore Junction, which is one of the most important commercial cities of Madhya Pradesh on Ratlam division, Dewas and Nagda Junction are the other industrially developed towns on the division while Pithampur near Indore is the newly developed industrial area. The division includes the tribal districts of Jhabua and Dhar, the historical and holy cities of Ujjain and Omkareshwar. Chittaurgarh of the Rajasthan Mewar area is one of the world famed historical cities and an important tourist place.

The division transports 1.44 lakh of passengers per day by running 143 BG Mail/Express train and 38 (34+4) BG/MG passenger train per day. Ratlam division is contributing significantly in the development of social and economical conditions of the area by transporting various commodities like cement, clinker, manganese ore, sodium sulphate, caustic soda, wheat etc. from various loading points.

Mumbai WR railway division, Ahmedabad railway division, Bhavnagar railway division, Rajkot railway division and Vadodara railway division are the other five railway divisions under WR Zone headquartered at Churchgate, Mumbai.

== History ==
Ratlam Division of Western Railway came into existence on 15 August 1956, under Divisionalisation scheme of Indian Railways. The inauguration ceremony was performed by Shri Thakatmal Jain, the then Chief Minister of Madhya Bharat State.

=== Holkar Railway ===
Maharaja Holkar, in 1870, offered a loan of Rs. 100 lakhs for the construction of a rail-line to his capital city of Indore, taking off from the G.I.P. main line. A quick survey was made and Khandwa on the G.I.P. line was chosen as junction point. The alignment was to pass through Sanawad, Kheree Ghat on the Narmada and then by way of the Choral Valley up the slopes of the Vindhyas to Indore. Maharaja Holkar's contribution accelerated the construction of rail-lines in Malwa region. The Holkar Railway required very heavy works due to very steep gradients (up to 1 in 40) on the Vindhya Ghats. It also involved digging of four tunnels aggregating 510 yards in length, deep cuttings and heavy retaining walls. River Narmada was crossed by a brigade of 14 spans, 197 feet each and piers 80 feet above low water level. There are 14 other large bridges with high piers, the highest pier being 152 feet above the bottom of the ravine. The first section Khandwa–Sanawad was opened for traffic on 1.12.1874. The Narmada Bridge was opened for traffic on 5.10.1876 by His Highness the Maharaja of Holkar who named it 'Holkar-Narmada Bridge'.

=== Scindia–Neemuch Railway ===
Surveys between Indore and Neemuch started long back in 1871–72 when the plan and estimates for the whole project was submitted to the Government of India in 1872–73. Maharaja of Scindia agreed to grant a loan of Rs. 75 lakhs at 4 per cent per annum interest for the project and the railway was renamed as 'Scindia-Neemuch Railway'. It also included a branch line to Ujjain from Indore. The Indore – Ujjain branch line was opened in August 1876 and the line was completed in 1879–80.

=== NEEMUCH–NASIRABAD RAILWAY ===
Neemuch–Nasirabad railway construction planning was made for joining Rajputana railway and Nasirabad Scindia railway to Neemuch. Although the survey of Neemuch–Nasirabad railway was carried out in the year 1871–72, the construction was started in the year 1879, and the work completed in March 1881.

=== Rajputana Malwa Railway ===
The following three units: Holkar Railway, Scindia-Neemuch Railway & Neemuch–Nasirabad Railway were amalgamated under a single management in the year 1881-82 and were named as Rajputana Malwa railway.

=== B.B. & C.I. Railway ===
The management of Rajputana Malwa railway was taken over by the B.B.& C.I. Company on 01.01.1885. Till independence of the country, the complete metre-gauge network of Ratlam division was managed by them. The first broad gauge line of the division from Godhra to Limkheda was completed in the year 1893 and Limkheda–Dahod, Ratlam line was completed and opened for traffic in 1894, while the Ratlam–Nagda–Ujjain BG line completed and opened for traffic during the year 1896. The whole management of this line was under them till independence.

== Infrastructure ==
On 5 November 1951, Western Railway with its headquarters at Bombay came into existence after the merging of BB & CI Railway with the other state railways. The doubling of the following sections were completed as per year indicated against them:-

S. No.	Section	Start	End
1	Godhra–Piplod	1958	1959
2	Piplod–Dahod–Ratlam	1959	1960
3	Ratlam–Nagda	1960	1962
4	Ujjain–Maksi	1964	1965
5	Nagda–Ujjain	1979	1981
6	Maksi–Bhopal	1993	2001
7	Kalapipal–Phanda	2003	2008
8	Akodia–Mohammadkheda–Shujalpur	2005	2010
9	Parbati-Baktal	2012	2013
9	Chittaurgarh–Shambhupura	2018	2019

On Dahod-Ratlam section – New tunnel at PCN was built in the year 1988, Mahi River Bridge in 1992 and Anas River Bridge were completed and opened for traffic in 1996.

== List of railway stations and towns ==
The list includes the stations under the Ratlam division and their station category.

Category of station	No. of stations	Names of stations
A-1	2	Indore Junction, Ratlam Junction
A	3	Ujjain Junction, Chittaurgarh Junction, Nagda Junction
B	5	Dahod, Dr. Ambedkar Nagar, Dewas Junction, Mandsaur, Neemuch
C suburban station	0	-
D	17	Akodia, Bairagarh, Bamnia, Badnagar, Berchha, Jaora, Kalapipal, Khachrod, Laxmibai Nagar Junction, Maksi Junction, Meghnagar, Nimbahera, Omkareshwar Road, Rajendra Nagar, Sehore, Shujalpur, Thandla Road
E	73	Ajnod, Ajanti, Amargarh, Anas, Aslaoda, Attar, Bajrangarh, Bakanian Bhaunri, Bangrod, Barwaha, Brayla Chaurasi, Barlai, Berawanya, Bhairongarh, Baktal, Bildi, Bolai, Bordi, Chanchelav, Chanderiya, Choral, Dalauda, Dhodhar, Fatehabad Chandrawatiganj Junction, Gautampura Road, Haranya Kheri, Harkia Khal, Jabri, Jawad Road, Jekot, Kalakund, Kali Sindh, Kansudhi, Karchha, Limkheda, Lokmanya Nagar, Malhargarh, Mangal Mahudi, Manglia Gaon, Morwani, Mukhtiara Balwada, Mohammadkhera, Naikheri, Namli, Naranjipur, Nauganwan, Nimar Kheri, Pachwan, Palia, Palsora Makrawa, Panch Pipila, Parbati, Patal Pani, Phanda, Pingleshwar, Piplia, Piplod, Piploda Bagla, Pir Umrod, Ranyal Jasmiya, Raoti, Rau, Rentia, Runija, Runkhera, Sanawad, Sant Road, Shambhupura, Tajpur, Tarana Road, Tihi, Unhel, USRA, Vikramnagar.
F halt station	20	Ajitkhedi, Balauda Takun, Bhatisuda, Bisalwas Kalan, Chakrod, Chintaman Ganesh, Donta, Kachnara Road, Kisoni, Kotla Kheri, Gambhiri Road, Lekoda, Pirjhalar, Pirjhalar, Pritam Nagar, Saifee Nagar, Shivpura, Sunderabad, Undasa Madhopur
Total	120	-
