= Fatehabad Chandrawatiganj Junction railway station =

Railway station in Madhya Pradesh

Fatehabad Chandrawatiganj Junction

General information
- Location: Fatehabad Chandrawatiganj, Ujjain; India
- Coordinates: 23.010591°N 75.67399°E
- Elevation: 514 metres (1,686 ft)
- System: Indian Railways station
- Owner: Indian Railways
- Operator: Western Railway
- Lines: Fatehabad Chandrawatiganj-Ujjain section Akola–Ratlam line
- Platforms: 3
- Tracks: 4 (single Diesel BG)
- Connections: Taxi stand, auto stand

Construction
- Parking: Yes
- Cycle facilities: Yes

Other information
- Status: Functioning
- Station code: FTD
- Zone(s): Western Railway
- Division(s): Ratlam

History
- Rebuilt: 2015

Services
Preceding station	Indian Railways	Following station
Ajnod towards ?	Western Railway zone Fatehabad Chandrawatiganj-Ujjain section	Lekoda towards ?
Ajnod towards ?	Western Railway zone Akola–Ratlam line	Osra towards ?
Location
- Interactive map

Fatehabad Chandrawatiganj Junction (station code: FTD) is a railway station in Ujjain. The station was previously used as a meter-gauge station on Ratlam–Indore line. Fatehabad has a connecting route to Ujjain Junction on a meter-gauge line.

In 2015, Ratlam–Indore was converted into broad-gauge line, directly connecting Indore and Ratlam.

Fatehabad and Chandrawati Ganj are two villages on the Indore–Ujjain district border. Fatehabad village is under the Ujjain district and Chandrawati Ganj village is under the Indore district.

As of November 2021, the gauge-conversion of Fatehabad-Ujjain via Chintaman station has been completed and Ujjain - Indore MEMU Special is operating on the route.

== Major trains ==
These trains pass through the station.

Number	Train	Type
09351/09352; 09353/09354	Ujjain - Indore MEMU Special	MEMU
09347/09348; 09389/09390; 09535/09536; 09547/09548	Dr. Ambedkar Nagar - Ratlam DEMU	Local
14801/14802	Jodhpur - Indore Express	Express
19337/19338	Indore - Delhi Sarai Rohilla Weekly Express	Express
19333/19334	Indore - Bikaner Mahamana Express	Mahamana
11125/11126	Ratlam–Gwalior Intercity Express	Express
20973/20974	Ajmer–Rameswaram Humsafar Express	Humsafar
21125/21126	Ratlam - Bhind Express	Express

== See also ==
- Indore Junction
- Ujjain Junction
