= Ratlam Junction railway station =

Railway station in Madhya Pradesh

Ratlam Junction
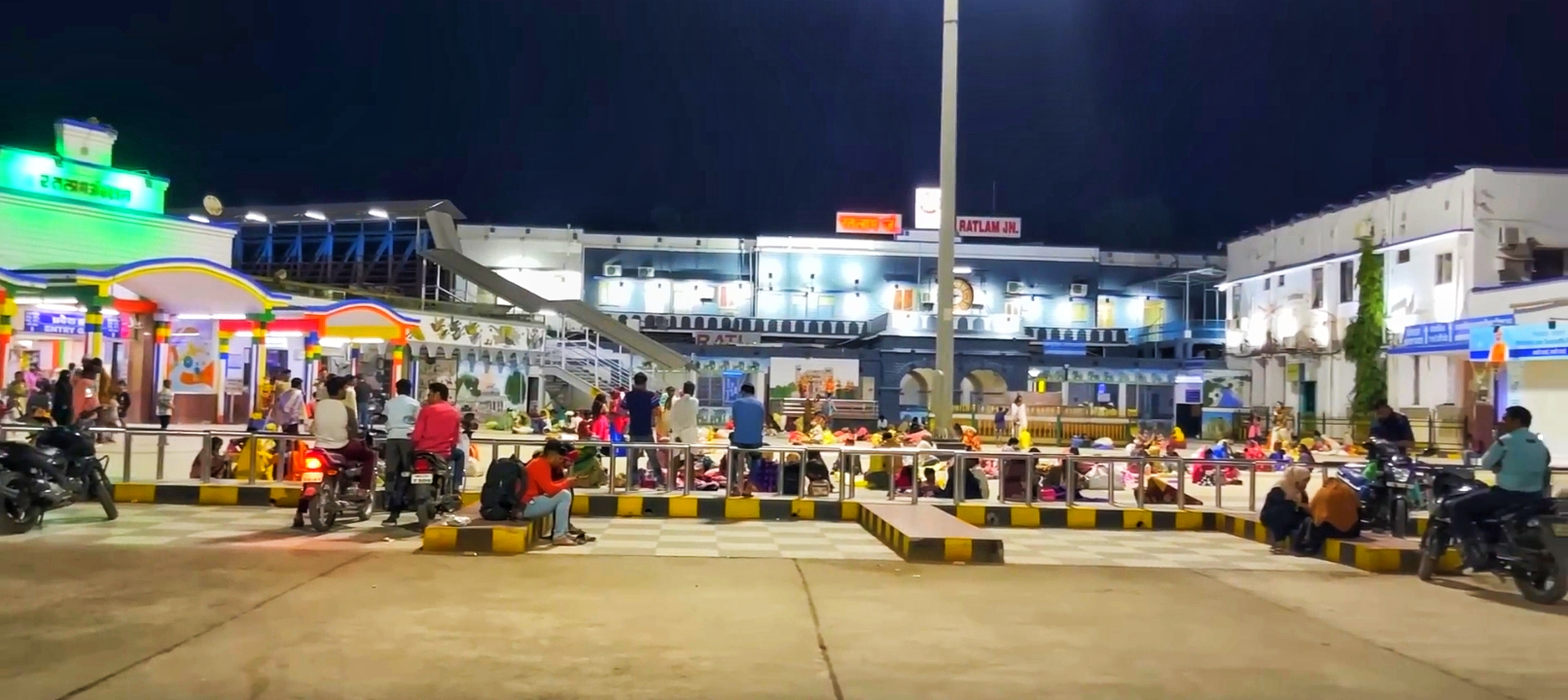
- Ratlam Junction Railway Station

General information
- Location: Station Road, Ratlam, Madhya Pradesh; India
- Coordinates: 23°20′27″N 75°03′04″E
- Elevation: 493 metres (1,617 ft)
- System: Indian Railways station
- Owner: Indian Railways
- Operator: Western Railway
- Lines: New Delhi–Mumbai main line, Ratlam–Vadodara section
- Platforms: 6
- Tracks: 10

Construction
- Structure type: Standard (on ground)
- Parking: Yes
- Accessible: Available

Other information
- Status: Functioning
- Station code: RTM
- Zone(s): Western Railway
- Division(s): Ratlam
Location
- Location within Madhya Pradesh Location within India

Ratlam Junction railway station is a major rail junction on the New Delhi–Mumbai main line of Indian Railways. Ratlam is NSG-3 – category railway station of Western Railway Zone of Indian Railways. Its code is RTM. It serves Ratlam city. The station consists of seven platforms.

Ratlam is well connected by rail to Kota, New Delhi, Badaun, Bareilly, Mumbai, Ahmedabad, Bangalore, Hyderabad, Chennai, Nagpur, Bhopal, Ujjain, Gwalior, Saugor, Jhansi Vadodara, Bilaspur, Jammu, Howrah, Chittorgarh, Jodhpur, Jaipur, Ajmer, Gwalior, Bhind, Gaya, Bikaner, Chennai, Guwahati, Gadarwara, Katni, Veraval, Kolkata, Bhuj, Bhavnagar Terminus, Rajkot, Bikaner and Okha

== Administration ==
Ratlam is a major junction and divisional headquarter of Western Railway. Ratlam Division came into existence on 15 August 1956.

== Gallery ==
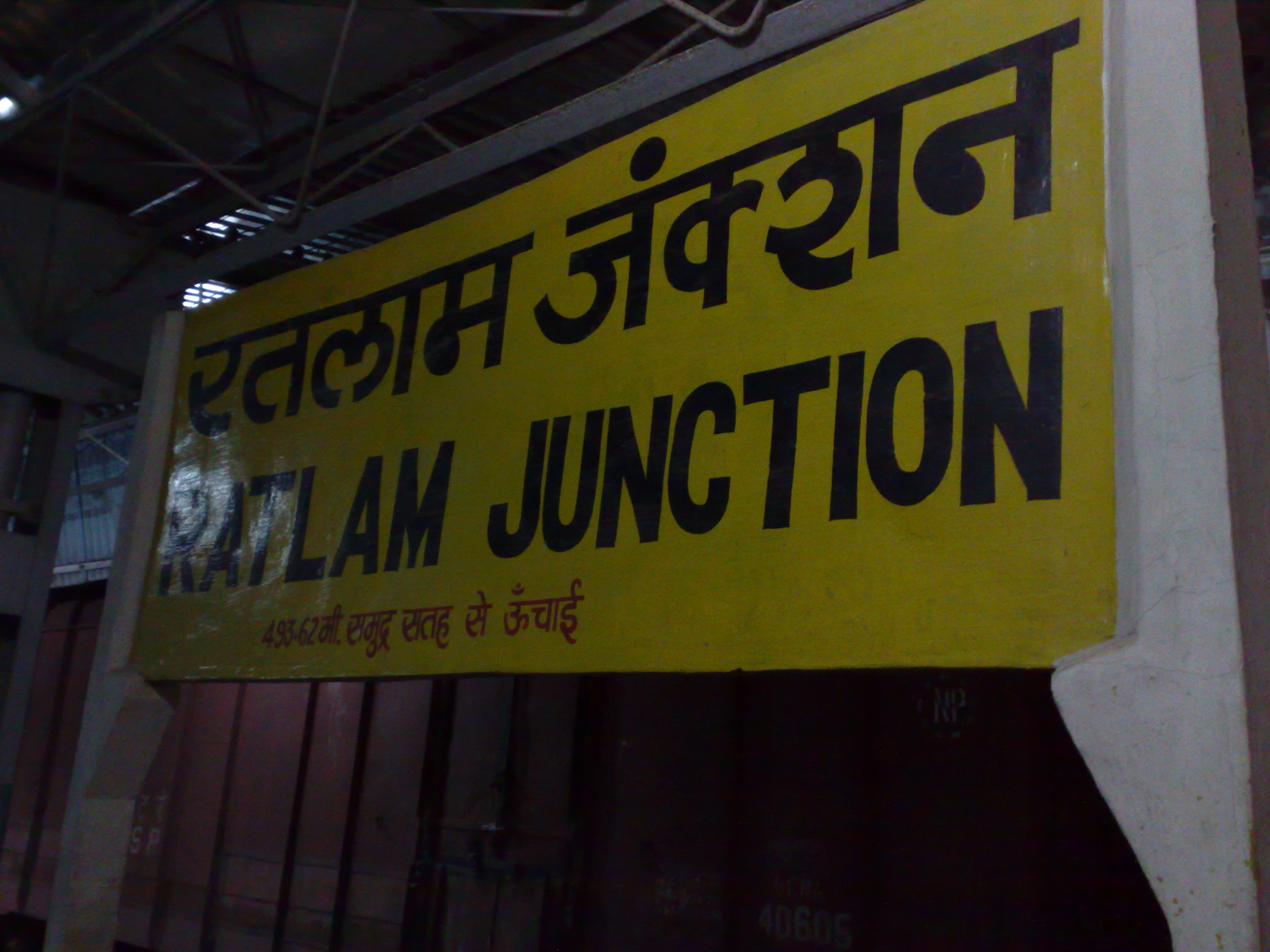
Ratlam Junction

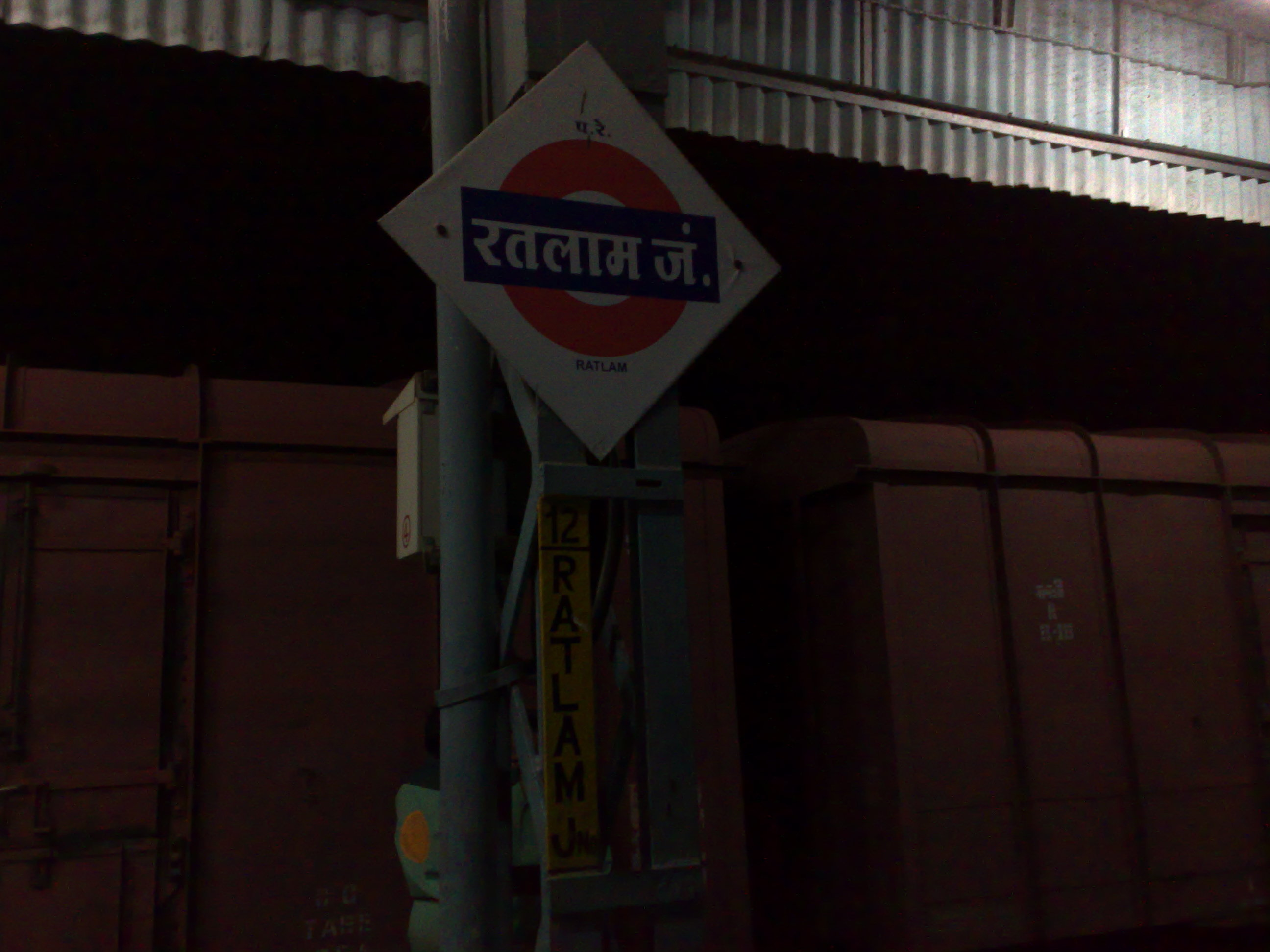
Ratlam Junction
