= Raishree railway station =

Railway station in Madhya Pradesh, India

Raishree

General information
- Location: Railway Crossing Road, Pipar Sama, Shivpuri district, Madhya Pradesh; India
- Coordinates: 25°21′43″N 77°35′31″E
- Elevation: 475 m (1,558 ft)
- System: Passenger train station
- Owner: Indian Railways
- Operator: West Central Railway
- Line: Indore–Gwalior line
- Platforms: 1
- Tracks: 1

Construction
- Structure type: Standard (on ground station)

Other information
- Status: Active
- Station code: RSRI
- Zone(s): West Central Railway zone
- Division(s): Bhopal

History
- Opened: 1899
- Former names: Gwalior Light Railway

Services
| Preceding station | Indian Railways | Following station |
|---|---|---|
| Shivpuri towards ? | West Central Railway zone Indore–Gwalior line | Khonker towards ? |
Location

Raishree railway station is a railway station on Indore–Gwalior line under the Bhopal railway division of West Central Railway zone. This is situated beside Railway Crossing Road at Pipar Sama in Shivpuri district of the Indian state of Madhya Pradesh.
