= Kapaliya =

Village in Madhya Pradesh, India

- Village
- Country: India
- State: Madhya Pradesh
- District: Shajapur

Population
  - Total: 2,374
- Time zone: UTC+5:30 (IST)
- PIN: 465106

Kapaliya (कपलिया) is a village in Shajapur, Madhya Pradesh, India.

== Transport ==
Kapaliya is served by the Siroliya railway station on Indore–Gwalior line under the Bhopal railway division of West Central Railway zone.
