= Padarkheda railway station =

Railway station in Madhya Pradesh, India

Padarkheda

General information
- Location: Padar Kheda, Shivpuri district, Madhya Pradesh; India
- Coordinates: 25°42′20″N 77°38′34″E
- Elevation: 415 m (1,362 ft)
- System: Passenger train station
- Owner: Indian Railways
- Operator: West Central Railway
- Line: Indore–Gwalior line
- Platforms: 1
- Tracks: 1

Construction
- Structure type: Standard (on ground station)

Other information
- Status: Active
- Station code: PARH
- Zone(s): West Central Railway zone
- Division(s): Bhopal

History
- Opened: 1899
- Former names: Gwalior Light Railway

Services
| Preceding station | Indian Railways | Following station |
|---|---|---|
| Indargarh towards ? | West Central Railway zone Indore–Gwalior line | Khajri towards ? |
Location

Padarkheda railway station is a railway station on Indore–Gwalior line under the Bhopal railway division of West Central Railway zone. This is situated at Padar Kheda in Shivpuri district of the Indian state of Madhya Pradesh.
