= Sinduriya Kachari railway station =

Railway station in Madhya Pradesh, India

Sinduriya Kachari

General information
- Location: Kachari, Rajgarh district, Madhya Pradesh; India
- Coordinates: 24°01′16″N 76°55′33″E
- Elevation: 428 m (1,404 ft)
- System: Passenger train station
- Owner: Indian Railways
- Operator: West Central Railway
- Line: Indore–Gwalior line
- Platforms: 2
- Tracks: 1

Construction
- Structure type: Standard (on ground station)

Other information
- Status: Active
- Station code: SFZ
- Zone(s): West Central Railway zone
- Division(s): Bhopal

History
- Opened: 1899
- Former names: Gwalior Light Railway

Services
Preceding station	Indian Railways	Following station
Chachaura Binaganj towards ?	West Central Railway zone Indore–Gwalior line	Biyavra Rajgarh towards ?
Location

Sinduriya Kachari railway station is a railway station on the Indore–Gwalior line under the Bhopal railway division of the West Central Railway zone. It is situated at Kachari in Rajgarh district of the Indian state of Madhya Pradesh.
