= Chauhani railway station =

Railway station in Madhya Pradesh, India

Chauhani

General information
- Location: Akya, Chauhanee, Shajapur district, Madhya Pradesh; India
- Coordinates: 23°19′56″N 76°15′52″E
- Elevation: 478 m (1,568 ft)
- System: Passenger train station
- Owner: Indian Railways
- Operator: West Central Railway
- Line: Indore–Gwalior line
- Platforms: 1
- Tracks: 1

Construction
- Structure type: Standard (on ground station)

Other information
- Status: Active
- Station code: CAZ
- Zone(s): West Central Railway zone
- Division(s): Bhopal

History
- Opened: 1899
- Former names: Gwalior Light Railway

Services
Preceding station	Indian Railways	Following station
Shajapur towards ?	West Central Railway zone Indore–Gwalior line	Siroliya towards ?
Location

Sarangpur railway station is a railway station on Indore–Gwalior line under the Bhopal railway division of West Central Railway zone. This is situated at Akya, Chauhanee in Shajapur district of the Indian state of Madhya Pradesh.
