= Khajri railway station =

Railway station in Madhya Pradesh, India

Khajri

General information
- Location: Dhokal Basai, Khajri, Shivpuri district, Madhya Pradesh; India
- Coordinates: 25°33′48″N 77°37′01″E
- Elevation: 446 m (1,463 ft)
- System: Passenger train station
- Owner: Indian Railways
- Operator: West Central Railway
- Line: Indore–Gwalior line
- Platforms: 1
- Tracks: 1

Construction
- Structure type: Standard (on ground station)

Other information
- Status: Active
- Station code: KAW
- Zone(s): West Central Railway zone
- Division(s): Bhopal

History
- Opened: 1899
- Former names: Gwalior Light Railway

Services
Preceding station	Indian Railways	Following station
Padarkheda towards ?	West Central Railway zone Indore–Gwalior line	Shivpuri towards ?
Location

Khajri railway station is a railway station on Indore–Gwalior line under the Bhopal railway division of West Central Railway zone. This is situated at Dhokal Basai, Khajri in Shivpuri district of the Indian state of Madhya Pradesh.
