= Mahugarha railway station =

Railway station in Madhya Pradesh, India

Mahugarha

General information
- Location: State Highway 23, Barodiya Khurd, Guna district, Madhya Pradesh; India
- Coordinates: 24°37′40″N 77°14′30″E
- Elevation: 500 m (1,600 ft)
- System: Passenger train station
- Owner: Indian Railways
- Operator: West Central Railway
- Line: Indore–Gwalior line
- Platforms: 2
- Tracks: 1

Construction
- Structure type: Standard (on ground station)

Other information
- Status: Active
- Station code: MUGA
- Zone(s): West Central Railway zone
- Division(s): Bhopal

History
- Opened: 1899
- Former names: Gwalior Light Railway

Services
Preceding station	Indian Railways	Following station
Guna Junction towards ?	West Central Railway zone Indore–Gwalior line	Ruthiyai Junction towards ?
Location

Mahugarha railway station is a railway station on Indore–Gwalior line under the Bhopal railway division of West Central Railway zone. This is situated beside State Highway 23 at Barodiya Khurd at in Guna district of the Indian state of Madhya Pradesh.
