= Raghogarh-Vijaypur =

Raghogarh-Ruthiyai Rahgoogurh-Ruthiyai
- Town
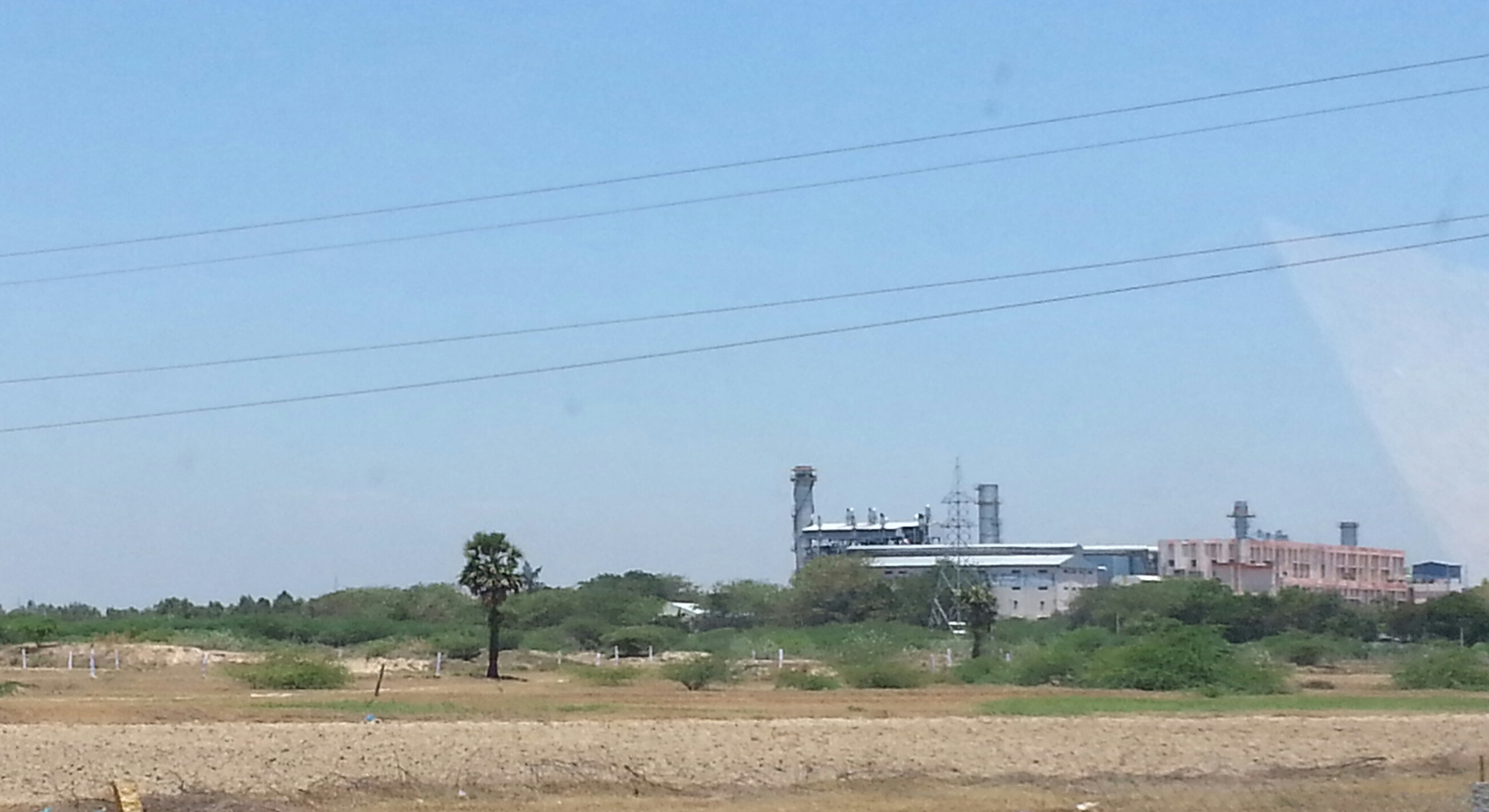
- GAIL Vijaypur

- Location in Madhya Pradesh, India
- Coordinates: 24°26′39″N 77°11′55″E
- Country: India
- State: Madhya Pradesh
- District: Guna
- Established: 1673A.D.
- Founder: Hindupat Raja Lal Singhji

Government
  - Member of Parliament: Rodmal Nagar, BJP (Rajgarh)
  - Member of Assembly: Jaivardhan Singh
  - Mayor: Aarti Mahendra Sharma
- Elevation: 448 m (1,470 ft)

Population (2011)
  - Total: 62,163

Languages
  - Official: Hindi
- Time zone: UTC+5:30 (IST)
- PIN: municipality (473226),(473110) Janpad Panchayat (473287)
- Telephone code: 91-7544
- Vehicle registration: MP-08

Raghogarh-Ruthiyai or Raghogarh-Vijaypur is a town and municipality in Guna district in the Indian state of Madhya Pradesh.

== History ==
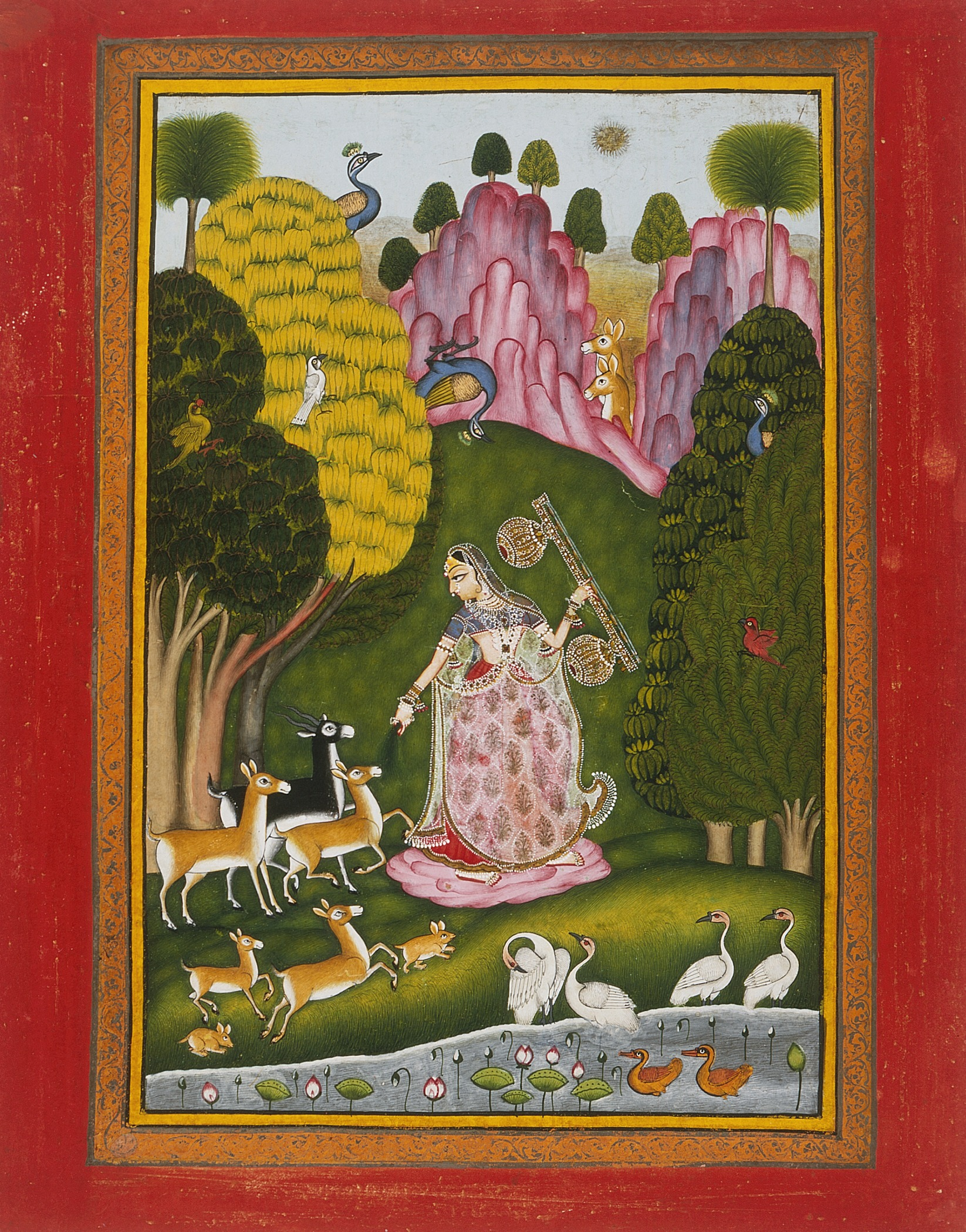
Certain arts were patronized by the states's rulers and flourished. One of the Ragamala paintings produced in Raghogarh.

The Kingdom of Raghogarh also refereed as Raghogarh State was established in 1673 by Lal Singh Khichi, a Rajput of the Chauhan Khichi clan, a branch of the clan to which Prithviraj Chauhan the founder of Delhi belonged. The state took its name from the fort of Raghogarh, founded in 1673 by Raja Lal Singh himself in 1677. Raja Lal Singh ruled Raghogarh until 1697 and was succeeded by Raja Dhiraj Singh of Raghogarh, He had great relations with Kachhwaha Rajput ruler Sawai Jai Singh Kachwaha of Amber (Jaipur) and Maharana Sangram Singh II of the Mewar. Raja Dhiraj Singh under the leadership of Sawai Jai Singh Kachwaha fought and defeated Maratha's in Battle of Pilsud along with other Rajput chiefs.

Raghogarh state prospered for a century, but saw its fortune wane owing to Maratha attacks led by Mahadaji Shinde around 1780.

By 1818 there were disputes regarding succession in Raghogarh, which were settled through the intervention of the British authorities.

== Geography ==
Raghogarh-ruthiyai is located at 24°26′39″N 77°11′55″E It has an average elevation of 448 metres.

Raghogarh-ruthiyai in Guna district of Madhya Pradesh is the gateway of Malwa and Chambal. It is located on the north-eastern part of Malwa Plateau. Western boundary is well defined by Parbati and chopet river. Parbati and chopet is the main river flowing along the western boundary touching Rajgarh District of Madhya Pradesh, and Jhalawarh and Kota Districts of Rajasthan. Kota is located in north and the cities Vidisha, Bhopal and Rajgarh lie to the South.

== Climate ==
Raghogarh-Ruthiyai has a sub-tropical climate with hot summers from late March to early July, the humid monsoon season from late June to early October, and a cool dry winter from early November to late February. Summers start in late March, and along with other cities like Nagpur and Delhi, are among the hottest in India and the world. Temperatures peak in May and June with daily averages being around 33–35 °C (91–95 °F), and end in late June with the onset of the monsoon. Raghogarh-Ruthiyai receives 970 mm (38 in) of rain every year, most of which is concentrated in the monsoon months from late June to early October. August is the wettest month with about 310 mm (12 in) of rain. Winter in Raghogarh-Ruthiyai starts in late October, and is generally very mild with daily temperatures averaging in the 14–16 °C (57–61 °F) range, and mostly dry and sunny conditions. January is the coldest month with average lows in the range 5–7 °C (41–45 °F) and occasional cold snaps that plummet temperatures to close to freezing.

== Location ==
Raghogarh-Ruthiyai is about 180 km north of Bhopal, the capital of state of Madhya Pradesh and is about 30 km from Guna town, which is the district headquarters. The nearest railway station is Ruthiyai Junction railway station.

== Demographics ==
As of the 2011 Census of India, Raghogarh-Ruthiyai had a population of 62,163.

== Education ==
=== Colleges ===
- Jaypee University of Engineering and Technology
- Govt. Degree College, Raghogarh
- Govt. Polytechnic College, Pagara (Ruthiyai)
- Govt. I.T.I., Raghogarh
- Hindupat Industrial Training Institute (HITI), Raghogarh
- Hindupat Computer Training Institute (HCTI), Raghogarh
- Swami Vivekanand college ruthiyai

=== schools- ===
- Sri Sathya Sai Vidya Vihar, GAIL Vijaipur(
- St. Mary's High School, Daurana
- Kendriya Vidyalay, GAIL Vijaipur
- Hindupat Public School, Raghogarh
- DPS, NFL Campus

== Main festivals ==
Aside from the general religious festivals that are widely celebrated, such as Holi and Diwali, there are many local ones. These include Nag-Panchmi, Shreenath Mahadji Maharaj Punyatithi, Gangaur, Teej, Gudi Padwa (Marathi New Year), Navratri, and Durga Puja.

Tejaji (also called veer maharaj) ka mela is also celebrated in bhamawad village and rajnakhedi village.

Raghogarh- Ruthiyai also celebrates Rang Panchami quite differently. This festival is celebrated five days after Dulendi or Holi. This is also celebrated like Dulendi, but colours are mixed with water and then either sprinkled or poured on others.

== Industries ==
Though Raghogarh-Ruthiyai is very small nondescript town, it is still an important industrial centre. Some of the major industries are:

- National Fertilizers Limited, Vijaypur ruthiyai
- Gas Authority of India Limited, Vijaipur
- Sugar Factory, Narayanpura
- Katta Factory Chunawatti ruthiyai
- IOCL Bottling Plant, Vijaipur ruthiyai

== Famous people ==
- Digvijaya Singh, politician
- Lakshman Singh (politician), politician.
- Jaivardhan Singh, politician
- { Raj Sharma From Belka..}

== Raghogarh- ruthiyai constituency ==
Raghogarh-Ruthiyai Vidhan Sabha constituency is one of the 230 Vidhan Sabha (Legislative Assembly) constituencies of Madhya Pradesh state in central India. This constituency came into existence in 1951, as one of the 79 Vidhan Sabha constituencies of the erstwhile Madhya Bharat state.

Raghogarh-Ruthiyai (constituency number 31) is one of the four Vidhan Sabha constituencies located in Guna district. This constituency covers parts of Raghogarh-ruthiyai and Aron tehsils.

Raghogarh-Ruthiyai is part of Rajgarh Lok Sabha constituency along with seven other Vidhan Sabha segments, namely, Chachoura in this district, Narsinghgarh, Biaora, Rajgarh, Khilchipur and Sarangpur in Rajgarh district and Susner in Shajapur district.

== Transportation and connectivity ==
Raghogarh-Ruthiyai is not connected to main cities of the state around India by railways and roadways. Raghogarh railway station and Vijay Pur railway station are situated near the area.

Raghogarh-Ruthiyai is flag station lies in WCR. Ruthiyai junction is the nearest major station which is located under municipality. Ruthiyai is 15 km away from the town. Other important main transportation hub is Guna. Ruthiyai is the part of Kota–Bina section and Maksi–Etawa railway section of Western Central Railway. One can reach Raghogarh-Ruthiyai by airways too, the nearest airport to Raghogarh is Bhopal Airport, Indore Airport and Gwalior Airport. Raghogarh-Ruthiyai is situated by the major district roads (MDR). It is Well connected with Guna, Aron and Maksudangarh. Ruthiyai is situated on the Western-Central Railway 's broad gauge line of the Kota–Bina Section and Maksi–Etawa Section.

Raghogarh-Ruthiyai is well connected by road from Indore Bhopal and Gwalior. The NH-3 Agra Bombay highway is 3 km and NH-12 J.J. Road is 65 km from Raghogarh-Ruthiyai. The nearest airport is Gwalior.
