= Sanchi railway station =

Railway station in Madhya Pradesh, India

Sanchi
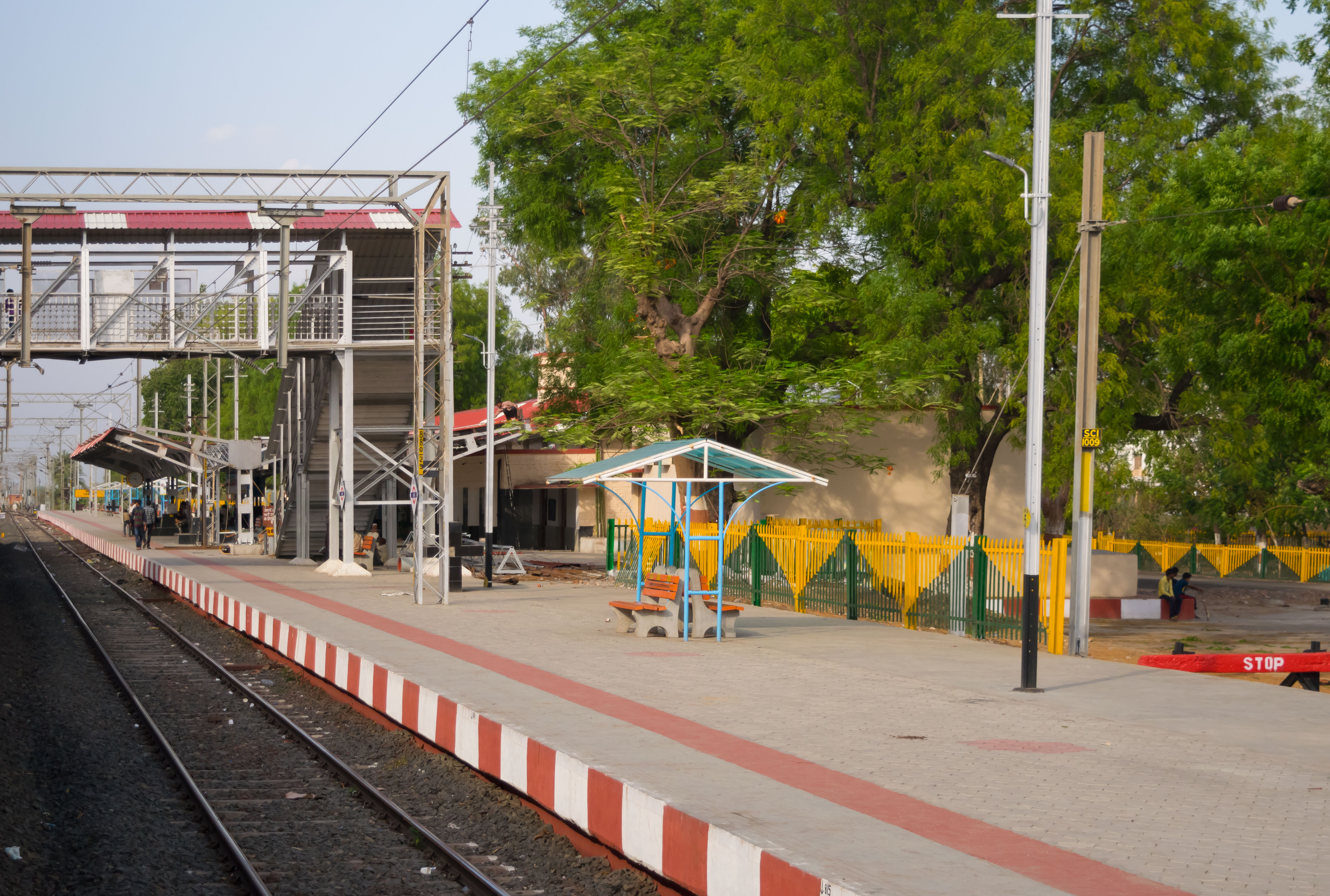

General information
- Location: Sanchi Town, Raisen district, Madhya Pradesh; India
- Coordinates: 23.4877°N 77.7359°E
- Elevation: 427 metres (1,401 ft)
- System: Indian Railways station
- Owner: Indian Railways
- Operator: West Central Railway
- Line: Agra–Bhopal section
- Platforms: 2
- Tracks: 4
- Connections: Auto stand

Construction
- Structure type: Standard (on-ground station)
- Parking: No
- Cycle facilities: No

Other information
- Status: Functioning
- Station code: SCI
- Zone(s): West Central Railway
- Division(s): Bhopal
Location
- Location within India Location within Madhya Pradesh

Sanchi railway station is a small railway station in Raisen district, Madhya Pradesh. Its code is SCI. It serves Sanchi Town. The station consists of two platforms, neither well sheltered. It lacks many facilities including water and sanitation. The station is located around 1.5 km away from UNESCO World Heritage Site of Sanchi stupas.

In October 2014, it was announced that Sanchi railway station will become a multi-functional complex and will be equipped with various amenities for travellers.
