= Kolaras railway station =

Railway station in Madhya Pradesh, India

Kolaras

General information
- Location: Tighariya, Kolaras, Shivpuri district, Madhya Pradesh; India
- Coordinates: 25°13′30″N 77°35′25″E
- Elevation: 447 m (1,467 ft)
- System: Passenger train station
- Owner: Indian Railways
- Operator: West Central Railway
- Line: Indore–Gwalior line
- Platforms: 1
- Tracks: 1

Construction
- Structure type: Standard (on ground station)

Other information
- Status: Active
- Station code: KLRS
- Zone(s): West Central Railway zone
- Division(s): Bhopal

History
- Opened: 1899
- Former names: Gwalior Light Railway

Services
Preceding station	Indian Railways	Following station
Khonker towards ?	West Central Railway zone Indore–Gwalior line	Lukwasa towards ?
Location

Kolaras railway station is a railway station on Indore–Gwalior line under the Bhopal railway division of West Central Railway zone. This is situated at Tighariya, Kolaras in Shivpuri district of the Indian state of Madhya Pradesh.
