= Raghogarh railway station =

Railway station in Madhya Pradesh, India

Raghogarh

General information
- Location: Raghogarh-Vijaypur, Guna district, Madhya Pradesh; India
- Coordinates: 24°26′08″N 77°09′17″E
- Elevation: 417 m (1,368 ft)
- System: Passenger train station
- Owner: Indian Railways
- Operator: West Central Railway
- Line: Indore–Gwalior line
- Platforms: 1
- Tracks: 1

Construction
- Structure type: Standard (on ground station)

Other information
- Status: Active
- Station code: RGG
- Zone(s): West Central Railway zone
- Division(s): Bhopal

History
- Opened: 1899
- Former names: Gwalior Light Railway

Services
Preceding station	Indian Railways	Following station
Vijay Pur towards ?	West Central Railway zone Indore–Gwalior line	Kumbhraj towards ?
Location

Raghogarh railway station is a railway station on Indore–Gwalior line under the Bhopal railway division of West Central Railway zone. This is situated at Raghogarh-Vijaypur in Guna district of the Indian state of Madhya Pradesh.
