= Sarangpur, Madhya Pradesh =

Sarangpur
- City
- Location in Madhya Pradesh, India Sarangpur (India)
- Coordinates: 23.57°N 76.47°E
- Country: India
- State: Madhya Pradesh
- District: Rajgarh
- Founder: Sheikh Sarang
- Elevation: 410 m (1,350 ft)

Population (2011)
  - Total: 37,435 Muslim−49% Hindu−50% Others−1%

Languages
  - Official: Hindi
- Time zone: UTC+5:30 (IST)
- Postal code: 465697
- ISO 3166 code: IN-MP
- Vehicle registration: MP-39-MP

Sarangpur is a city and tehsil in Rajgarh district in the Indian state of Madhya Pradesh. It is situated at the bank of the river Kali Sindh.

Sarangpur is a town in Sarangpur Tehsil in Rajgarh District of Madhya Pradesh, India. It belongs to Bhopal Division. It is located 65 km south of the District Headquarters Rajgarh. It is a tehsil headquarters. Sarangpur's PIN code is 465697 and postal head office is Sarangpur. Taleni (4 km), Taraganj (5 km), Tarlakhedi (5 km), Kachhikhedi (5 km), Balodi (6 km) are the nearby villages to Sarangpur. Sarangpur is surrounded by Sarangpur Tehsil to the north, Shajapur Tehsil to the south, Nalkheda Tehsil to the west, and Shujalpur Tehsil to the south. Sarangpur, Pachore, Shajapur, and Shujalpur are the nearby cities to Sarangpur. It is on the border of the Rajgarh District and Shajapur District. Shajapur District Moman Badodia is west of this city .Sarangpur is represented by Sarangpur Assembly constituency (no. 164) in madhya pradesh vidhan sabha.

== Geography ==
Sarangpur is located at 23.57°N 76.47°E. It has an average elevation of 410 metres (1345 feet).

== History ==
Sarangpur was founded by Shaikh Sarang, one of the famous amirs Firuz Shah Tughlaq. It is counted on the list of oldest historical places. Baz Bahadur and Rani Rupmati ruled the city; they were the rulers of Mandwa, Madhya Pradesh. The war between Baz Bahadur and Akbar the Great also occurred in Sarangpur. In that war, Akbar defeated Baz Bahadur and ruled the city. There was also a battle held at Sarangpur in which Rajput king Rana Kumbha of Mewar attacked Malwa sultan Mahmud Khalji who was joined by Ahmed Shah, the sultan of Gujarat, leading to Rajput victory over the Malwa Sultanate. Sultan Mahmud Khilji was taken prisoner after this battle

== Demographics ==
As of the 2011 Census of India, Sarangpur had a population of 37,435. Males constitute 52% of the population and females 48%. Sarangpur has an average literacy rate of 74.54%, higher than the national average of 69.32%: male literacy is 81.79%, and female literacy is 66.87%. In Sarangpur, 14.67% of the population is under six years of age.

== Known for ==
- Baz Bahadur and Rani Rupmati's Tomb: the symbol of their love is a famous tourist place in this town.
- Jama Masjid of Sarangpur is one of the largest and oldest mosque in India.

.

- Kapileshwar Mandir is an ancient temple situated in the middle of Kali Sindh River.
- Shah Manjhan, medieval Islamic scholar
- Tomb of Pir Mithhe Shah Wali located near Eidgah is also a prominent religious place.

== Transport ==
Bus service is available in Sarangpur. Sarangpur is serveced by Agra Mumbai National Highway ( formerly NH3) now renamed as NH 52. It is 126 km from Indore, the business capital of Madhya Pradesh. It is 160 km from Bhopal, the capital. Sarangpur railway station is situated on Indore–Gwalior line under the Bhopal railway division of West Central Railway zone.
