= Vijay Pur railway station =

Railway station in Madhya Pradesh, India

Vijay Pur

General information
- Location: National Highway 46, Vijaipur, Guna district, Madhya Pradesh; India
- Coordinates: 24°29′35″N 77°09′45″E
- Elevation: 420 m (1,380 ft)
- System: Passenger train station
- Owner: Indian Railways
- Operator: West Central Railway
- Line: Indore–Gwalior line
- Platforms: 1
- Tracks: 1

Construction
- Structure type: Standard (on ground station)

Other information
- Status: Active
- Station code: VJP
- Zone(s): West Central Railway zone
- Division(s): Bhopal

History
- Opened: 1899
- Former names: Gwalior Light Railway

Services
Preceding station	Indian Railways	Following station
Ruthiyai Junction towards ?	West Central Railway zone Indore–Gwalior line	Raghogarh towards ?
Location

Vijay Pur railway station is a railway station on Indore–Gwalior line under the Bhopal railway division of West Central Railway zone. This is situated beside National Highway 46 at Vijaipur in Guna district of the Indian state of Madhya Pradesh.
