= Siroliya railway station =

Railway station in Madhya Pradesh, India

Siroliya

General information
- Location: Sihoda, Tehsil Shajapur, Shajapur district, Madhya Pradesh; India
- Coordinates: 23°18′20″N 76°13′32″E
- System: Passenger train station
- Owner: Indian Railways
- Operator: West Central Railway
- Line: Indore–Gwalior line
- Platforms: 1
- Tracks: 1

Construction
- Structure type: Standard (on ground station)

Other information
- Status: Active
- Station code: SYO
- Zone(s): West Central Railway zone
- Division(s): Bhopal

History
- Opened: 1899
- Former names: Gwalior Light Railway

Services
Preceding station	Indian Railways	Following station
Chauhani towards ?	West Central Railway zone Indore–Gwalior line	Maksi Junction towards ?
Location

Siroliya railway station is a railway station on Indore–Gwalior line under the Bhopal railway division of West Central Railway zone. This is situated at Tehsil Shajapur, Sihoda in Shajapur district of the Indian state of Madhya Pradesh.
