= Gulabganj railway station =

Railway station in Madhya Pradesh, India

Gulabganj

General information
- Location: Gulabganj, Vidisha district, Madhya Pradesh; India
- Coordinates: 23°41′02″N 77°54′43″E
- Elevation: 433 metres (1,421 ft)
- System: Indian Railways station
- Owner: Indian Railways
- Operator: West Central Railway
- Line: Agra–Bhopal section
- Platforms: 4
- Tracks: 4

Construction
- Structure type: Standard (on ground)
- Parking: Yes

Other information
- Status: Functioning
- Station code: GLG
- Zone(s): West Central Railway
- Division(s): Bhopal
Location
- Location within India Location within Madhya Pradesh

Gulabganj railway station is a railway station in Vidisha district, Madhya Pradesh. Its code is GLG. It serves Gulabganj town. The station consists of four platforms. It lacks many facilities including water and sanitation. Passenger and Express trains halt here.
