= Vijaipur =

- Town
- Location within Madhya Pradesh
- Coordinates: 24.484°N 77.157°E
- Country: India
- District: Guna District
- State: Madhya Pradesh
- Time zone: UTC+5:30 (Indian Standard Time (IST))
- PIN code: 473112
- Area code: 7544

Vijaipur is a town in Guna district of Madhya Pradesh in India.

== Education ==
Schools located in Vijaipur include:

- Delhi Public School, Vijaipur
- Sri Sathya Sai Vidya Vihar, Vijaipur
- Kendriya Vidyalaya, Vijaipur

== Economy ==
Vijaipur is primarily known as the site of one of India's largest fertilizer plants, owned and operated by National Fertilizers Limited.

The Hazira-Vijaipur-Jagdishpur (HVJ) natural gas pipeline of GAIL made the town well known in India.

== Transport ==
Vijay Pur railway station is the main railway station of Vijaipur situated on Indore–Gwalior line under the Bhopal railway division. The nearest airport is the Raja Bhoj Airport located approximately 177 kilometres via NH 46.
