= Rail transport in Madhya Pradesh =

Rail transport in Indian state

Rail transport in Madhya Pradesh began in the year 1867 when Allahabad–Jabalpur branch line was opened in June 1867. The Etarsi to Jabalpur section was opened on 7 March 1870 by GIPR, linking up with EIR track at Jabalpur from Allahabad, and establishing connectivity between Mumbai and Kolkata. In 1903, with the introduction of Delhi-Chennai rail route through the state and Bhopal Junction railway station, the state got a good rail connectivity. Presently major portion of the state's rail connectivity is provided by the railway zone called West Central Railway.

== Railway zones ==
The major railway zone of the state is West Central Railways, whose headquarters are at Jabalpur. Besides WCR some part of the state is served by WR (Western Railway), CR (Central Railway), NCR

=== Divisions ===
- Western Railways– Ratlam
- West Central Railways – Jabalpur & Bhopal

==== Sub Divisions ====
The rail route of 7 divisions passes through Madhya Pradesh state, which is the highest in Indian Railways Network for any state.

- Central Railway - Khandwa
- North Central Railway - Gwalior
- East Central Railway - Singrauli
- South East Central Railway - Balaghat
- West Central Railway - Satna
- Western Railway - Indore
- North Western Railway - Nimach

== Railway stations ==
Presently, the state of Madhya Pradesh has more than 723 major and minor railway stations. The Jabalpur, Bhopal (main railway station of Bhopal) and Rani Kamalapati (a suburban railway station in Bhopal) are considered as the best railway stations of M. P. with several passenger facilities. Besides these railway stations, Indore, Gwalior, Itarsi, Narmadapuram, Satna, Katni, Ujjain, Sehore, Sagar and Khajuraho railway stations are considered to be the "Adarsh Railway Station" or "Ideal" railway stations. These ideal railway stations are provided with all the common passenger facilities. Some major cities in Madhya Pradesh have more than one railway stations. For instance, Indore, the major city and commercial capital of the state has more than 11 local railway stations such as Indore (Main), Lakshmibai Nagar, Rajendra Nagar, Lokmanya Nagar, Gwalior has 7 local stations while Bhopal has 5 local railway stations.

== Railway junctions ==
The following are the 13 major junction railway stations in Madhya Pradesh :-

S. No.	Division	Zone	No. of junctions	Names of junctions
1	Ratlam	WR	6	Indore Junction, Nagda Junction, Dewas Junction; Ratlam Junction, Khandwa Junction, Ujjain Junction Maksi Junction
2	Jabalpur	WCR	3	Jabalpur Junction, Satna Junction, Katni Junction
3	Bhopal	WCR	4	Bhopal Junction, Bina Junction, Itarsi Junction, Guna Junction

== Upcoming railway stations ==
- Karera
- Kannod
- Chhapra
- Panna railway station
- Dinara
- Khategao
- Pithampur
- Seodha
- Dhar
- Rajgarh
- Narsinghgarh
- Chanderi

== Upcoming railway junctions ==
- Budni
- Biyaora
- Rau
- Mangalia gaon
- Rayaru
- Shivpuri
- Seopur

== See also ==
- Bhopal Shatabdi
- Indore Duronto
- Madhya Pradesh Sampark Kranti
- Bhopal Express
