= Badarwas =

- Town
- Location in Madhya Pradesh, India Badarwas (India)
- Coordinates: 24.97°N 77.57°E
- Country: India
- State: Madhya Pradesh
- District: Shivpuri
- Elevation: 471 m (1,545 ft)

Population (2001)
  - Total: 10,408

Languages
  - Official: Hindi
- Time zone: UTC+5:30 (IST)
- 473885: 473885
- ISO 3166 code: IN-MP
- Vehicle registration: MP

Badarwas is a town and a nagar panchayat in Shivpuri district in the state of Madhya Pradesh, India. Badarwas is also known as Jacket Capital of India.

== History ==
Badarwas is a town in the Shivpuri district of Madhya Pradesh. Over the years, the area has grown with the development of nearby villages and local facilities. Today, Badarwas serves the people living in the surrounding rural areas.

Lal Sahab Yadav was a respected and popular local leader, remembered for his dedication to public service and commitment to the development of the community.

== Geography ==
Badarwas is located at 24.97°N 77.57°E. It has an average elevation of 471 metres (1,545 feet).

== Demographics ==
As of 2001 India census, Badarwas is the Jacket capital city of India, and had a population of 10,408. Males constitute 52% of the population and females 48%. Badarwas has an average literacy rate of 62%, higher than the national average of 59.5%; with 61% of the males and 39% of females literate. 17% of the population is under 6 years of age.

== Transport ==
Badarwas railway station is situated at Badarwas on Indore–Gwalior line under the Bhopal railway division. The nearest airport is Gwalior.
