= Kamta Prasad Khatik =

Indian politician

Member of the Madhya Pradesh Legislative Assembly
- In office 1977–1980
- Succeeded by: Pooran Singh Kanhaiyalal
- Constituency: Kolaras, Madhya Pradesh

Personal details
- Born: 1 January 1957 (age 69) Madhya Pradesh
- Party: Janata Party
- Occupation: Politician
- Profession: Farmer & politician

Kamta Prasad Khatik also known as Kamta Prasad is an Indian politician belonging to Janata Party. He is a former member of the Madhya Pradesh Legislative Assembly, representing Kolaras constituency in 1977.
