= Timarni railway station =

Railway station in Madhya Pradesh, India

Timarni

General information
- Location: Timarni, Harda district, Madhya Pradesh; India
- Coordinates: 22°22′34″N 77°13′48″E
- System: Indian Railways station
- Owner: Indian Railways
- Operator: West Central Railway
- Line: Jabalpur–Bhusaval section
- Platforms: 3
- Tracks: 3

Construction
- Structure type: Standard (on ground)
- Parking: Yes

Other information
- Status: Functioning
- Station code: TBN
- Zone(s): West Central Railway
- Division(s): Bhopal
Location
- Location within India Location within Madhya Pradesh

Timarni railway station is a railway station in Harda district, Madhya Pradesh. Its code is TBN. It serves Timarni town. The station consists of three platforms. It lacks many facilities including water and sanitation. Both Passenger and Express trains halt at this station.
