= Kolaras =

Kolaras Kabilashpur Kabilashpur
- city
- Location in Madhya Pradesh, India Kolaras (India)
- Coordinates: 25.23°N 77.6°E
- Country: India
- State: Madhya Pradesh
- District: Shivpuri
- Elevation: 460 m (1,510 ft)

Population (2001)
  - Total: 15,674

Languages
  - Official: Hindi
- Time zone: UTC+5:30 (IST)
- Postal code: 473770
- ISO 3166 code: IN-MP
- Vehicle registration: MP-33

Kolaras is a town and a nagar parishad in Shivpuri district in the Indian state of Madhya Pradesh. Kolaras is located on NH3 (Agra-Bomabay highway) presently called NH46. It is religious city and famous with name mini vrindavan. It came to be known as mini vrindavan because of its religious people one Saint name bhori sakhi takes his deeksha from a guru from the temple gopal ji mandir which is related to radhavallabh sampradaya and this temple is about 400 to 500 years old temple and the Kolaras have small streets like vrindavan

== Geography ==
Kolaras is located at 25.23°N 77.6°E. It has an average elevation of 460 metres (1,509 feet).

== Demographics ==
As of 2001 India census, Kolaras had a population of 15,674. Males constitute 53% of the population and females 47%. Kolaras has an average literacy rate of 58%, lower than the national average of 59.5%: male literacy is 67%, and female literacy is 47%. In Kolaras, 17% of the population is under 6 years of age.

== Transport ==
Kolaras railway station is situated at Kolaras town on Indore–Gwalior line under the Bhopal railway division.
