= Mandideep railway station =

Railway station in Madhya Pradesh

Mandideep

General information
- Location: Dahod Road, Ward no.23, Mandideep, Raisen district, Madhya Pradesh; India
- Coordinates: 23.0987029°N 77.5050016°E
- Elevation: 452 metres (1,483 ft)
- System: Indian Railways station
- Owner: Indian Railways
- Operator: West Central Railway
- Line: Bhopal–Nagpur section
- Platforms: 2
- Tracks: 4
- Connections: Auto stand

Construction
- Structure type: Standard (on ground)
- Parking: No
- Cycle facilities: No

Other information
- Status: Functioning
- Station code: MDDP
- Zone(s): West Central Railway
- Division(s): Bhopal
Location
- Location within Uttar Pradesh Location within India

Mandideep railway station is a small railway station in Raisen district, Madhya Pradesh. Its code is MDDP. It serves Mandideep city. The station consists of two platforms. The platforms are well sheltered. It has well many facilities including water, WiFi and sanitation. It has two foot overbridges.

== Major trains ==
- Narmada Express
- Panchvalley Fast Passenger
- Itarsi–Jhansi Passenger
- Mumbai CST–Amritsar Express
- Kushinagar Express
