= Dewanganj railway station =

Railway station in Madhya Pradesh, India

Dewanganj

General information
- Location: Dewanganj, Raisen district, Madhya Pradesh; India
- Coordinates: 23°25′43″N 77°35′33″E
- Elevation: 445 metres (1,460 ft)
- System: Indian Railways station
- Owner: Indian Railways
- Operator: West Central Railway
- Line: Agra–Bhopal section
- Platforms: 3
- Tracks: 3

Construction
- Structure type: Standard (on ground)
- Parking: No

Other information
- Status: Functioning
- Station code: DWG
- Zone(s): West Central Railway
- Division(s): Bhopal
Location
- Location within India Location within Madhya Pradesh

Dewanganj railway station is a railway station in Raisen district of Madhya Pradesh. Its code is DWG. The station consists of three platforms. Passenger trains halt here.
