= Chachaura Binaganj railway station =

Railway station in Chachaura, Madhya Pradesh, India

Chachaura Binaganj

General information
- Location: Chachaura, Guna district, Madhya Pradesh; India
- Coordinates: 24°10′38″N 77°00′59″E
- System: Indian Railways station
- Owner: Indian Railways
- Operator: West Central Railway
- Line: Indore–Gwalior line
- Platforms: 1
- Tracks: 1

Construction
- Structure type: Standard (on ground)
- Parking: Yes
- Cycle facilities: No

Other information
- Status: Functioning
- Station code: CBK
- Zone(s): West Central Railway
- Division(s): Bhopal
Location
- Location within India Location within Madhya Pradesh

Chachaura Binaganj railway station is a railway station in the city of Chachaura in Guna district, Madhya Pradesh. Its code is CBK. It serves Chachaura-Binaganj town. The station consists of one platform. It lacks many facilities including water and sanitation. Passenger, Express, and Superfast trains halt here.

== Trains ==
The following trains halt at Chachaura Binaganj railway station in both directions:

- Ratlam–Bhind Express
- Indore–Kota Intercity Express
- Ahmedabad–Varansi/Darbhanga Sabarmati Express
- Nagda-Bina Passenger
- Indore–Dehradun Express
- Jhansi–Bandra Terminus Express
