= Harsud railway station =

Railway station in Madhya Pradesh

Old Harsud railway station

General information
- Location: State Highway 15, Harsud, Madhya Pradesh; India
- Coordinates: 22.548°N 76.4359°E
- Elevation: 267 metres (876 ft)
- System: Indian Railways station
- Owner: Indian Railways
- Operator: Bhopal railway division
- Platforms: 2
- Tracks: 4
- Connections: Auto stand

Construction
- Structure type: Standard (on-ground station)
- Parking: No
- Cycle facilities: No

Other information
- Status: Old Harsud closed since Indirasagar Dam was made in 2004. Harsud in new location was opened in 2004.
- Station code: HRD
- Fare zone: West Central Railway

History
- Opened: 1870
- Closed: 2004
- Rebuilt: As Harsud railway station(station code HRD) in new location
- Electrified: Old Harsud was not electrified. Harsud is electrified
- Former names: Old Alignment of Howrah - Prayagraj(old name Allahabad) - Mumbai Main Railway Line.
Location

Harsud railway station is a railway station, situated at Harsud, Madhya Pradesh. Its station code is HRD. It serves Harsud city. The station consists of two platforms, neither well sheltered. It lacks many facilities including water and sanitation. Old station is presently defunct. Old Harsud station was submerged under the waters of the Indirasagar Dam in July 2004. Due to this the existing railway line between Itarsi Junction railway station(station code ET) & Khandwa Junction railway station(station code KNW) was abandoned & dismantled. A New 10 kilometres (6.2 mi) new line was laid & Harsud railway station(HRD) was shifted to new location increasing the distance by 14 kilometres (8.7 mi). Current distance between Itarsi Junction railway station(station code ET) & Khandwa Junction railway station(station code KNW) is 183 kilometres (114 mi), which was 169 kilometres (105 mi) before construction of Indirasagar Dam Reservoir in July 2004. The old railway line still exist from Talvadiya Junction railway station(station code TLV) to Singaji railway station(station code SJ) connecting Indirasagar Dam Thermal Power Station.

== See also ==
- Indirasagar Dam
- Harsud
- List of railway stations in India
- Itarsi
- Khandwa
