= Khirkiya railway station =

Railway station in Madhya Pradesh, India

Khirkiya

General information
- Location: Khirkiya, Harda district, Madhya Pradesh; India
- Coordinates: 22°09′57″N 76°51′32″E
- System: Indian Railways station
- Owner: Indian Railways
- Operator: West Central Railway
- Line: Jabalpur–Bhusaval section
- Platforms: 2
- Tracks: 2

Construction
- Structure type: Standard (on ground)
- Parking: Yes

Other information
- Status: Functioning
- Station code: KKN
- Zone(s): West Central Railway
- Division(s): Bhopal
Location
- Location within India Location within Madhya Pradesh

Khirkiya railway station is a railway station in Harda district, Madhya Pradesh. Its code is KKN. It serves Khirkiya town. The station consists of two platforms. It lacks many facilities including water and sanitation. Passenger and Express trains halt here.
