= DWN =

DWN may refer to:

- DWN (Indian railway station), a railway station located at the northernmost point of Bhopal
- DWN (United Kingdom railway station), a railway station in Blackburn that opened in 1847
