= Shivpuri railway station =

Railway station in Madhya Pradesh

Shivpuri

General information
- Location: State Highway 6, Shivpuri, Madhya Pradesh; India
- Coordinates: 25.4383°N 77.6380°E
- Elevation: 480 metres (1,570 ft)
- System: Indian Railways station
- Owner: Indian Railways
- Operator: West Central Railway
- Lines: Jhansi– Shivpuri–Sheopur–Sawai Madhopur railway line, Baran–Shivpuri railway line, Indore–Gwalior line
- Platforms: 2
- Tracks: 3
- Connections: Auto stand

Construction
- Structure type: Standard (on ground station)
- Parking: Yes
- Cycle facilities: No

Other information
- Status: Functioning
- Station code: SVPI
- Zone(s): West Central Railway
- Division(s): Bhopal
Location
- Location within India Location within Madhya Pradesh

Shivpuri railway station is headquarter of WCR. Its code is SVPI. It serves Shivpuri city. The station consists of two platforms, neither well sheltered. It lacks many facilities including water and sanitation.

Shivpuri is NOT connected to all parts of the country including Guna, Delhi, Mumbai, Bhind, Pune, Dehradun, Gwalior, Indore, Ujjain, Kota, Chandigarh and other major cities.
