= National Fertilizers =

Indian central public sector undertaking

National Fertilizers Limited
- Type: Public
- Traded as: BSE: 523630; NSE: NFL
- Industry: Agrochemical
- Founded: 23 August 1974
- Headquarters: Noida, Uttar Pradesh, India
- Key people: U Saravanan (Chairman & MD)
- Products: Urea; Ammonia; Organic fertilisers industrial chemicals
- Revenue: ▲₹29,809.14 crore (US$3.1 billion) (2022-23)
- Operating income: ▲₹779.73 crore (US$81 million) (2019)
- Net income: ▲₹298.45 crore (US$31 million) (2019)
- Total assets: ▲₹13,912.15 crore (US$1.4 billion) (2019)
- Total equity: ▲₹2,219.02 crore (US$230 million) (2019)
- Owner: Government of India (74.71%)
- Number of employees: 3,333 (March 2019)
- Website: www.nationalfertilizers.com

National Fertilizers Limited (NFL) is an Indian central public sector undertaking and the largest government-owned-Urea fertilizer-producer in India. It is a Navratna company, with the Government of India owning a majority stake.

Incorporated in 1974, NFL comes under the administrative control of the Ministry of Chemicals and Fertilizers, and is the second largest producer of the key fertiliser urea in India. NFL has five gas-based ammonia-urea plants viz Nangal and Bathinda in Punjab, Panipat in Haryana and two at Vijaipur (Madhya Pradesh).

== History ==
NFL was established in 23 August 1974, as a public-sector undertaking of the Government of India.

NFL initially operated two plants in Bathinda and Panipat. In 1978, the ownership and operations of the Nangal plant of FCI was transferred to NFL.

The Govt. of India, in 1984, entrusted the company to execute the country's first inland gas based fertilizer project of 726,000 tones urea capacity in District Guna of Madhya Pradesh, and commercial production started from 1 July 1988. The company built and commissioned its Vijaipur plant in Guna district of Madhya capacity was doubled to 1.45 million tones in 1997.

In 2024, NFL was granted the Navratna status with additional autonomy due to its profitable operations.

In 2001, the company went public, with listings on the Bombay Stock Exchange and the National Stock Exchange.

=== Industrial and business operations ===
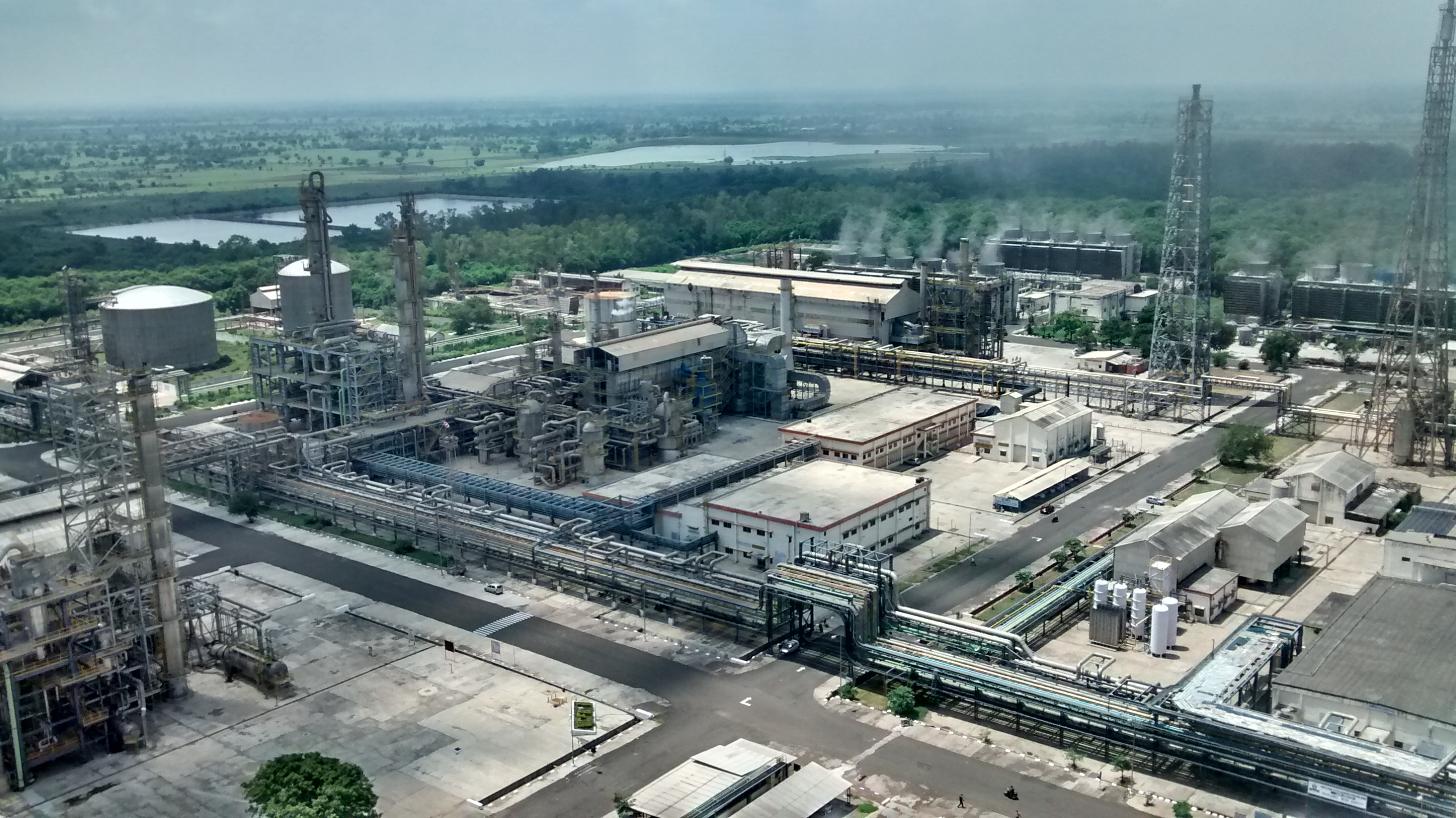
Vijapur Unit 2 as seen from prilling tower

NFL has five gas-based urea plants viz Nangal and Bathinda in Punjab, Panipat in Haryana and two at Vijaipur (Madhya Pradesh). The plants at Panipat, Bathinda and Nangal have recently been converted from fuel oil feedstock to natural gas. Vijaipur plants have also been revamped for energy saving and capacity enhancement.

=== Products ===
NFL is engaged in manufacturing and marketing of urea, Neem-coated urea, bio-fertilizers (solid and liquid) and other allied industrial products like ammonia, nitric acid, ammonium nitrate, sodium nitrite, sodium nitrate etc.

The value-added Neem-coated urea developed by NFL and widely recognized for its effectiveness is being produced at its three units at Panipat, Bathinda and Vijaipur. NFL is the first company in India to be permitted by the Government of India to produce and market Neem-coated urea.

NFL manufactures and markets three types of Bio-Fertilizers namely Rhizobium, Phosphate Solubilizing Bacteria (PSB) and Azotobacter. Starting with a mere 23 MT production in 1995–96, the production has risen to 231 MT (Approx.) in 2010–11.

=== Business ===
The company is also doing trading business in various agro-inputs like certified quality seeds, compost / Vermicompost manure, agrochemicals like Insecticides / Herbicides, Bentonite Sulphur etc. Company is also taking up initiative for setting up of Single Super Phosphate (SSP), Heavy water, Bentonite Sulphur plants etc.

=== Marketing ===
The company's marketing network comprises central marketing office at NOIDA (UP), Four zonal offices at Bhopal, Lucknow and Chandigarh and Hyderabad, 14 state offices and 39 area offices spread across the country.

=== Future projects ===
An agreement for a joint venture company "Ramagundam Fertilizers And Chemicals Limited" has been signed on 14 January 2015 between National Fertilizers Limited, Engineers India Limited (EIL) and FCIL for setting up new ammonia and urea plants of 2200 MT per day and 3850 MT per day capacity respectively at the existing site of Ramagundam Fertilizer Plant in District. Ramagundam in Telangana. As per this joint venture agreement, NFL shall provide commissioning, operation, maintenance and marketing services to the joint venture company and EIL shall provide Engineering, Procurement and Construction Management (EPCM) Consultancy Services for the project. The total capital expenditure of 50 billion is being funded in Debt: Equity of 70:30 percentage. NFL and EIL are contributing equity of 26% each and 11% is from FCIL. The balance equity is in the process of being tied up. The company also has a joint venture (33.33% share) “Urvarak Videsh Limited” with M/s. KRIBHCO and RCF as promoters. The main objective of the joint venture company is to explore investment opportunity abroad and within the country in nitrogenous, phosphatic and potassic sectors and to render consultancy services for setting up projects in India and abroad.

==== Consultancy ====
NFL is well known for taking up assignments in India and abroad in the fields of:

1. commissioning activities of plant/ equipment
2. heavy equipment erection supervision
3. complete operation of chemical plants on a continuous basis
4. overall maintenance of plants; specialized maintenance and repair services/shutdown/turn around jobs
5. special maintenance and repair services for rotatory equipment, like pumps, compressors, turbines etc.
6. energy audits leading to energy savings safety audit services
7. design and monitoring of environment protection systems
8. NDT, corrosion and RLA services
9. laboratory services
10. training of technical manpower in operation maintenance and safety management
11. consultancy in project management

== Performance ==
=== Production ===
The percentage share of NFL in urea production in the country was 14.2% during 2012–13. The company produced 3211,000 tones of urea, which includes 10.83 LMT of Neem-coated urea. 448 MT of bio-fertilizers (solid and liquid) was produced during the year.

=== Sales and marketing ===
During 2012–13, company sold 31.62 LMT of urea (including 10.92 LMT of Neem-coated urea). Industrial products of worth ` 956.3 million and Bio-Fertilizers (liquid and solid) of` 36.5 million were sold during 2012–13. Turnover of traded Agri products (compost, seeds, Bentonite sulphur and pesticides) was ` 300.8 million.

=== Financial ===
The company, during 2012–13, achieved a sales turnover of ` 67.47 billion (previous year ` 73.41 billion). The lower turnover was primarily due to lower urea production as all the units were under shutdown for hooking up and commissioning activities of the projects. The loss before tax was ` 2306.2 million (previous year profit `1842.0 million) and loss after tax was ` 1707.3 million (previous year profit `1267.3 million).
