= Shajapur railway station =

Railway station in Madhya Pradesh, India

Shajapur
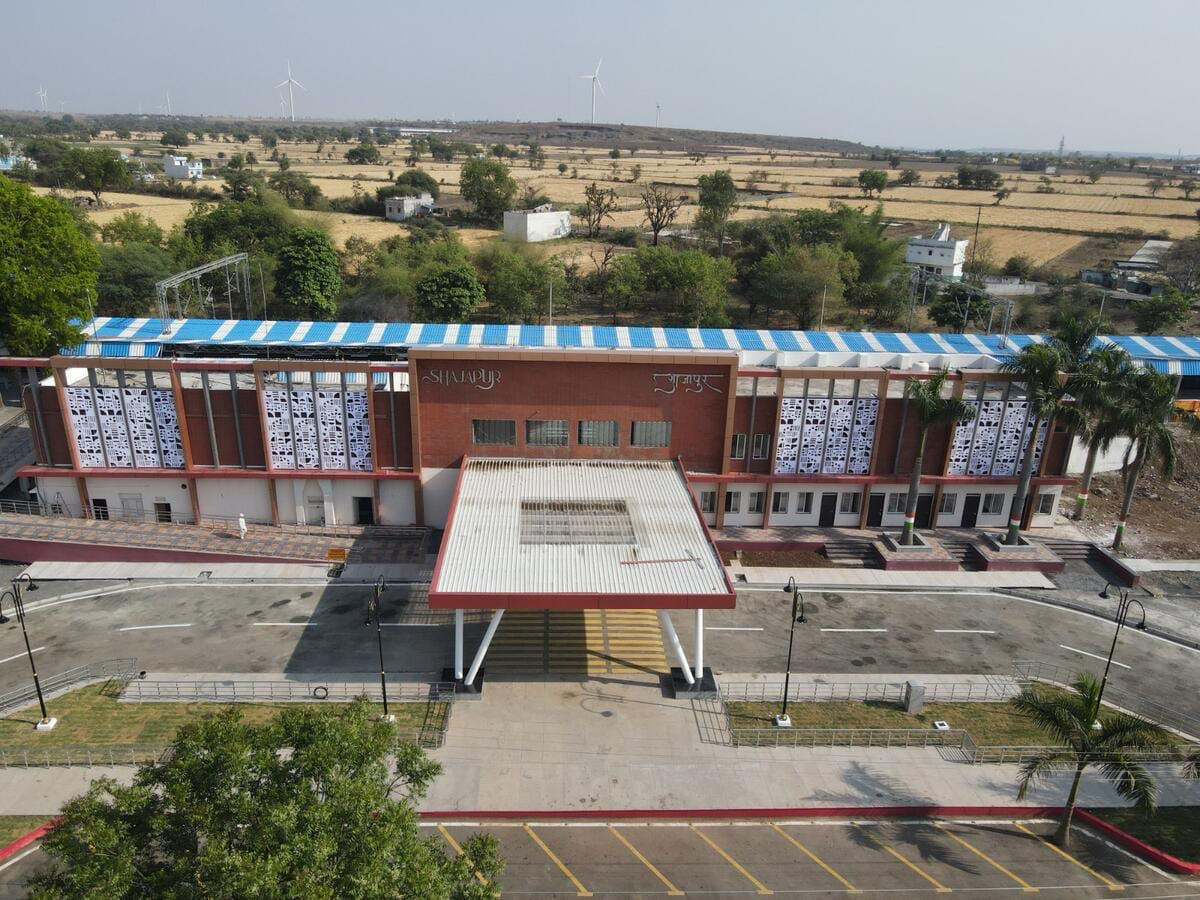
- Shajapur Railway Station

General information
- Location: Station Road, Shajapur, Madhya Pradesh; India
- Coordinates: 23.4252°N 76.2979°E
- Elevation: 453 metres (1,486 ft)
- System: Indian Railways station
- Owner: Ministry of Railways (India)
- Operator: West Central Railway
- Line: Indore–Gwalior line
- Platforms: 2
- Tracks: 4
- Connections: Auto stand

Construction
- Structure type: Standard (on-ground station)
- Parking: Yes
- Accessible: Available

Other information
- Status: Functioning
- Station code: SFY
- Zone(s): West Central Railway
- Division(s): Bhopal

History
- Opened: 1960; 66 years ago
Location
- Location within Madhya Pradesh Location within India

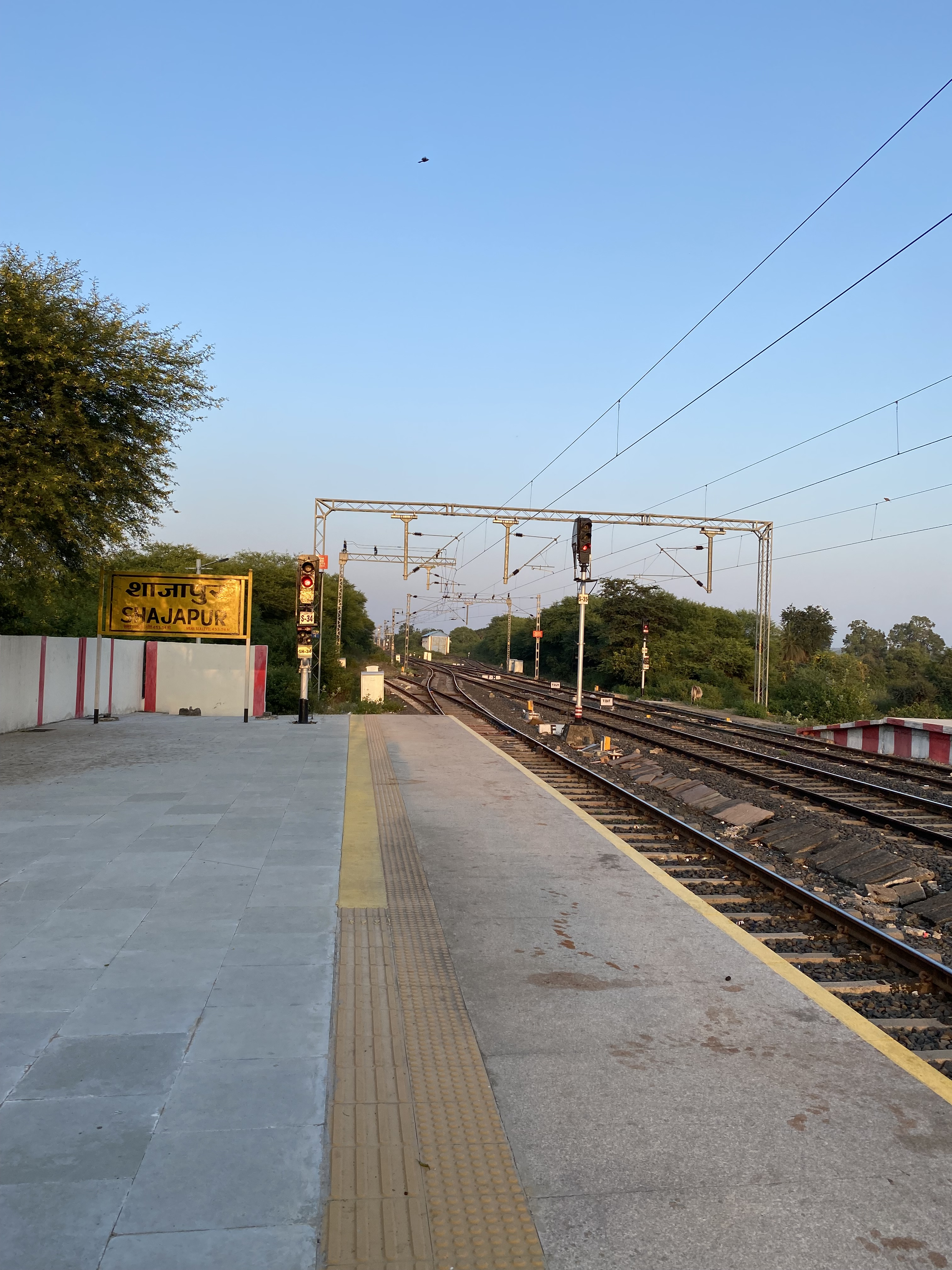
Shajapur Platform

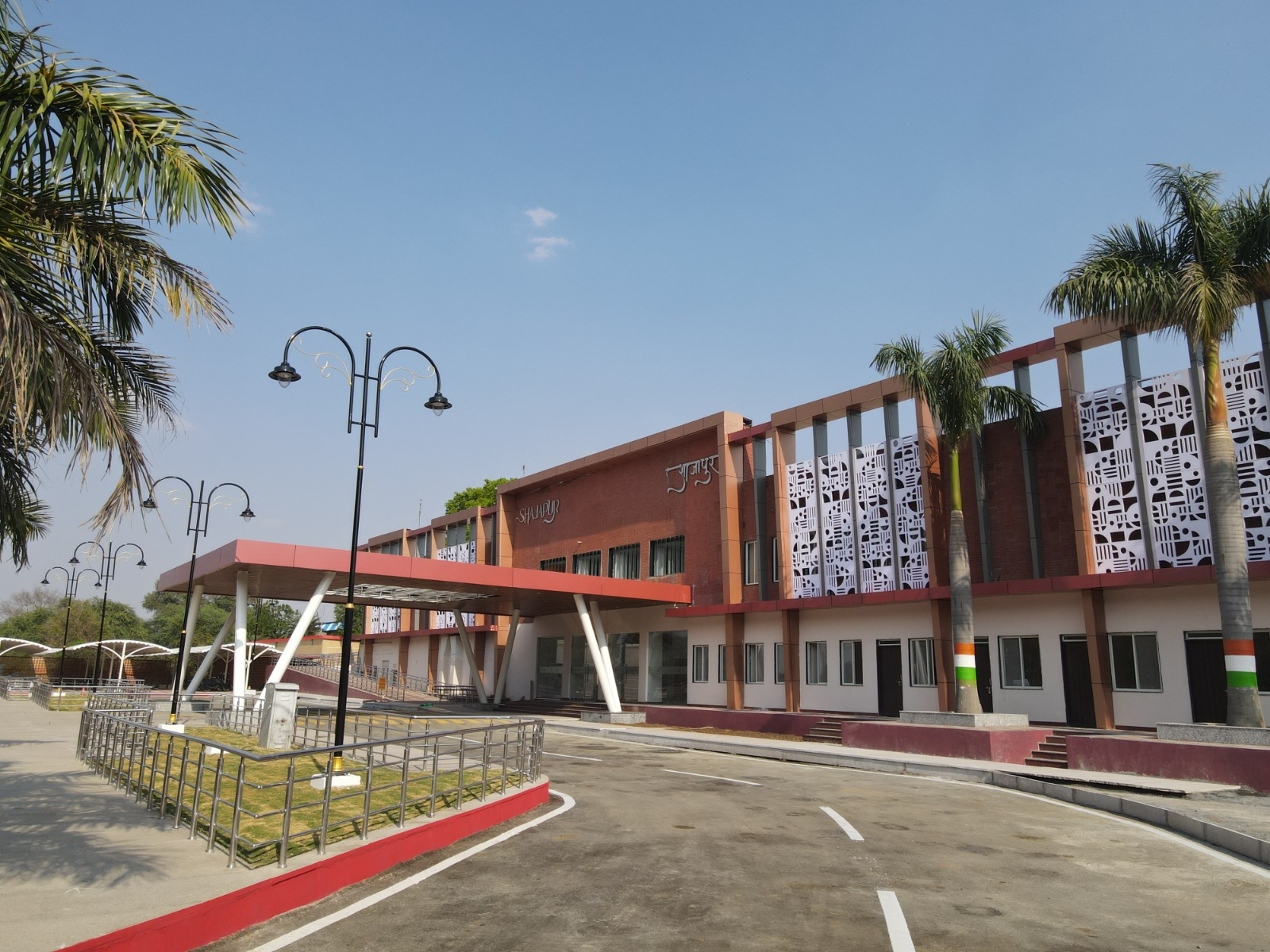
Shajapur station

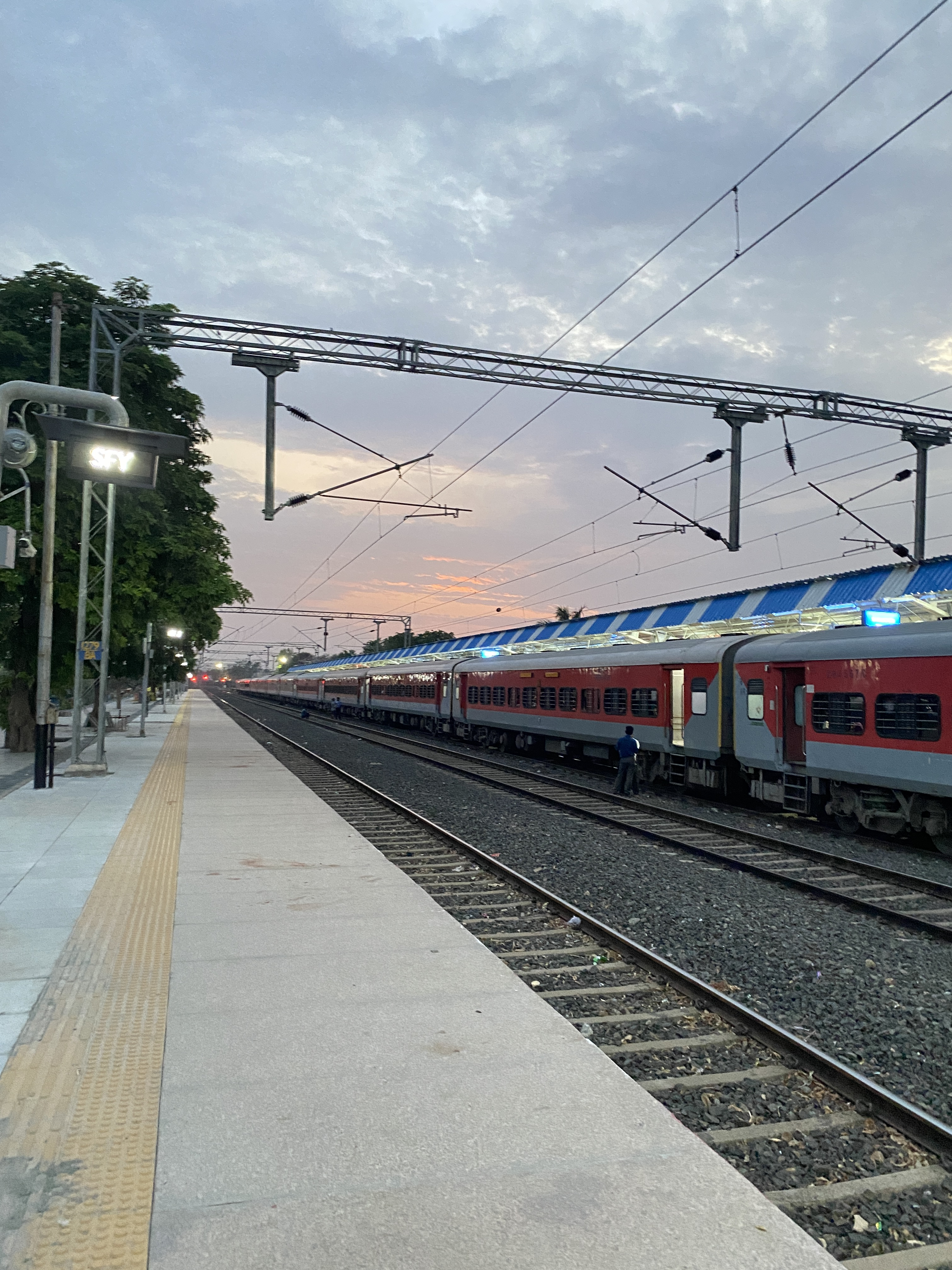
Shajapur evening

Shajapur railway station is a railway station in situated on Indore–Gwalior line in Shajapur district, Madhya Pradesh. Its code is SFY. It serves Shajapur City. The station consists of two platforms, Coach Display, Waiting Room, Footover Bridge, Food stall, Reservation Counter and UTS machine. West Central Railway Most cleanest Station are Shajapur.
