= Pawarkheda =

- Village
- Location within Madhya Pradesh Location within India
- Coordinates: 22°40′50.01″N 77°44′59.18″E
- Country: India
- State: Madhya Pradesh
- District: Narmadapuram district
- Taluk: Narmadapuram

Languages
  - Official: Hindi
- Time zone: UTC+5:30 (IST)
- PIN: 461110
- Telephone code: 07574
- ISO 3166 code: IN-MP
- Vehicle registration: MP-05

Pawarkheda is a village in the Narmadapuram tehsil of Narmadapuram district in the Indian state of Madhya Pradesh. It is 9 km from Itarsi, the major rail junction in India.

== Demographics ==
As of 2001 India census, Pawarkheda had a population of 1,028 with 559 males and 469 females and 166 Households.

== Multi-modal composite logistics hub ==
Madhya Pradesh State Agricultural Marketing Board in association with Madhya Pradesh Warehousing and Logistics Corporation intends to set up Composite Logistics Hub. The project land is at Itarsi in an area of approximately 115 acres of land between National Highway No. 69 and Delhi-Mumbai Railway line next to Pawarkheda Railway Station.

== See also ==
- Itarsi
- Bhopal
- Narmadapuram
- Madhya Pradesh
