= Hoshangabad railway station =

Railway station in Madhya Pradesh

Hoshangabad railway station Narmadapuram railway station

General information
- Location: Hoshangabad, Madhya Pradesh; India
- Coordinates: 22.7527°N 77.7173°E
- Elevation: 309 metres (1,014 ft)
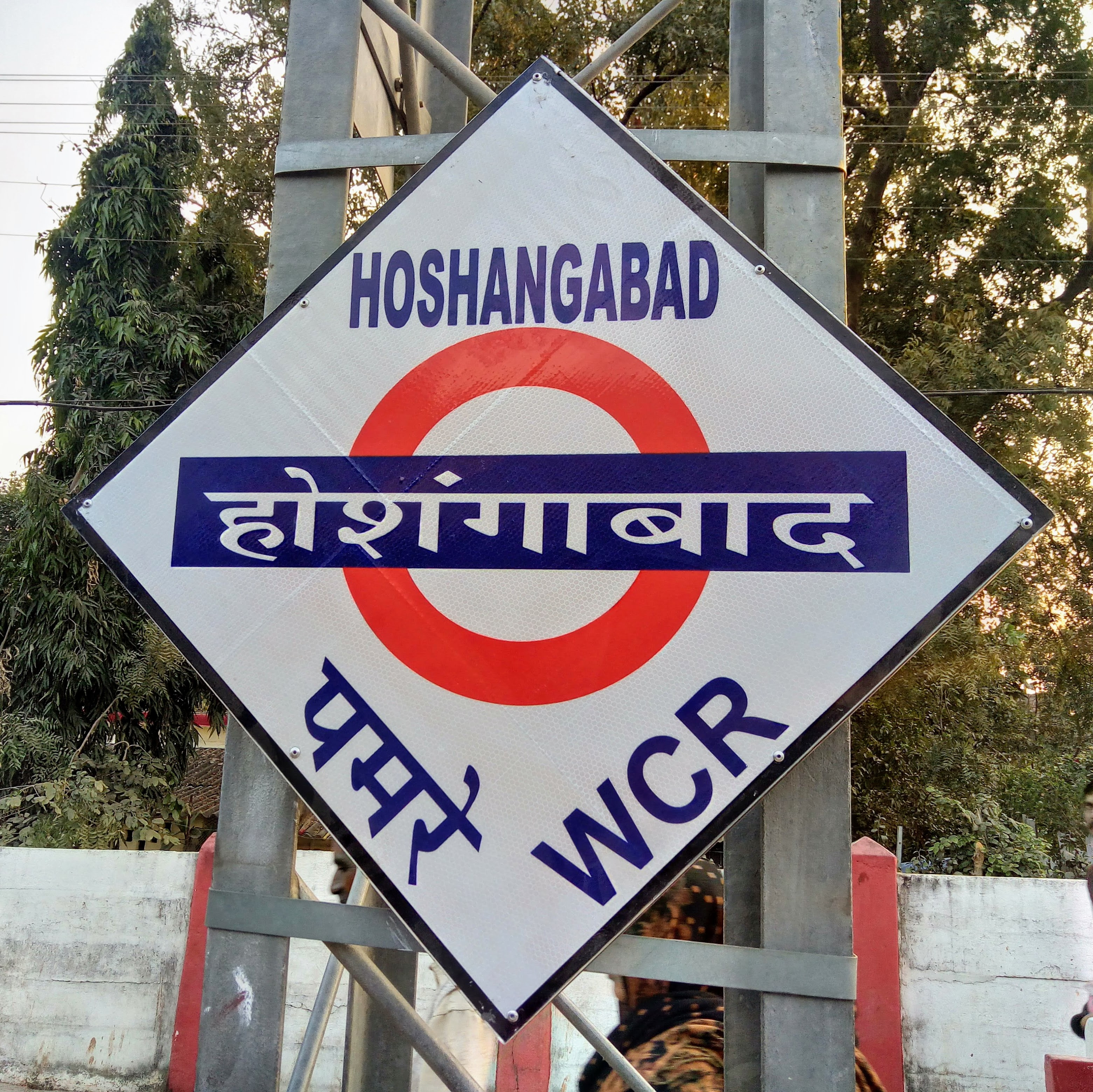
- System: Hoshnagabad Station Bord Indian Railway station
- Owner: Indian Railways
- Operator: West Central Railway
- Line: Bhopal–Nagpur section
- Platforms: 2
- Tracks: 2
- Connections: Auto stand

Construction
- Structure type: Standard (on-ground station)
- Parking: Yes
- Cycle facilities: No

Other information
- Status: Functioning
- Station code: NDPM
- Zone(s): West Central Railway
- Division(s): Bhopal
Location
- Location within India Location within Madhya Pradesh

Hoshangabad railway station, officially Narmadapuram railway station, is a railway station serving the city of Hoshangabad in Madhya Pradesh, India. It is under Bhopal railway division of West Central Railway zone of Indian Railways, located on the New Delhi–Chennai main line.

It is located at 309 m above sea level and has two platforms. As of 2016, an electrified double 5 ft 6 in (1,676 mm) line exists and at this station, 66 trains stop. Raja Bhoj Airport is at distance of 75 kilometres.
