= Ruthiyai Junction railway station =

Railway station in Madhya Pradesh, India

Ruthiyai Junction

General information
- Location: Ruthiyai, Guna district, Madhya Pradesh; India
- Coordinates: 24°32′05″N 77°10′47″E
- System: Indian Railways station
- Owner: Indian Railways
- Operator: West Central Railway
- Line: Indore–Gwalior line
- Platforms: 3
- Tracks: 5

Construction
- Structure type: Standard (on ground)
- Parking: Yes
- Cycle facilities: No

Other information
- Status: Functioning
- Station code: RTA
- Zone(s): West Central Railway
- Division(s): Bhopal
Location
- Interactive map

Ruthiyai Junction railway station is an important railway station in Guna district, Madhya Pradesh. Its code is RTA. It serves Ruthiyai village. The station consists of two platforms. It lacks many facilities including water and sanitation. All Passenger, Express and Superfast trains halt here. Many Freight trains also pass through this station.
