= Sanchi, Madhya Pradesh =

Sanchi Town
- Nagar panchayat
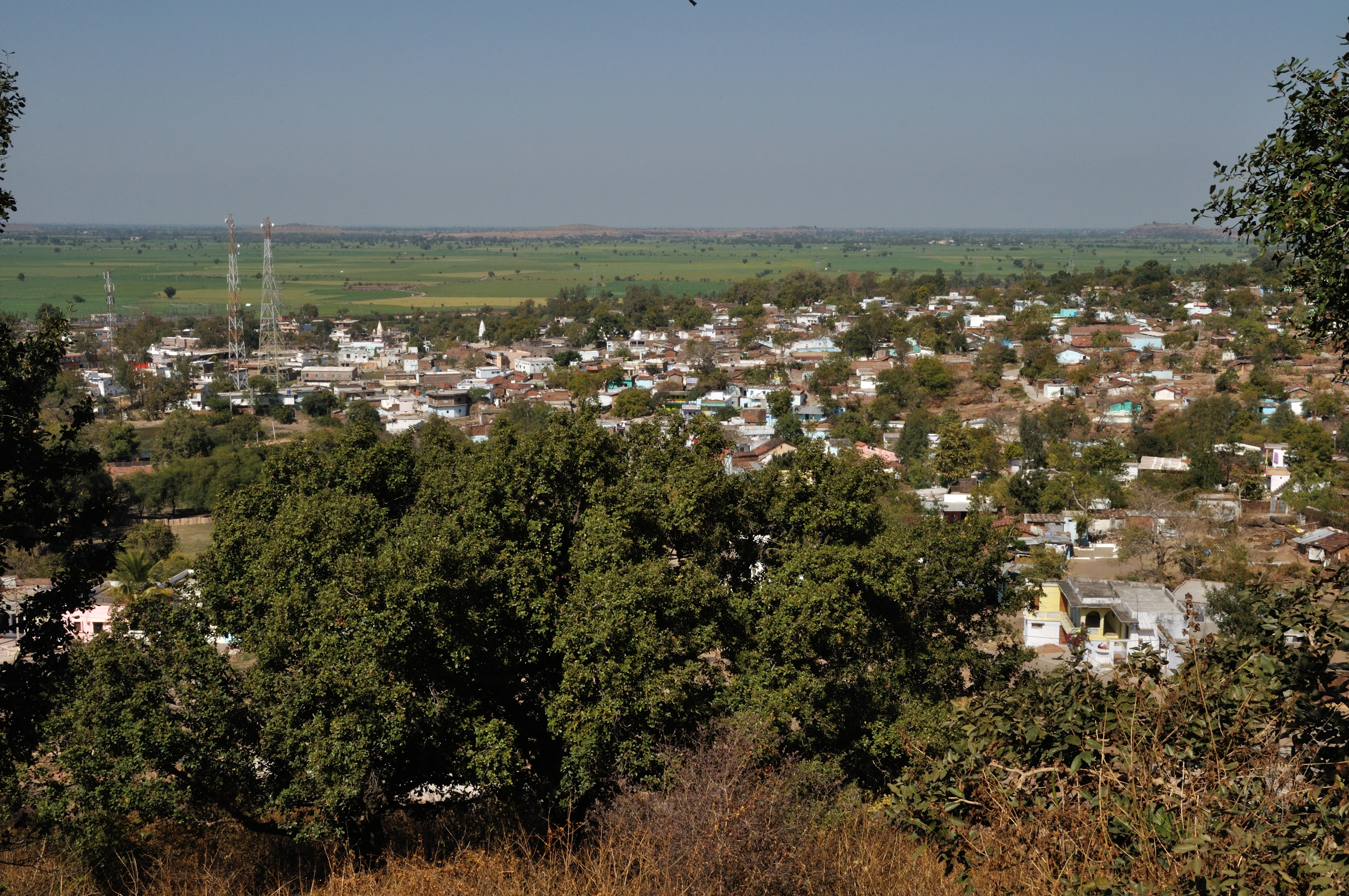
- Sanchi town from the Sanchi hill, MP

- Location within Madhya Pradesh
- Coordinates: 23.480656°N 77.736300°E
- Country: India
- State: Madhya Pradesh
- District: Raisen

Population (2001)
  - Total: 6,785

Languages
  - Official: Hindi
- Time zone: UTC+5:30 (IST)

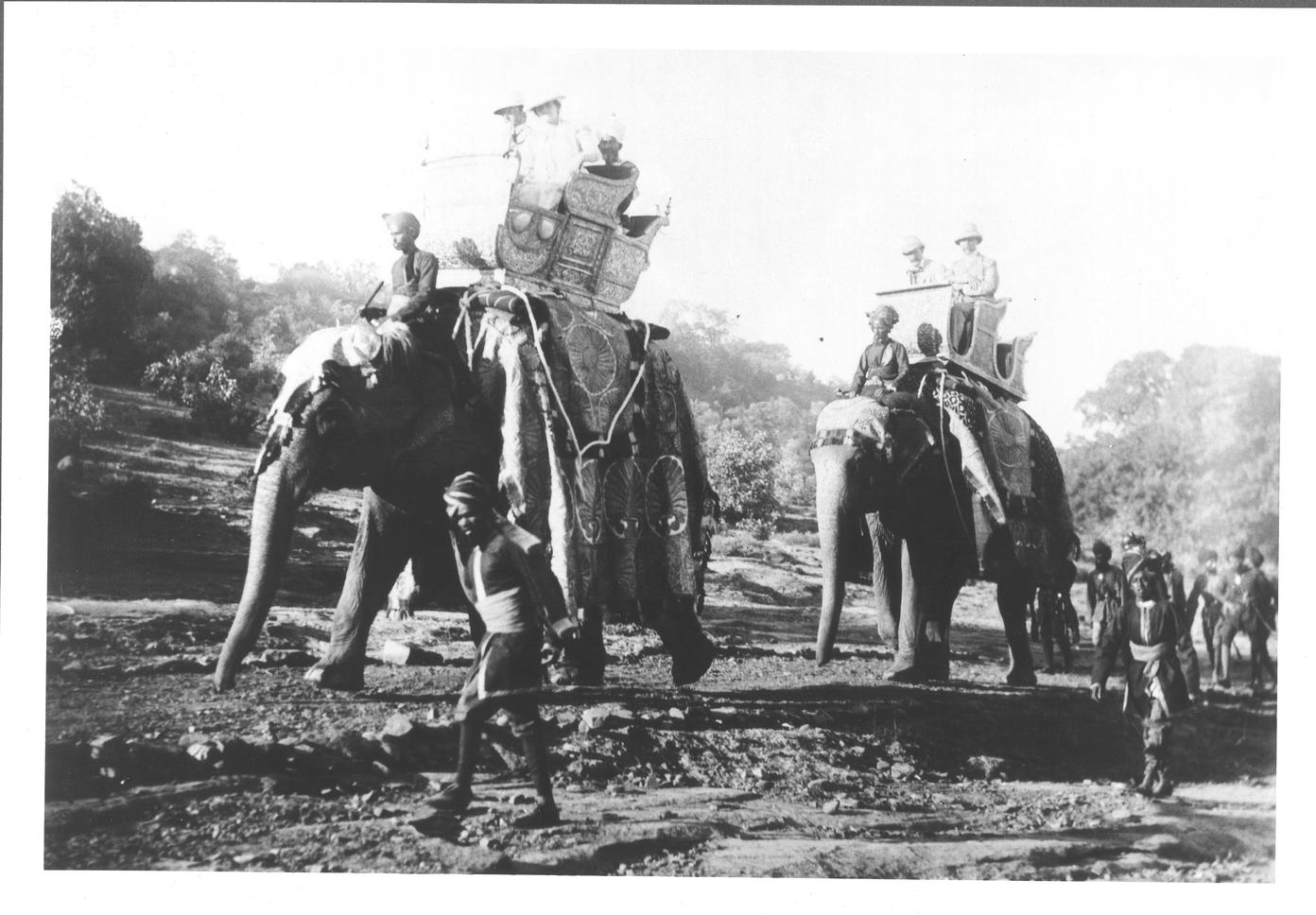
Elephant procession to Sanchi Tope in Sanchi, Madhya Pradesh

Sanchi Town is a Nagar panchayat, near Raisen town in Raisen District of the state of Madhya Pradesh, India, it is located 46 km (29 mi) north east of Bhopal, and 10 km (6.2 mi) from Besnagar or Vidisha in the central part of the state of Madhya Pradesh. Known for its "Sanchi Stupas", it is the location of several Buddhist monuments dating from the 3rd century BC to the 12th CE and is one of the important places of Buddhist pilgrimage.

== Etymology of Sanchi ==
In Mahavamsa the site is referred to as Chetiyagiri, which was visited by Mahinda and his mother Devi. Early votive inscription refer to the place as Kakanaya. In the Gupta period it was termed Kakanada-Bota, and Bots-Shri-Parvat in the 7th century. A small hilltop village, just besides the stupa complex, is still called Kanakheda.

The name Sanchi might have originated from Sanskrit and Pali word sanch meaning "to measure". In Hindi, however Sanchi or Sancha means "Moulds of Stones".

== Demographics ==
As of 2001 India census, Sanchi had a population of 6,785. Males constitute 53% of the population and females 47%. Sanchi has an average literacy rate of 67%, higher than the national average of 59.5%: male literacy is 75%, and to female literacy is 57%. In Sanchi, 16% of the population is under 6 years of age.

== Monuments at Sanchi ==
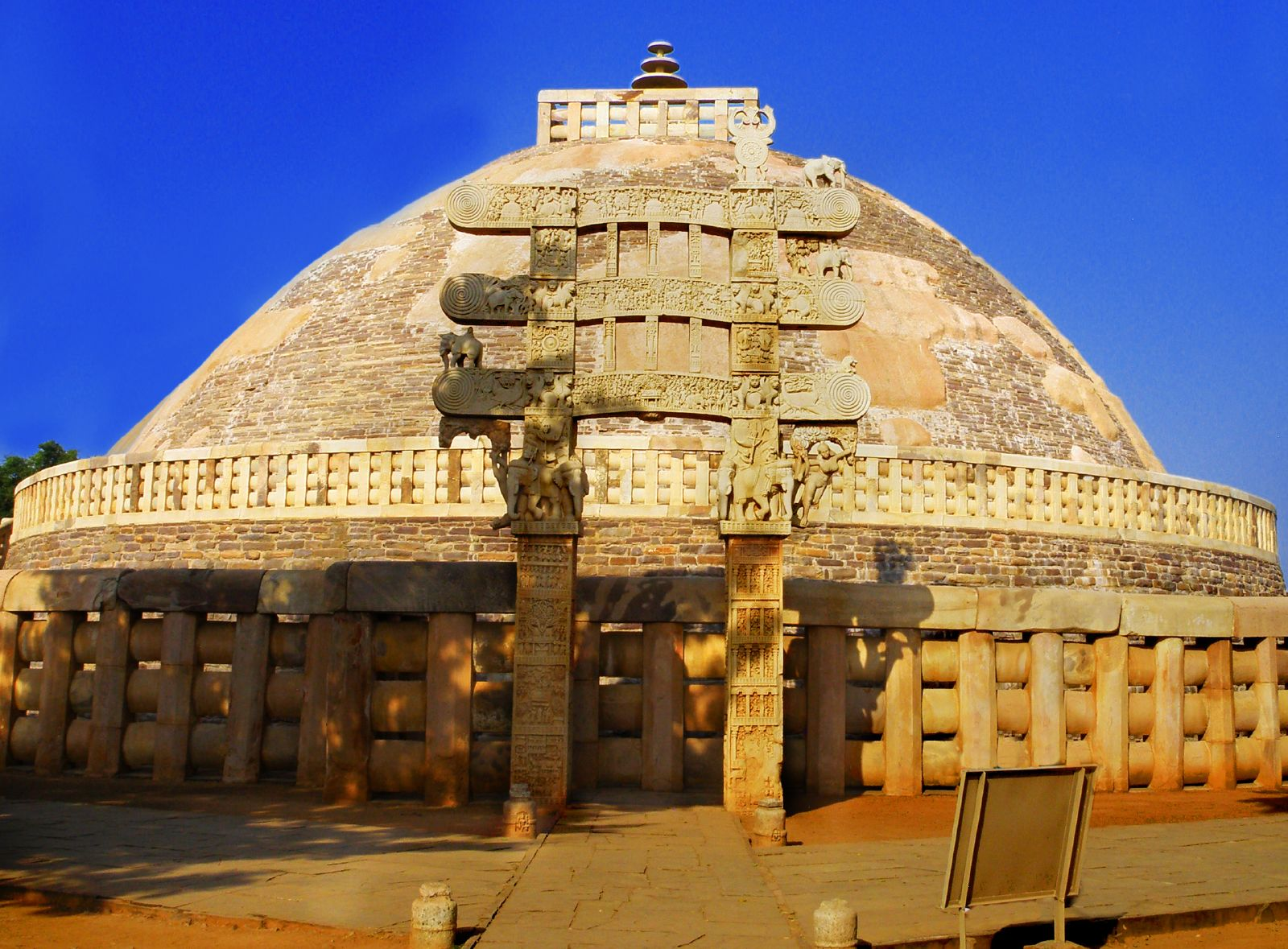
The Great Sanchi Stupa

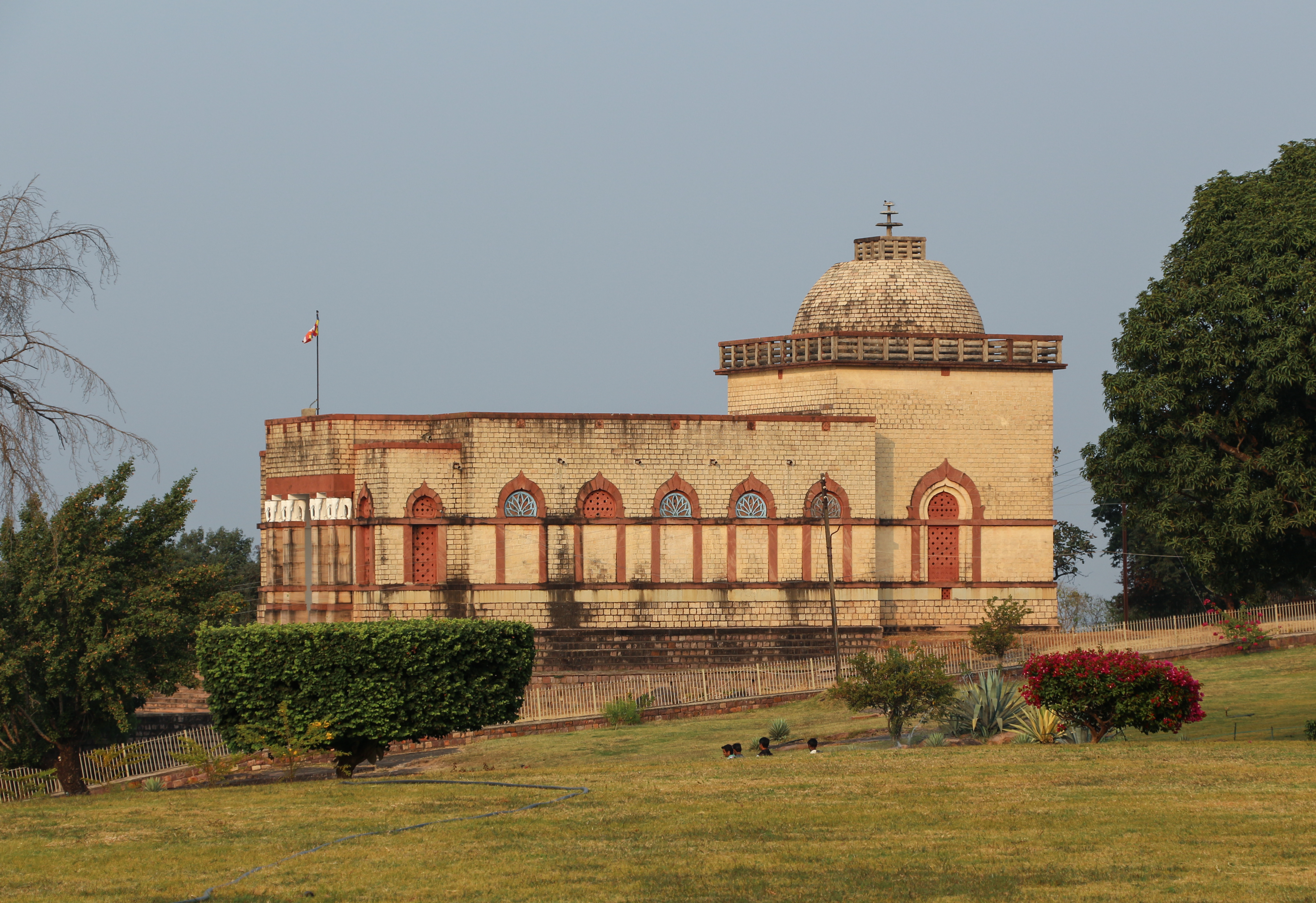
Chetiyagiri Vihara

There are numerous monuments at Sanchi. The main are these, using the numbers assigned by Sir Alexander Cunningham, founder of the Archaeological Survey of India, who led excavations at Sanchi in 1854, which are still often used in the literature:

- The main terrace: Stupa 1 (Great Stupa), Stupa 3, Pillar 10 (Ashoka Pillar), Temple 18 (Mauryan apsidal), Temple 17 (Gupta).
- Eastern Area: Temple 45 (10th century CE).
- Southern Area: Temple 40
- The western slope: Monastery 51 and Stupa
- The Archaeological Museum

== Nearby Buddhist sites ==
Sanchi is one of a number of Buddhist sites in close vicinity of Vidisha. Other Buddhist complexes nearby are;

- Sonari
- Satdhara (the remains of Sariputta and Moglayan from here are now in Sanchi)
- Bhojpur
- Andher

All the sites are south of Vidisha. Some other Buddhist sites have been recently studied.

== Buddhist University ==
On 11 September 2012, the Government of Madhya Pradesh announced the Sanchi University of Buddhist-Indic Studies, which is being built in collaboration with the government of Sri Lanka and Bhutan and will be located at Sanchi, in close proximity to the stupa. Designed by Sri Lankan architect SW Isurunath Bulankulame, the university will have various facilities, combined with a green landscape and usage of natural energy.

The foundation stone for the university was laid on 17 September 2012 by Sri Lankan president Mahinda Rajapaksa, Bhutan's Prime Minister Jigmi Yozyer Thinley, and Mahabodhi Society of Sri Lanka president Bangala Upatissa Nayaka Thero, amid high security due to a massive protest being organised by MDMK leader Vaiko against Rajapaksa, who had specially arrived in Madhya Pradesh with many protesters, but ultimately stopped.

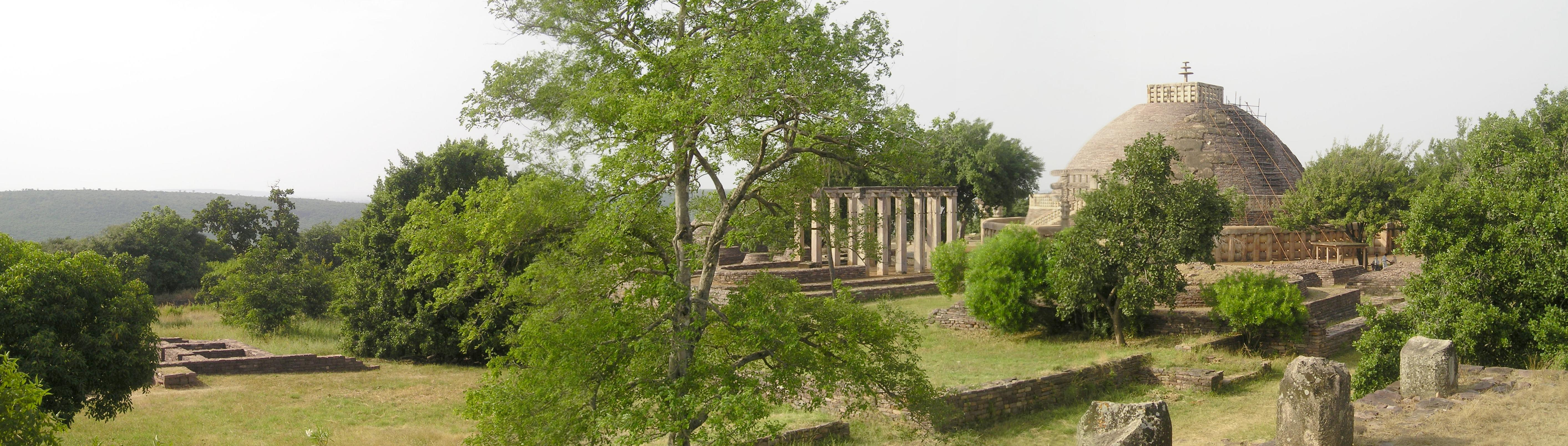
Panoramic view of Sanchi: Monastery 36, Temple 18, Stupa 1, shelter with fragments of Pillar 10

== Solar city ==
On September 6, 2023, Sanchi, home to a World Heritage Site in Madhya Pradesh, was inaugurated as India’s first solar city. The project, which involves the installation of rooftop solar panels at all institutional buildings like schools, government offices, railway stations, post offices, and streetlights, has been claimed to reduce more than 14,000 tonnes of carbon dioxide emissions annually, which is equivalent to the amount of CO₂ reduced by over 2 lakh adult trees.
