= Agra–Bhopal section =

Railway section in India

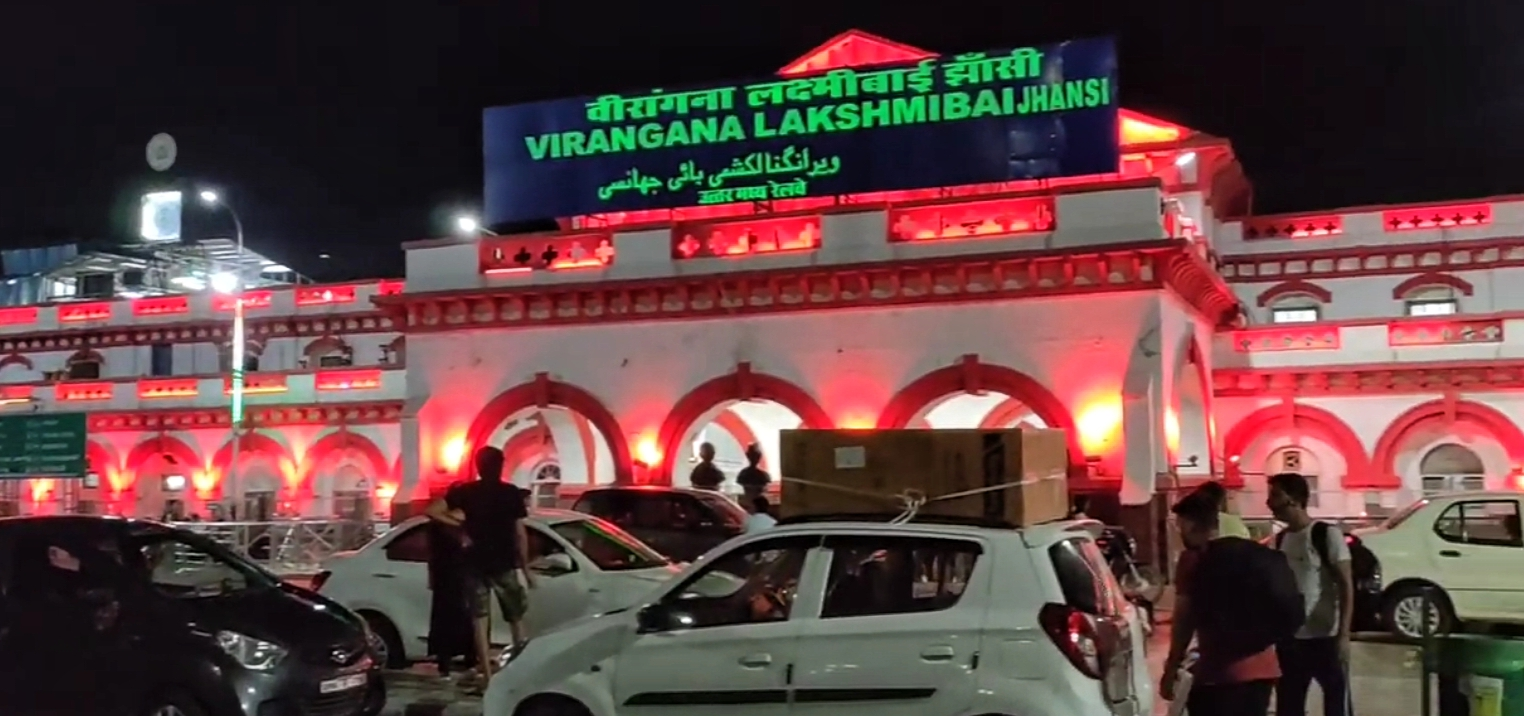
- Jhansi junction is an important railway station on Agra–Bhopal section

Overview
- Status: Operational
- Owner: Indian Railways
- Termini: Agra; Bhopal

Service
- Operator(s): North Central Railway; West Central Railway
- Depot(s): Jhansi, Gwalior, Dhaulpur
- Rolling stock: WDM-2, WDM-3A, WDM-3D, WDG-3A, WDS-6, WDG-4, WAG-5HA / WAG5HB, WAG-7, NDM-5, ZDM-3, WDS-4, WDM-2S, WAP-4, WAP-5, WAP-7, WAG-9

History
- Opened: 1889

Technical
- Track length: Mainline: 508 km (316 mi); Branch lines: Gwalior–Bhind 82 km (51 mi); Gwalior–Sheopur Kalan NG 199 km (124 mi); Jhansi–Kanpur 220 km (137 mi)
- Num of tracks: 2 Tracks Between Agra to Bina; 3 Tracks Between Bina to Bhopal
- Track gauge: 5 ft 6 in (1,676 mm) broad gauge
- Electrification: 1984–89
- Operating speed: up to 160 km/h

The Agra–Bhopal section is a 508 km (316 mi) railway line connecting Agra in Uttar Pradesh with Bhopal, the capital of Madhya Pradesh. It forms part of the New Delhi–Chennai main line and is jointly operated by the North Central Railway and West Central Railway zones of Indian Railways.

== History ==
The Agra–Gwalior line was opened by the Maharaja of Gwalior in 1881 and it became the Scindia State Railway. The Indian Midland Railway built the Gwalior–Jhansi line and the Jhansi–Bhopal line in 1889. The Agra–Gwalior–Jhansi–Bhopal line became part of the Delhi–Chennai line in 1929.

The Jhansi–Kanpur line was constructed by the Indian Midland Railway in 1889.

The Gwalior–Bhind line was opened as a 610 mm (2 ft)-wide narrow-gauge line in 1899. It was converted to broad gauge in 2001.

The Gwalior–Sheopur Kalan 610 mm (2 ft)-wide narrow-gauge line was constructed between 1904 and 1909.

== Electrification ==
The Agra–Gwalior sector was electrified in 1984–85, the Gwalior–Babina sector in 1986–87, Babina–Bareth sector in 1987–88, and Bareth-Bhopal sector in 1988–89. The Jhansi–Kanpur branch line was recently electrified in 2013 and has become operational with electric locomotives.

== Speed limits ==
The Delhi–Chennai Central line (Grand Trunk route) is classified as a "Group A" line which can take speeds up to 160 km/h. For the BG branch lines speed limit is generally 100 km/h.

Bhopal Shatabdi Express, the fastest train in India, powered by a WAP-5 loco, travels along this line. The Chennai Rajdhani Express, which runs at an average speed (including halts) of 77.23 km/h. uses this line.

== Passenger movement ==
Agra Cantt., Gwalior, Jhansi and Bhopal are amongst the top hundred booking stations of Indian Railway.

== Loco sheds ==
Jhansi diesel loco shed holds 125+ locos including WDM-2, WDM-3A, WDM-3D, WDG-3A, WDS-6, WDG-4. Jhansi electric loco shed holds 180+ locos including WAG-5HA / WAG5HB, WAG-7. Gwalior NG diesel loco shed houses NDM-5 locos and carries out periodic overhaul. Dhaulpur NG diesel loco shed holds ZDM-3 locomotives used for Dhaulpur – Tantpur / Sirmuttra section. Agra diesel loco shop houses WDS-4, WDM-2S locos. The shed caters to the loco requirement for shunting at major NCR stations and the Jhansi Workshop.

== Workshops ==
Jhansi has the largest workshop in Indian Railways for periodic overhaul of freight wagons. Broad gauge coach Workshop at Bhopal handles rebuilding and overhaul of old passenger coaches. Gwalior Coaching Workshop handles narrow-gauge coaches.
