= Bhopal railway division =

Railway division of India

Bhopal Railway Division
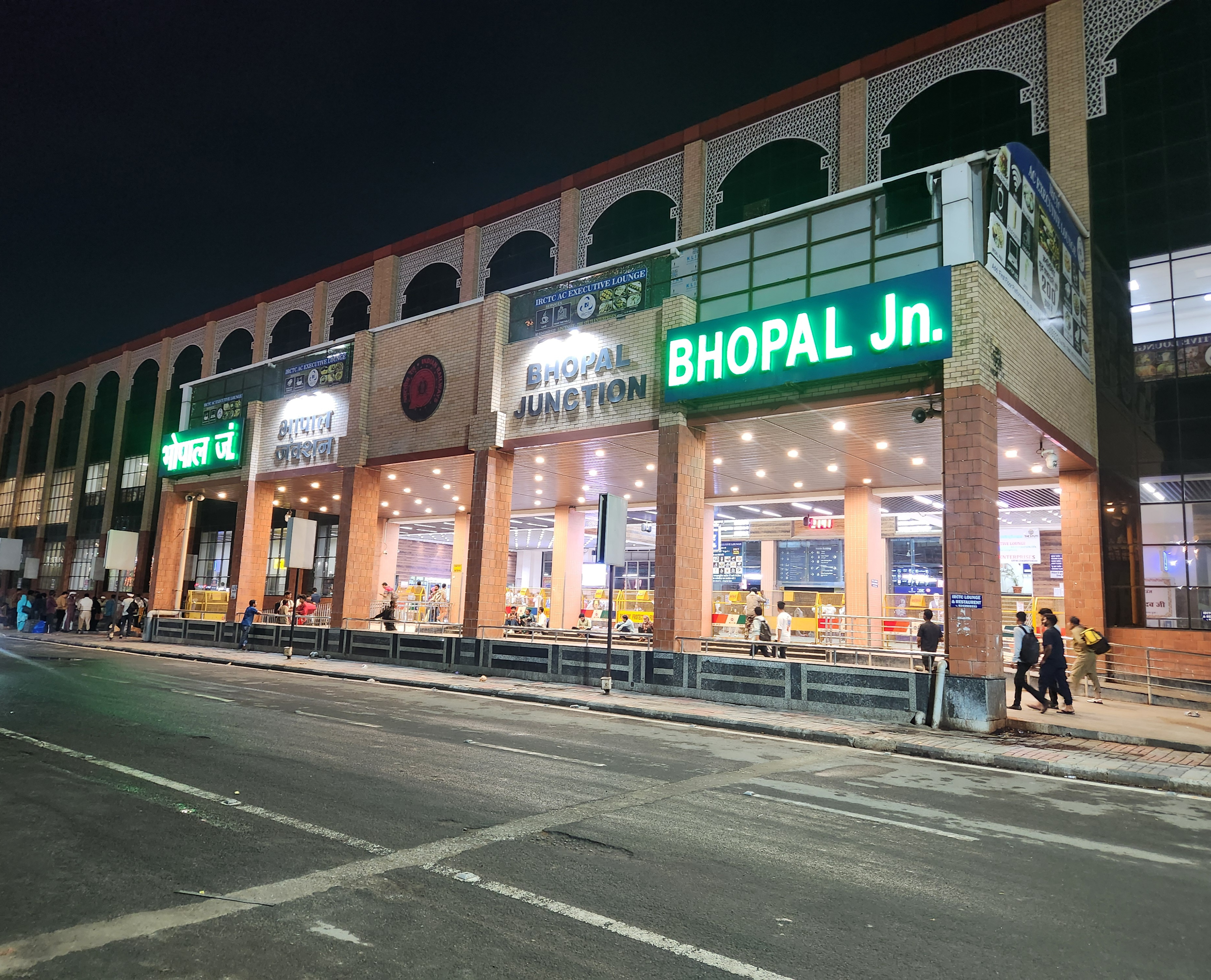
- Bhopal Junction railway station

Overview
- Owner: West Central Railway zone
- Locale: Bhopal, Madhya Pradesh, India
- Stations: 93

Service
- Type: Railway division
- System: Indian Railways

History
- Opened: 1 April 1952; 74 years ago

Bhopal railway division is one of the three railway divisions falling under West Central Railway zone (WCR) of Indian Railways. This railway division was formed on 1 April 1952 and its headquarters are located at Rani Kamalapati railway station, Bhopal in the state of Madhya Pradesh of India.

Jabalpur railway division and Kota railway division being the other two. West Central Railway zone's headquarters are at Jabalpur.

== Geographical jurisdiction ==
The Bhopal division extends from Khandwa Junction (excluding) in the south to Bina Junction (including) in the north on the Mumbai–Delhi main line route. Its branch lines extend from Bina Junction (excluding) to Maksi Junction (excluding) via Guna Junction, from Guna Junction to Kota Junction (excluding), and from Guna Junction to Gwalior Junction (excluding).

== Track configuration ==
The section between Khandwa Junction and Itarsi Junction is a double-line section, while the stretch from Itarsi Junction through Bhopal Junction to Bina Junction is a triple-line section. The Bina–Guna, Guna–Kota, and Guna–Maksi branch lines are single-line sections undergoing doubling, whereas the Guna–Gwalior branch line is a single-line section.

== List of railway stations and towns ==
The list includes the stations under the Bhopal railway division and their station category.

| Category of station | No. of stations | Names of stations |
|---|---|---|
| A-1 Category | 1 | Bhopal Junction |
| A Category | 5 | Bina Junction, Itarsi Junction, Narmadapuram, Rani Kamalapati, Vidisha |
| B Category | 5 | Guna Junction, Ganj Basoda, Harda, Sanchi, Shivpuri |
| C Category | 12 | Ashoknagar, Banapura, Biyavra Rajgarh, Chhanera, Gulabganj, Khirkiya, Mandi Bamora, Mandideep, Mungaoli, Ruthiyai Junction, Timarni, Talvadiya Junction |
| D Category | 53 | Badarwas, Bareth, Barkhera, Barud, Bhairopur, Bhirangi, Bir, Budhni, Chachaura Binaganj, Charkheda, Charkheda Khurd, Dagarkhedi, Dewanganj, Dharamkundi, Dolariya, Ghatigaon, Guneru Bamori, Hinotia Pipalkhera, Kanjia, Kolaras, Kumbhraj, Kurwai Kethora, Maban, Mahadev Khedi, Mahugarha, Masangaon, Mathela, Misrod, Mohana, Obaidulla Ganj, Orr, Pabai, Pachor Road, Pagara, Pagdhal, Palasner, Panihar, Parhana Mau, Pilighat, Pipraigaon, Powarkheda, Ratikheda, Salamatpur, Sarangpur, Semarkhedi, Shahdora Gaon, Shajapur, Sinduriya Kachari, Sukhi Sewaniya, Sumer, Surgaon Banjari, Vijay Pur. |
| E Category; Halt Station | 17 | Bhadbhada Ghat, Chauhani, Chhidgaon, Khaigaon, Khajri, Khonker, Khutwansa, Lukwasa, Kurawan, Miyana, Parakheda, Raghogarh, Rayser, Rahatwas, Renhat, Siroliya, Taravata. |

Stations closed for passengers: Harsud, Singaji, Piplani
