= Gwalior–Kota railway line =

Narrow gauge railway in India

Gwalior–Kota Railway Line

Overview
- Owner: North Central Railway
- Locale: Madhya Pradesh, Rajasthan
- Termini: Gwalior Junction; Kota Junction

Service
- Operator: North Central Railway

History
- Opened: 2029

Technical
- Line length: 284 km (176 mi)
- Track gauge: 1,676 mm (5 ft 6 in)
- Electrification: Yes

The Gwalior–Kota railway line is a proposed railway route connecting Gwalior in Madhya Pradesh with Kota in Rajasthan via Sheopur Kalan. The project includes the conversion of the existing Gwalior–Sheopur Kalan railway line from narrow gauge to broad gauge and the construction of a new broad-gauge line from Sheopur Kalan to Kota. Connecting Gwalior region to Bundelkhand region and with Rajasthan. The proposed route will establish a direct railway connection between Gwalior, Sheopur and Kota and provide an alternative rail link between Madhya Pradesh and Rajasthan.

== History ==
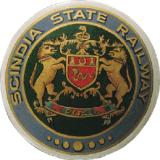
Logo from 1942 until 1947

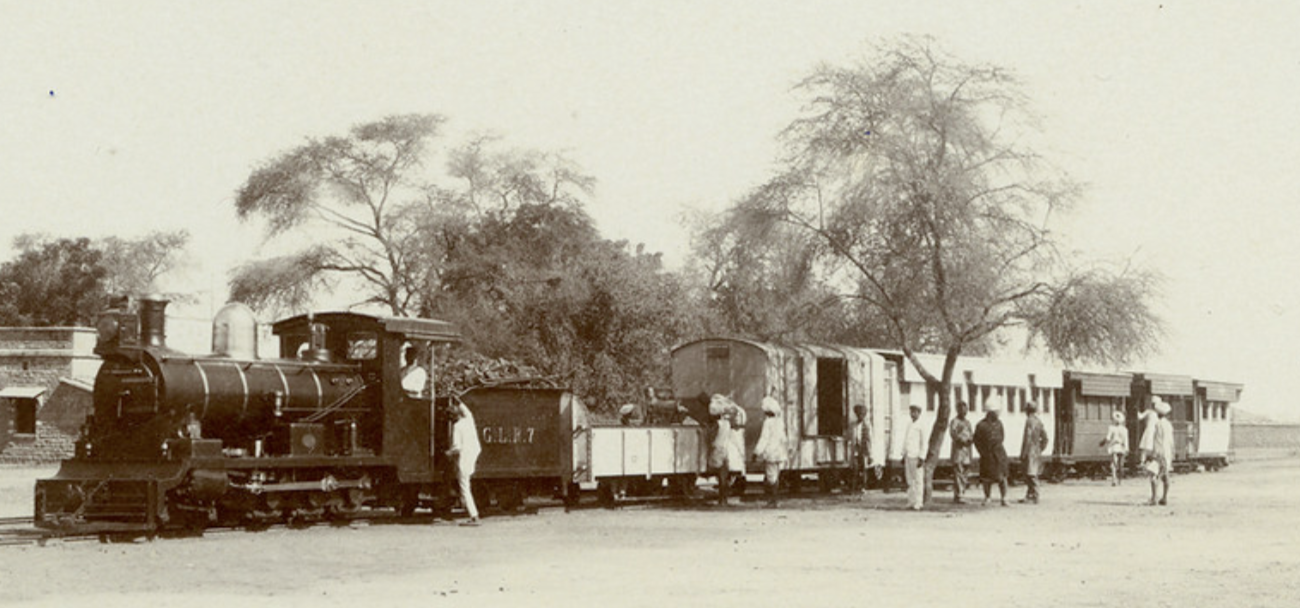
Train at Gola ka Mandir Railway Station, Gwalior in 1904

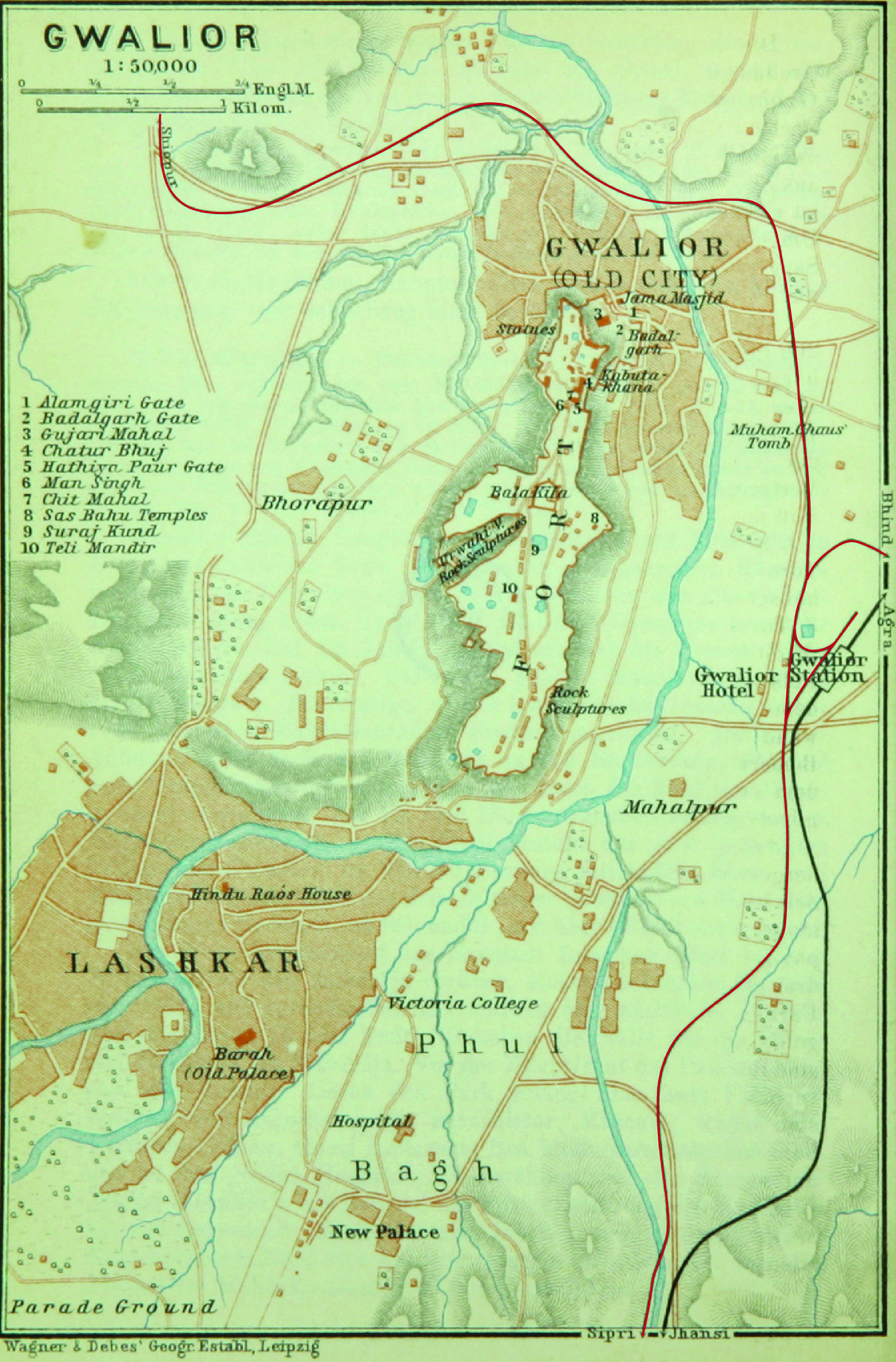
Gwalior in 1914 with the Gwalior Light Railway highlighted in red

The Gwalior Light Railway was built by the Maharaja Madho Rao Scindia of the Gwalior State. It was originally a 14-mile long private tramway. Construction began in 1895 of the 53 mile Gwalior–Bhind line. By 1897 it was 34 miles long and was used to bring in supplies to relieve the famine. Both this section and the Gwalior–Shivpuri section opened on 2 December 1899 by Lord Curzon the Viceroy of India. The Gwalior-Joura branch opened on 1 January 1904 and on 12 January 1904 the extension to Sabalgarh was opened. A further extension to Birpur opened on 1 November 1908 and the full line to Sheopur opened on 15 June 1909. In October 1900, the Indian Midland Railway Company agreed to operate the railway on behalf of the Maharaja.

In 1942, the Gwalior Light Railway was renamed the Scindia State Railway. In 1951, the system was purchased by the Central Railway.

The railway was initially worked with steam locomotives, but later diesel locomotives were used. There was a plan to electrify the railway in the 1920s from a generating station below the Nanakura Dam, but this scheme was abandoned.

== Permanent way ==
The track was 30 lb/yd (15 kg/m) flat-bottomed steel rails laid on a mix of Sal wood and iron sleepers. The minimum radius curve on the line was 955 feet (291 m) and the steepest gradient was 1 in 40.

== Locomotives ==
Number	Builder	Works number	Image	Wheel arrangement	Date built	Date scrapped	Notes
	Kerr, Stuart and Company			0-4-2T	1893		The railway's original locomotive
1	Kerr, Stuart and Company			0-6-4T			
2	Kerr, Stuart and Company			0-6-4T			
3	Kerr, Stuart and Company			0-6-4T			
4	Kerr, Stuart and Company			0-6-4T			
5	Kerr, Stuart and Company			4-6-0	1904		
6	Kerr, Stuart and Company			4-6-0	1904		
7	Kerr, Stuart and Company			4-6-0	1904		
8	Kerr, Stuart and Company			4-6-0	1904		
9	Kerr, Stuart and Company			4-6-0	1904		
10	Kerr, Stuart and Company			4-6-0	1904		
11	Kerr, Stuart and Company			4-6-0	1904		
12	Kerr, Stuart and Company			4-6-0	1904		
18	Kerr, Stuart and Company			4-6-0	1915		
	Kerr, Stuart and Company			2-8-2	1917		
26	Kerr, Stuart and Company	4400		2-8-2	1928		
27	Kerr, Stuart and Company	4401		2-8-2	1928		
28	Kerr, Stuart and Company	4402		2-8-2	1928		
29	Kerr, Stuart and Company	4403		2-8-2	1928		
34	W. G. Bagnall	2453		4-6-2	1931		
35	W. G. Bagnall	2454		4-6-2	1931		
36	W. G. Bagnall	2455		4-6-2	1931		
37	W. G. Bagnall	2456		4-6-2	1931		
38	W. G. Bagnall	2457		4-6-2	1931		Preserved on the Vale of Rheidol Light Railway
39	W. G. Bagnall	2458		4-6-2	1931		
40	W. G. Bagnall	2459		4-6-2	1931		
41	W. G. Bagnall	2460		4-6-2	1931		Preserved on the Vale of Rheidol Light Railway
42	Baldwin Locomotive Works	74071		2-8-2	1948	1995	NH/4 class
43	Baldwin Locomotive Works			2-8-2	1948		NH/4 class. Preserved.
44	Baldwin Locomotive Works			2-8-2	1948	1995	NH/4 class
45	Baldwin Locomotive Works			2-8-2	1948	1995	NH/4 class
	Nippon Sharyo			2-8-2	1959		NH/5 class
	Nippon Sharyo			2-8-2	1959		NH/5 class
	Nippon Sharyo			2-8-2	1959		NH/5 class
	Nippon Sharyo			2-8-2	1959		NH/5 class

== Rolling stock ==
In 1936, the company owned 28 locomotives, 90 coaches and 363 goods wagons.

== Classification ==
It was labeled as a Class III railway according to Indian Railway Classification System of 1926.

== Conversion to broad gauge ==
The Gwalior–Bhind section and the Gwalior–Shivpuri section were converted to 1,676 mm (5 ft 6 in) broad gauge in the early 2010s. The Gwalior–Sheopur Kalan section is under conversion to 1,676 mm (5 ft 6 in) broad gauge as of 2020.

== See also ==
- Nizam's Guaranteed State Railway
