= Gwalior–Indore line =

Railway line in India

Gwalior–Indore railway line
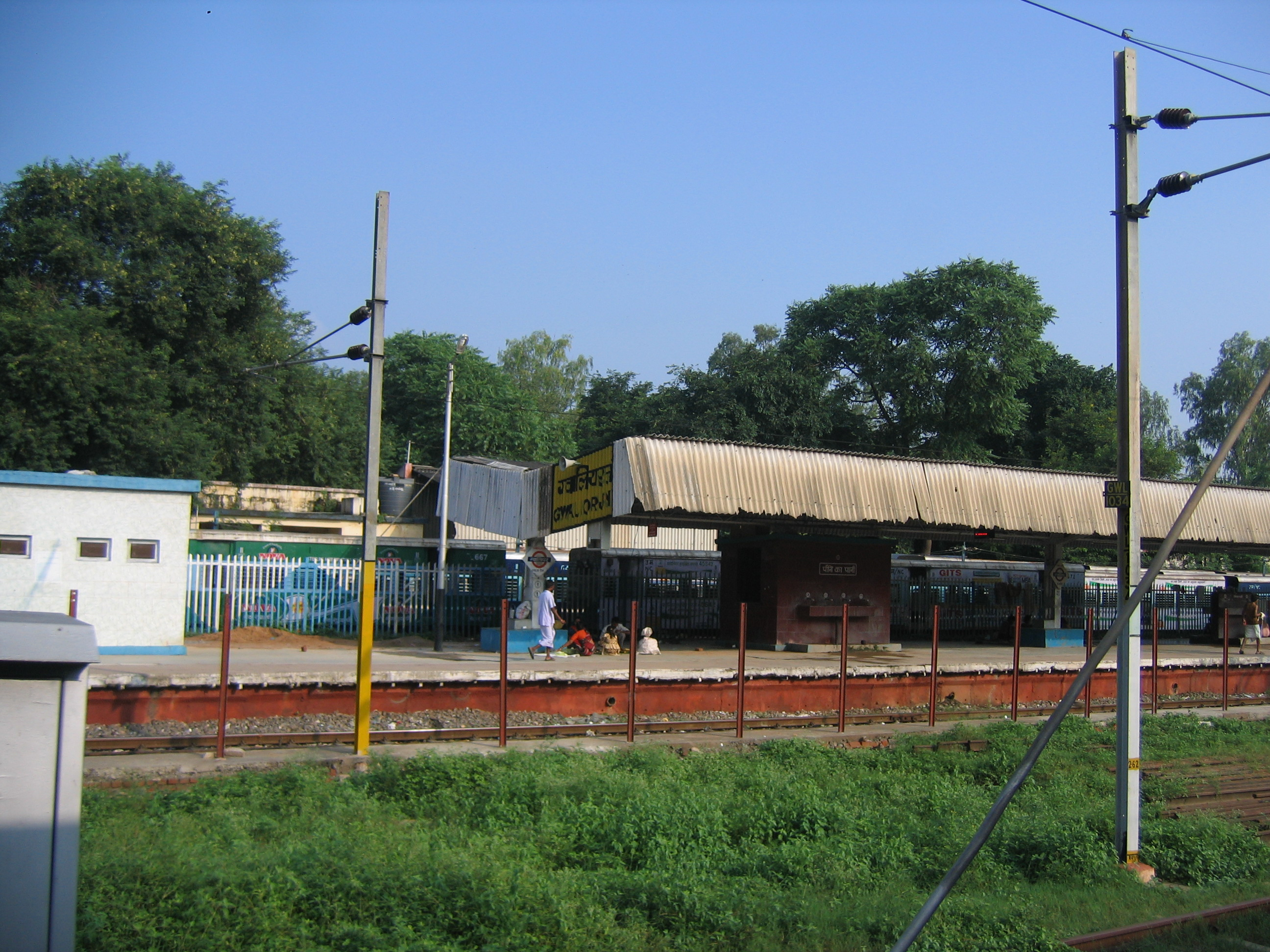
- Gwalior Junction the starting point on Gwalior–Indore railway line

Overview
- Status: Operational
- Owner: Indian Railways
- Locale: Madhya Pradesh & Rajasthan
- Termini: Gwalior Junction; Indore Junction

Service
- Operator(s): Western Railway; West Central Railway; North Central Railway
- Rolling stock: WDM-2, WDM-3A, WDG-3A, WDG-3C, WAG-5 and WAG-7

History
- Opened: 1899

Technical
- Line length: 544 KM
- Track gauge: 5 ft 6 in (1,676 mm) broad gauge
- Electrification: Yes
- Operating speed: up to 130 km/h

Gwalior–Indore railway line is a broad-gauge railway line in the Indian state of Madhya Pradesh. It connects Gwalior in northern Madhya Pradesh with Indore in western Madhya Pradesh. The line passes through important cities and railway junctions including Shivpuri, Guna Junction railway station, Ruthiyai Junction railway station, Biaora, Maksi and Dewas.

The railway line forms an important rail link between the Gwalior Chambal region, Bundelkhand region and the Malwa region of Madhya Pradesh. It provides connectivity between Gwalior and Indore and also connects with several major railway routes at junction stations along the line.

The route has historical links with the former Gwalior Light Railway, particularly the Gwalior–Shivpuri section, which was originally constructed as a narrow-gauge railway. The railway network was subsequently converted to broad gauge in phases.

The Gwalior–Indore route serves passenger and freight traffic and provides connections to other important destinations in Madhya Pradesh and neighbouring states.

== History ==
In 1899, The 119.7 kilometres (74.4 mi) long Gwalior–Shivpuri line was opened by Schindia State railway as a light rail. Later it was transferred to Gwalior Light Railway. The light rail line used to run via Kampoo, Panihar, Ghatigaon, Mohana, Mansapoorah, Satanwara, Shivpuri, Kolaras & Badarwas. The line was converted to Broad gauge in 1997-1999 period & the alignment got changed between Mohana & Shivpuri. Old stations of Mansapoorah & Satanwara got abandoned & Mudkhera Karsana, Nayagaon & Khajuri got connected by rail. The new route is 124.2 kilometres (77.2 mi) now & is a single electrified line.

In 1932, 68.9 kilometres (42.8 mi)long Agar–Ujjain section was opened by Gwalior light railways. But constant losses up to 1997 made Ujjain-Agar Line getting abandoned & scrapped by 1999.

== Main line & subbranches network ==
- Gwalior-Indore line main branch (existing): it is 516 kilometres (321 mi) long electrified double line. This line has following subbranches forking out from the main route.

  - Bina-Guna line subbranch (existing): The first branch line is double electrified line from Bina Junction to Guna Junction with the Length of 118.80 kilometres (73.82 mi).

  - Ruthiyai-Kota line subbranch (existing): The second branch line is double electrified line from Ruthiyai Junction to Kota Junction with the length of 164.2 kilometres (102.0 mi).

  - Bhopal-Nagda line subbranch (existing): The third branch line is the double electrified line from Bhopal Junction to Nagda Junction with the length of 240 kilometres (150 mi).

  - Bhopal-Ramganj Mandi line subbranch (under-construction): The new line from Ramganj Mandi Junction to Bhopal Junction via Jhalawar, Aklera, Biyavra Rajgarh, Parbatigarh, Sant Hirdaramnagar branches off from the Indore–Gwalior Mainline with the length of 333 kilometres (207 mi). It will reduce the traffic on the existing Nagda–Maksi–Bhopal line and Kota–Bina line by facilitating a new route for transport to southern states and eastern states of India.

  - Ujjain-Dewas line subbranch (existing): The fourth branch line is the double electrified line from Ujjain Junction to Dewas Junction with the length of 41.3 kilometres (25.7 mi).

  - Ujjain-Agar line subbranch (proposed): The 76 kilometres (47 mi) long, historic narrow gauge line which was closed in 1975, will be rebuilt as a new broad-gauge line with extension to Jhalawar. The Final Location Survey (FLS) and Detailed Project Report (DPR) were recently in progress, but as of 2026 reports, but it is being prioritised for commencing construction in future.

- Indore–Dr. Ambedkar Nagar line main line (existing): 21 kilometres (13 mi) long line from Indore to Dr. Ambedkar Nagar railway station.

- Dr. Ambedkar Nagar-Manmad line main branch (under-construction): 309 kilometres (192 mi) long line from Dr. Ambedkar Nagar railway station to Manmad Junction railway station, with 34 stations (30 new and 4 existing, including 17 new and 1 existing on 170 km long route in Madhya Pradesh and 13 new and 3 existing on 139 km long route in Maharashtra), will be completed by 2028-29. 18 stations in Madhya Pradesh across 4 districts (Indore, Dhar, Khargone, Badwani) are :Dr Ambedkar Nagar (existing), Kelod, Kamadpur, Jhadibaroda, Saray Talab, Neemgad, Chikatyawad, Gyaspur Khedi, Kothada, Jarwah, Ajandi, Baghadi, Kusmari, Jhulwania, Salikalan, Wanihar, Bawadad, and Malwan. 18 stations in Madhya Pradesh are: Sangvi BK (BK in Mahrashtra in village nameis short for Budruk which means "Greater"), Lauki, Shirpur, Dabhashi, Nardana (existing), New Dhule(existing), Kasbe Lalingnan, Purmepada, Zodge, Chikhalhol, Malegaon, Yesgaon BK, Mehun, Chondhi, Khatgaon, and Manmad (existing). Project will promote tourism in the region by providing shorter route between Western/ South-Western part of the country with Central India. This will increase the tourist footfall to various tourist/ religious places of Ujjain – Indore region including Sri Mahakaleshwar Jyotirlinga Temple.

== See also ==
- Future of rail transport in India
  - Bhopal-Ramganj Mandi line, under-construction with target completion by December 2027, will provide shorter route from Ludiana-Hisar-Jaipur-Kota to Bhopal
  - Manmad–Indore line, target completion date of 2028-29.
  - Indore-Dahod line
  - Chhota Udaipur–Dhar line, target completion date of 2027.
  - Wardha–Nanded line, under-construction via Yavatmal-Pusad target completion by 2027-28, will provide shorter route from North India to Pusad-Nanded.
- Existing
  - Mathura–Vadodara section
  - Chhota Udaipur–Dhar line
  - Indore-Dewas-Ujjain section
