= West Central Railway zone =

Indian Railway zone

West Central Railway

Overview
- Headquarters: Jabalpur
- Locale: Madhya Pradesh; Uttar Pradesh; Rajasthan
- Dates of operation: 2003; 23 years ago–present
- Predecessor: Central Railway zone Western Railway zone

Technical
- Track gauge: Mixed
- Electrification: 3,012 kilometres (1,872 mi)
- Length: 2,911 kilometres (1,809 mi)

Other
- Website: www.wcr.indianrailways.gov.in

The West Central Railway (abbreviated WCR), one of the 19 zones of the Indian Railways, came into existence on 3 April 2003. It is headquartered at Jabalpur. It was created by taking away two divisions namely Bhopal division and Jabalpur division from central railways and one division namely Kota division from Western Railway zone. The WCR zone provides rail route coverage to the west central region of India. Most of its route is in the states of Madhya Pradesh and Rajasthan with a very little portion in the state of Uttar Pradesh.

== History ==
On 3 April 2003, the West Central Railway was reconstituted from parts of Central Railway and Western Railway by allocating Jabalpur and Bhopal divisions of the Central Railway zone (CR) and the reorganized Kota of the Western Railway zone (WR) to WCR.

== Jurisdiction ==
The zone serves eastern & central Madhya Pradesh, southern Uttar Pradesh, and northeastern Rajasthan state. It contains the Tuglakabad (TKD) locomotive shed, which belongs to Kota Division of WCR but is situated in the Northern Railways territory. WCR meets Northern Railway at Mathura, Western Railway at Nagda, North Western Railway at Chittorgarh, Central Railway at Khandwa and Itarsi, North Central Railway at Bina and Manikpur, South East Central Railway at Katni and East Central Railway at Singaroli stations.

== Divisions ==
There are 3 divisions in West Central Railway zone, and those are

- Kota railway division
- Jabalpur railway division
- Bhopal railway division

== Loco sheds ==
There are five loco sheds in WCR.

- Electric Loco Shed, Tughlakabad
- Electric Loco Shed, Itarsi
- Diesel Loco Shed, New Katni Junction
- Electric Loco Shed, New Katni Junction
- Diesel Loco Shed, Itarsi

== Tourist places ==
The following places of tourist interest are located on the rail route of WCR:

- Bandhavgarh National Park,
- Bhojpur,
- Ranthambore National Park,
- Bharatpur,
- Jabalpur,
- Sanchi,
- Bhimbaithka,
- Kanha National Park,
- Shivpuri National Park,
- Bhopal,
- Kota,
- Vidisha,
- Bundi,
- Pachmarhi,
- Pench Tiger Reserve,
- Panna National Park and
- Maihar

== See also ==
- All India Station Masters' Association (AISMA)
- Rail transport in Madhya Pradesh
