= Pichhore, Madhya Pradesh =

Town in Madhya Pradesh

Pichhore
- City
- PICHHORE
- Location in Madhya Pradesh, India Pichhore (India)
- Coordinates: 25°10′42″N 78°11′19″E
- Country: India
- State: Madhya Pradesh
- District: Shivpuri

Government
  - Type: nagar panchayat
- Elevation: 370 m (1,210 ft)

Population (2011)
  - Total: 18,127

Languages
  - Official: Hindi
- Time zone: UTC+5:30 (IST)
- Postal code: 473995
- Vehicle registration: MP33

Pichhore is a town and a nagar panchayat in Shivpuri district in the Indian state of Madhya Pradesh. It's also a tehsil headquarter and Development block. it's located in Bundelkhand region of Madhya Pradesh.

== Demographics ==
As of 2011 India census, Pichhore had a population of 18,127. Males constitute 53% of the population and females 47%. Pichhore has an average literacy rate of 64%, higher than the national average of 59.5%: male literacy is 70%, and female literacy is 58%. In Pichhore, 14% of the population is under 6 years of age.

== Geography ==
Coordinates of this town are 25°10'25"N 78°11'18"E. Dhala crater (N25°17'59.7" and E78°8'3.1") is situated in Shivpuri district, Madhya Pradesh State, India. Currently, the diameter of the structure is estimated at 11 km based on field observations.

== Government ==
Pichhore (constituency number 26) is one of the 5 Vidhan Sabha constituencies located in Shivpuri district. This constituency covers Pichhore nagar panchayat and part of Pichhore tehsil of the district. Pichhore is part of Guna Lok Sabha constituency.

== Transportation ==
It is Also linked with Train route from Basai railway station situated 35 km from Pichhore. It's well connected with nearby cities like Shivpuri, Jhansi, Chanderi, Datia and Khaniyadhana by daily bus services.

== See Also ==
- Bhonti
