= Bhonti =

Town located in Shivpuri district of Madhya Pradesh

- Town
- Location in Madhya Pradesh, India
- Coordinates: 25.32°N 78.09°E
- Country: India
- State: Madhya Pradesh
- District: Shivpuri

Population (2011)
  - Total: 6,083

Bhonti is a Town located in Shivpuri district of Madhya Pradesh. Bhonti town's pin code is 473670. Bhonti belongs to Pichhore Tehsil.

== Demographics ==
As per census of India 2011 The Bhonti town has population of 6083 of which 3217 are males while 2866 are females.

== Dhala impact structure ==
The Dhala impact structure (N25°17'59.7" and E78°8'3.1") is an impact structure formed by an asteroid impact. It is situated near Bhonti village in Pichhore block of Shivpuri district of Madhya Pradesh state in India. It is the largest impact structure in India, and between the Mediterranean and Southeast Asia. The diameter of the structure is estimated at 3 kilometres (1.9 mi),

== Transportation ==
Bhonti is well connected with roads. It's around 65 km away from Shivpuri and 25 km away from Pichhore.

Daily bus service available in the town.
