= Dinara, Madhya Pradesh =

Dinara
- Town
- Location in Madhya Pradesh, India
- Coordinates: 25.47°N 78.33°E
- Country: India
- State: Madhya Pradesh
- District: Shivpuri district

Government
  - Type: Gram Panchayat

Population (2011)
  - Total: 9,310

Languages
  - Official: Hindi
- Time zone: UTC+5:30 (IST)
- Pin Code: 473665
- Vehicle registration: MP-33

Dinara is a major town in the Shivpuri District of Madhya Pradesh. There is a police station in the town.

== Geography ==
Dinara is located on 25.47°N 78.33°E. It is 72 kilometres (45 mi) away from District Headquarter Shivpuri.

== Demographics ==
As of the Census of India 2011, Dinara has a population of 9,310; 4,826 are males and 4,484 are females.

== Transportation ==
National Highway 27 passes through Dinara, connecting it from Jhansi to Shivpuri and Karera. Public and private buses operate regularly in the town.
