= Karera =

- Municipality
- Janpad karera
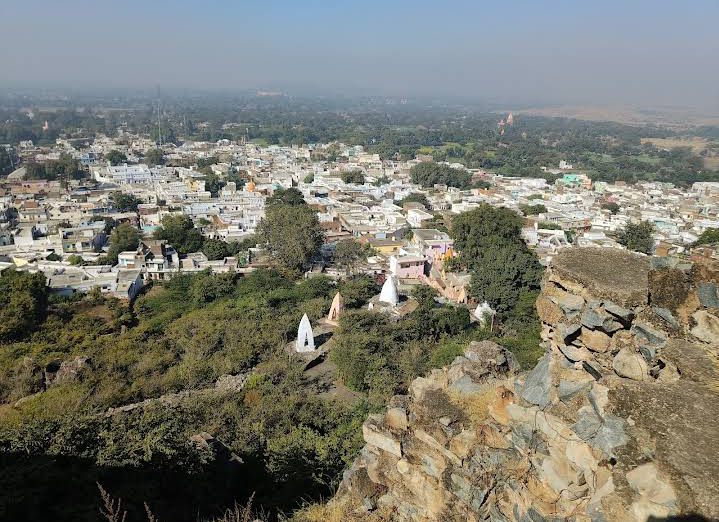
- View Of Karera From Fort

- Location in Madhya Pradesh, India
- Coordinates: 25.47°N 78.15°E
- Country: India
- State: Madhya Pradesh
- District: Shivpuri
- [Subdistrict]: Karera

Government
  - Type: Congress
  - MLA: Mr. Pragilal Jatav
  - Rank: 2nd (in district)
- Elevation: 305 m (1,001 ft)

Population (2017)
  - Total: 138,000
  - Rank: 2nd (in district)

Languages
  - Official: Hindi, English
- Time zone: UTC+5:30 (IST)
- PIN: 473660
- Telephone code: +91-7493
- ISO 3166 code: MP-IN
- Vehicle registration: MP 33

Karera is a municipality or Nagar Parishad in the Shivpuri district of the Indian state of Madhya Pradesh.

== Geography ==
Karera is the second-largest city in the Shivpuri district after Shivpuri itself. Karera is located at 25.47°N 78.15°E. It has an average elevation of 305 meters (1000 feet) and covers approximately 41.8 km.

== Demographics ==
According to the 2011 India census, Karera has a population of over 28,000. Males constitute 55% of the population, while females constitute 45%. Sixteen percent of the population is under 6 years of age. Karera has an average literacy rate of 78%, higher than the national average of 59.5%. Male literacy is 83% and female literacy is 64%.

== Tourist attractions ==
There are six Jain Temples. Other attractions include:

- Karera Fort
- Amola Wali Dukkaiyya
- Foota Taal
- Mahuar River
- MP's longest river bridge Amola approximately 2 km
- Samoha Dam
- Rest House karera
- "Nursery" Filter Road
- Machhawali
- Chaturbhuj Temple (Ancient temple)
- Machhawali Mata Temple
- Bagicha sarkar Temple
- khedapati Hanuman Temple
- Chaitanya ashram jhanda
- Siddhan
- Kacchi galii

=== Karera Wildlife Sanctuary ===
The Karera Wildlife Sanctuary was established in 1981, and spans an area of 202 km^{2}. The sanctuary is managed by the field director of Madhav National Park in Shivpuri district.

== Communication services ==
Karera is covered by an extensive fiber optic network. The Karera fixed telephone line operator in the city is BSNL. There are eight mobile phone companies in Karera, which include BSNL, VI 4G, Airtel 4G, Jio 5G, are offered by BSNL 3G. Internet broadband and IPTV services are provided by BSNL. The city is also connected to Digital TV.

== Transport ==
=== Roads ===
Karera is connected with neighboring cities and other major cities of India by road (NH-25) Shivpuri, (NH-27) Jhansi, Sagar, Datia, Dinara, Dabra, Lucknow, Indore, Bhopal, Guna, Gwalior, Kota, Orai, Kanpur, Allahabad, Ajmer, Jaipur, Udaipur, Ahmedabad.

Daily buses services operate within the city, with inter-city services also available daily to many cities in Madhya Pradesh, Uttar Pradesh and Rajasthan.

=== Railway ===
Karera is not directly accessible by rail, with the nearest railway stations located in Jhansi 45 km to the east and Shivpuri 55 km west of the city.

=== Airways ===
The nearest major airport is located at Gwalior which operates flights to Delhi, Bhopal, Indore, Mumbai, Pune, Ahmedabad, Jabalpur, Jaipur, and most large cities in India.
