= Khaniadhana State =

Indian Princely State

Coordinates: 25°01′30″N 78°11′30″E

- Princely State
- 1724–1948
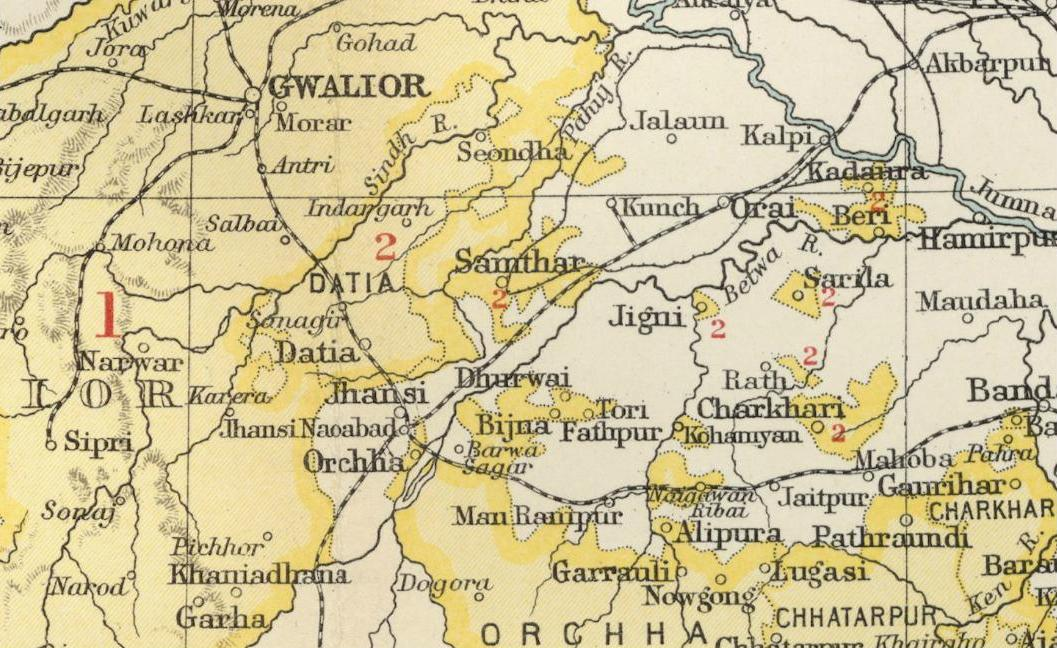
- Khaniadhana State in the Imperial Gazetteer of India
- Area
  - 1941: 176 km^{2} (68 sq mi)
- Population
  - 1941: 20,124
- History
  - Established: 1724
  - Independence of India: 1948
Succeeded by
India

Khaniadhana or Khaniyadhana was a princely state of British India ruled by the Judev dynasty of Bundela Rajputs. The capital of the State was Khaniadhana. It was part of the Bundelkhand Agency and later the Central India Agency.

The princely state of Khaniadhana, was made of several small enclaves, bounded on the east by the British district of Jhansi but otherwise completely surrounded by the Narwar district of Gwalior State. Khaniadhana State was part of the Gwalior Residency. It was located to the west of Orchha State. It covered a total area of 101 sq m spread over 55 villages and the total population of the territory during the British rule was 20,124 as per census of 1941.

== History ==
In 1724, Raja Udot Singh of Orchha State granted Khaniadhana and several other villages to his son Amar Singh. When the Marathas became the paramount power in Bundelkhand, the Peshwa granted Amar Singh a sanad in 1751 confirming him in his grant. After this time, suzerainty was always in dispute between Orchha and the Maratha state of Jhansi, the Peshwa's eventual successor. When Jhansi State lapsed in 1854, the Khanadhiana jagirdar claimed absolute independence. The matter was only settled in 1862 when Khaniadhana was declared to be directly dependent from the British government as successor to the Jhansi darbar and the Peshwa. The State was one of the original constituent members of the Chamber of Princes, an institution established in 1920.

In 1948, the Khaniadhana State acceded to the Union of India and about half of Khaniadhana (27 villages) was included in Shivpuri district of Madhya Bharat while the other half (28 villages) was included in Vindhya Pradesh., which all are now part of Madhya Pradesh.

=== Rulers ===
The ruling family of Khaniadhana were Bundela Rajputs. The ruler of the princely state of Khaniadhana held the hereditary title of Rao or Jagirdar, but from the year 1911, the ruler was granted the title and style of Raja. It was a non-salute state and the native ruler or the Raja of the princely state exercised the powers and authority of a ruling chief.

==== Rajas ====
- 1724–1760;. Amar Singh
- 1760–1869 Unknown succession of Rajas
- 1869–1909 Chitra Singh
- 1909–1938 Khalak Singh
- 1938–1948 Davendra Pratap Singh
- 1948~today Bhanu Pratap Singh
