= Pohari =

Town in Madhya Pradesh, India

Pohari Pohri
- Town
- Location in Madhya Pradesh, India Pohari (India)
- Coordinates: 25.53°N 77.36°E
- Country: India
- State: Madhya Pradesh
- District: Shivpuri
- Elevation: 460 m (1,510 ft)

Population (2011)
  - Total: 5,993

Languages
  - Official: Hindi
- Time zone: UTC+5:30 (IST)
- Postal code: 473770
- ISO 3166 code: IN-MP
- Vehicle registration: MP-33

Pohari, also Pohri, is a town and a nagar parishad in Shivpuri District of Madhya Pradesh, India. It is also a tehsil and assembly constituency.

== Geography ==
Pohari is located at 25.53°N 77.36°E. It has an average elevation of 508 metres (1669 feet). It is located 35 kilometres from Shivpuri.

== Demographics ==
Pohari town has a population of 5993 of which 3087 are males while 2906 are females as at the census of 2011.

== Politics ==
Pohari constituency number 24 is one of the five Vidhan Sabha constituencies located in Shivpuri district. This constituency covers the entire Pohari tehsil and parts of Shivpuri and Narwar tehsils of the district.

== Town administration ==
Pohari is a nagar panchayat city in the district of Shivpuri in Madhya Pradesh. Pohari city is divided into 15 wards for which elections are held every five years.

== Places of interest ==
Pohari contains the following places of interest:

- Jal Mandir Pohari
- Kedareshwar Mandir Pohari

== Education ==
=== Higher education ===
Pohari contains the following colleges:

- Govt. I.T.I. Pohari
- LSGK College Pohari

== Transportation ==
Pohari is well connected by road. Shivpuri is 35 kilometres, Gwalior 125 kilometres and Jhansi 130 kilometres from Pohari. A daily bus service is available in Pohari and the nearest airport is Gwalior Airport.
