= Government Medical College, Shivpuri =

Shrimant Rajmata Vijayaraje Scindia Medical College
- Type: Government
- Established: 2017; 9 years ago
- Academic affiliations: Madhya Pradesh Medical Science University
- Dean: Dr.Ila Gujaria
- Location: Shivpuri, India; 25.457°N 77.673°E
- Website: www.shivpurimedicalcollege.com

Shrimant Rajmata Vijayaraje Scindia Medical College is a full-fledged tertiary medical college in Shivpuri, Madhya Pradesh. It was established in the year 2017. The college imparts the degree of Bachelor of Medicine and Surgery (MBBS). Nursing and para-medical courses are also offered. The college is affiliated to Madhya Pradesh Medical Science University and is recognized by National Medical Commission. The selection to the college is done on the basis of merit through NEET.

== Hospital & Clinical facilities ==
The Shrimant Rajmata Vijayraje Scindia Medical College Hospital, attached to the government medical college, is a 460-bedded NABH-accredited multi-speciality hospital. It provides 24x7 emergency and trauma care, along with specialized services such as blood bank, critical care, burn treatment, pharmacy, and physiotherapy. The hospital encompasses a wide range of specialty departments, including General Medicine, Surgery, Pediatrics, Orthopedics, OBGY, and more. This ensures that our students receive hands-on clinical training and that the community benefits from comprehensive healthcare services.

== Our Recognition & Afflication ==
We are proud to be recognized by the National Medical Commission (NMC), India, and are affiliated with the Madhya Pradesh Medical Sciences University, Jabalpur (MPMSU). This recognition ensures that our curriculum, faculty, and facilities meet the highest standards set for medical education in India. Our flagship program, the MBBS, admits 100 students annually, selected through a transparent and merit-based process.

== Campus & Infrastructure ==
The campus covers over 54 acres, thoughtfully designed to foster both academic excellence and holistic development. The college boasts state-of-the-art infrastructure, including spacious classrooms, modern lecture halls, well-equipped laboratories, and demonstration rooms. Our library is a hub of knowledge, offering an extensive collection of Indian and international medical books, journals, and a digital library, with dedicated reading spaces for students and faculty alike.

== Geography & Location ==
Shivpuri is in the Gwalior division of northwest Madhya Pradesh. It is 121 km from the city of Gwalior. The medical college is situated on the Agra Bombay Highway. a historic city in Madhya Pradesh, our college is strategically positioned to serve both urban and rural populations. Shivpuri is known for its rich cultural heritage and natural beauty, including lush forests and scenic lakes. The region’s diverse population and healthcare needs provide our students with invaluable exposure to a wide spectrum of medical cases, preparing them for future challenges in the medical field.

== Admission ==
The college has an annual intake of 100 candidates for M.B., B.S. (Bachelor's degree in Medicine and Surgery.

== Departments ==
- Anatomy
- Physiology
- Biochemistry
- Pharmacology
- Pathology
- Microbiology
- Forensic Medicine
- Community Medicine
- Ophthalmology
- Otolaryngology
- Medicine
- Surgery
- Obstetrics & Gynecology
- Pediatrics
- Anesthesiology
- Radiology
- Dermatology
- Orthopedics
- Psychiatry

== Affiliation ==
The medical college is affiliated to Madhya Pradesh Medical Science University, Jabalpur and is attached to District Hospital, Shivpuri.

== Inauguration ==
Jyotiraditya Scindia, Member of Parliament, officially inaugurated the Government Medical College, Shivpuri on 5 March 2019. Dr. Professor Jyoti Bindal is the first and founder dean.
