= Thakurpura =

Village in Madhya Pradesh, India

Thakurpura is a village in Shivpuri district of Madhya Pradesh state of India.
