= Madhav National Park =

National park in India

- IUCN category II (national park)
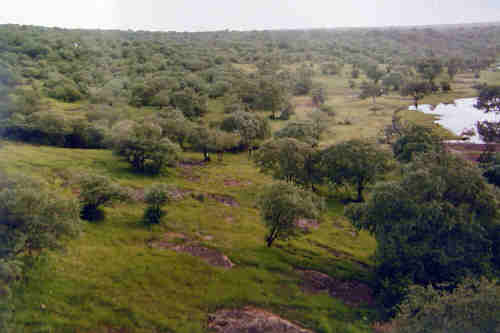
- Forest in Madhav National Park

- Location within Madhya Pradesh Location within India
- Interactive map of Madhav National Park
- Location: Madhya Pradesh, India
- Nearest city: Shivpuri around 9km away
- Coordinates: 25°30′N 77°49′E
- Area: 354 km^{2} (137 sq mi)
- Visitors: around 500 people (in every year)

Ramsar Wetland
- Official name: Sakhya Sagar
- Designated: 7 January 2022
- Reference no.: 2483

Madhav National Park is a national park in Shivpuri District of Gwalior division in northwest Madhya Pradesh, India. It was established in 1956 with 167 km^{2} (64 sq mi) as Shivpuri National Park. In 1958, it was renamed Madhav National Park after Madho Rao Scindia and was finalized the following year. Sakhya Sagar, a reservoir within the park, has been designated as a Ramsar site in 2022.

Two national highways pass through the park, the Gwalior to Bombay former National Highway 3 and the Jhansi to Shivpuri National Highway 27.

== History ==
The dense forests of Sipri later came to be known as Shivpuri doubled up as hunting grounds for Mughal emperors since the 16th century. Since then Mughal princes, Rajputana rulers, Gwalior royals and British dignitaries travelled to this area for hunting sprees. Therefore it came to be known as royal hunting park or Majestic Park due to high movement of Kings and high ranking British officials including British Monarch and Viceroys.

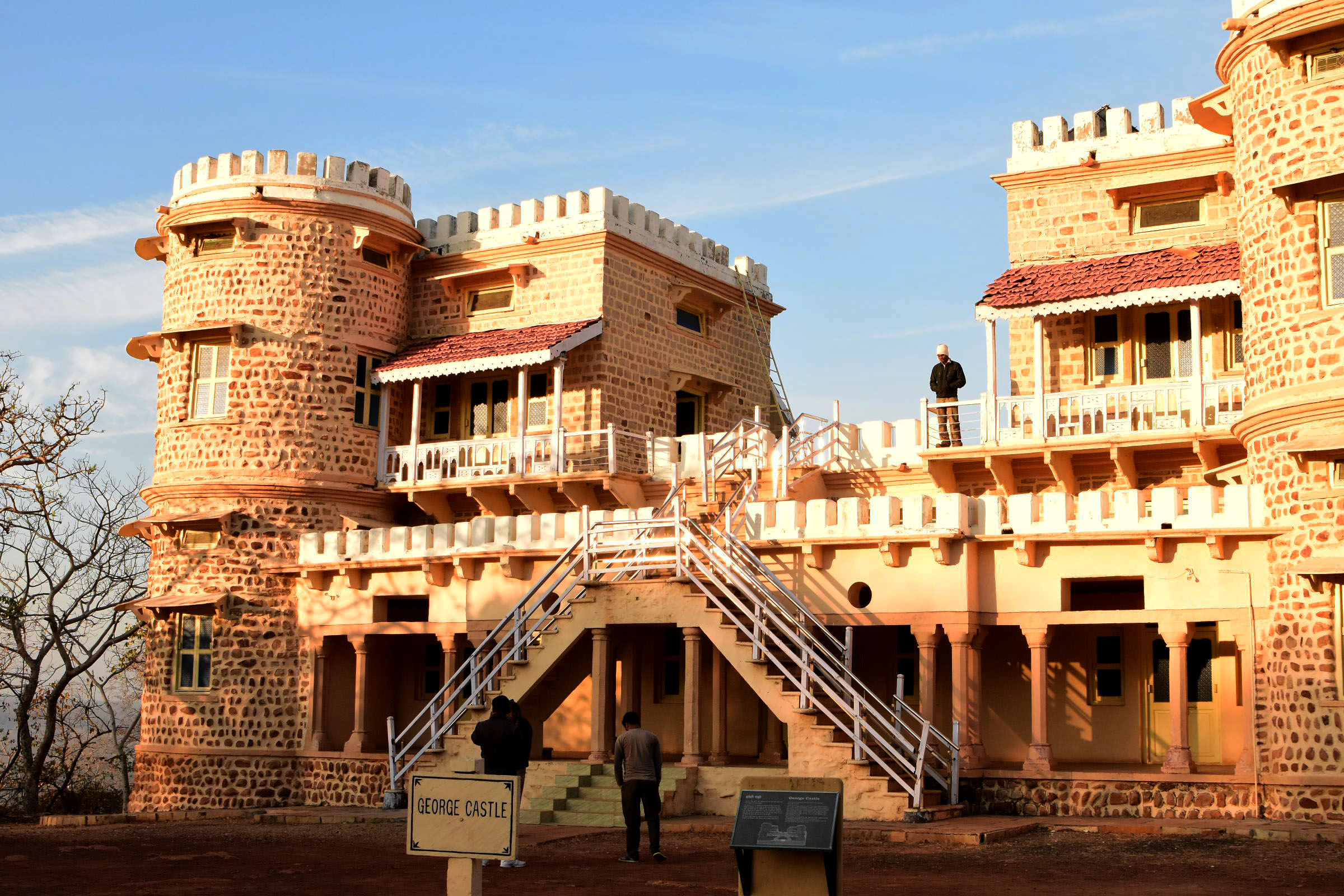
George Castle

George Castle was built in 1911 at an elevation of 484.0 m (1,587.9 ft). It was built for George V who had intended to stay there during his visit to India.

After the independence of India, the area suffered degradation. Agriculture and mining encroached on the former hunting grounds. Although the park was noticed in 1956, at 167 km2, as Shivpuri National Park and became the renamed Madhav National Park in 1959, degradation continued. The last of the resident wild tigers were seen in Madhav National Park in the late 1970s. In 1982, a plan to add a new part of the park parallel to the Chambal River was proposed. This expansion area included a corridor joining it to the original 167 km^{2} (64 sq mi).

In the 1990s, there was little effort to improve the conditions in the park. Illegal mining and questionable mining permits led to significant degradation in the park, so that in the 1990s conservationists took the matter to the Supreme Court of India and by 1998 received an injunction terminating mining in the area.

On 1 December 2024, the technical committee of the National Tiger Conservation Authority (NTCA) proposed to recognize Madhav National Park as a Tiger Reserve which will span 1,751 km^{2} (676 sq mi) featuring a core area of 375 km^{2} (145 sq mi) and a buffer area of 1,276 km^{2} (493 sq mi). Furthermore, the committee has also approved the release of one tiger and one tigress into the park.

== Geography ==
There are several small ponds in this national park, but the largest body of water is Sankhya Sagar, a reservoir, constructed for Madho Rao Scindia when it was still his hunting grounds. He also had constructed a second smaller reservoir by damming Manihar River, Madhav Sagar, known as Madhav Lake. A third reservoir was not included in the park.

Located in the ecoregion of Khathiar-Gir dry deciduous forests, this national park has a varied terrain of forested hills and flat grasslands around the reservoir and is thus rich in biodiversity. The average rainfall is 816 mm.

== See also ==
- Wildlife of India
