= Khaniyadhana =

- city
- Location in Madhya Pradesh, India Khaniyadhana (India)
- Coordinates: 25.01°N 78.07°E
- Country: India
- State: Madhya Pradesh
- District: Shivpuri

Area
  - Total: 5 km^{2} (1.9 sq mi)

Population (2011)
  - Total: 35,877
  - Density: 367/km^{2} (950/sq mi)

Languages
  - Official: Hindi
- Time zone: UTC+5:30 (IST)
- ISO 3166 code: IN-MP
- Vehicle registration: MP

Khaniyadhana is a tehsil and a Nagar Palika in Shivpuri district in the Indian state of Madhya Pradesh. It is known for its eight Jain temples.

== History ==
Before Indian independence in 1947, Khaniyadhana was the capital of a judev maharaj kalkhsingh of the same name - Khaniyadhana State. He also had a small brother named diwan mardan singh judev. In present time the family of maharaj khalk singh judev lives in khaniyadhana fort. And his small brother diwan mardan singh judev's family lives in haweli khaniyadhana known as [anand bhavan khaniyadhana].

== Dhapora Garhi ==
This place on Dhapora Garhi is considered to be the stronghold of Lodhi Rajput (landlord) ruler Raja Shrilal Lodhi Rajput, Shri Lal Lodhi Rajput's son Shri Badri Prasad Lodhi is considered to be the stronghold, now daughter-in-law Anil-Abhilasha Lodhi, son of Badri Prasad Lodhi, is the District Panchayat Sadas. Ward Number-19. Prasad ji's younger brother Prabendra Lodhi Rajput is illuminating the name of his father's name as well as his village Dhapora. Prabendra Rajput is giving free education to poor students by running an NGO named Avantika in Gwalior. Also preparing for civil services. Running a campaign against corruption and drug addiction campaign.

== Geography ==
It is located in Shivpuri District at 25º01' N, 78º07' E. Which is 110 km away from Shivpuri and 85 km away from Jhansi(UP). Basically this is situated on highland.

== Demographics ==
As of 2001 India census, Khaniyadhana had a population of 35,595. Males constitute 52% of the population and females 48%. Khaniyadhana has an average literacy rate of 78%, male literacy is 88%, and female literacy is 64%. In Khaniyadhana, 19% of the population is under 6 years of age.

== Transport ==
Khaniyadhana is connected with roads, and is connected by private bus services to all nearest major cities.

- The nearest airport is in Gwalior.
- The nearest railway station is basai which is situated 40 km away from khaniyadhana.
