= Shivpuri district =

- District of Madhya Pradesh
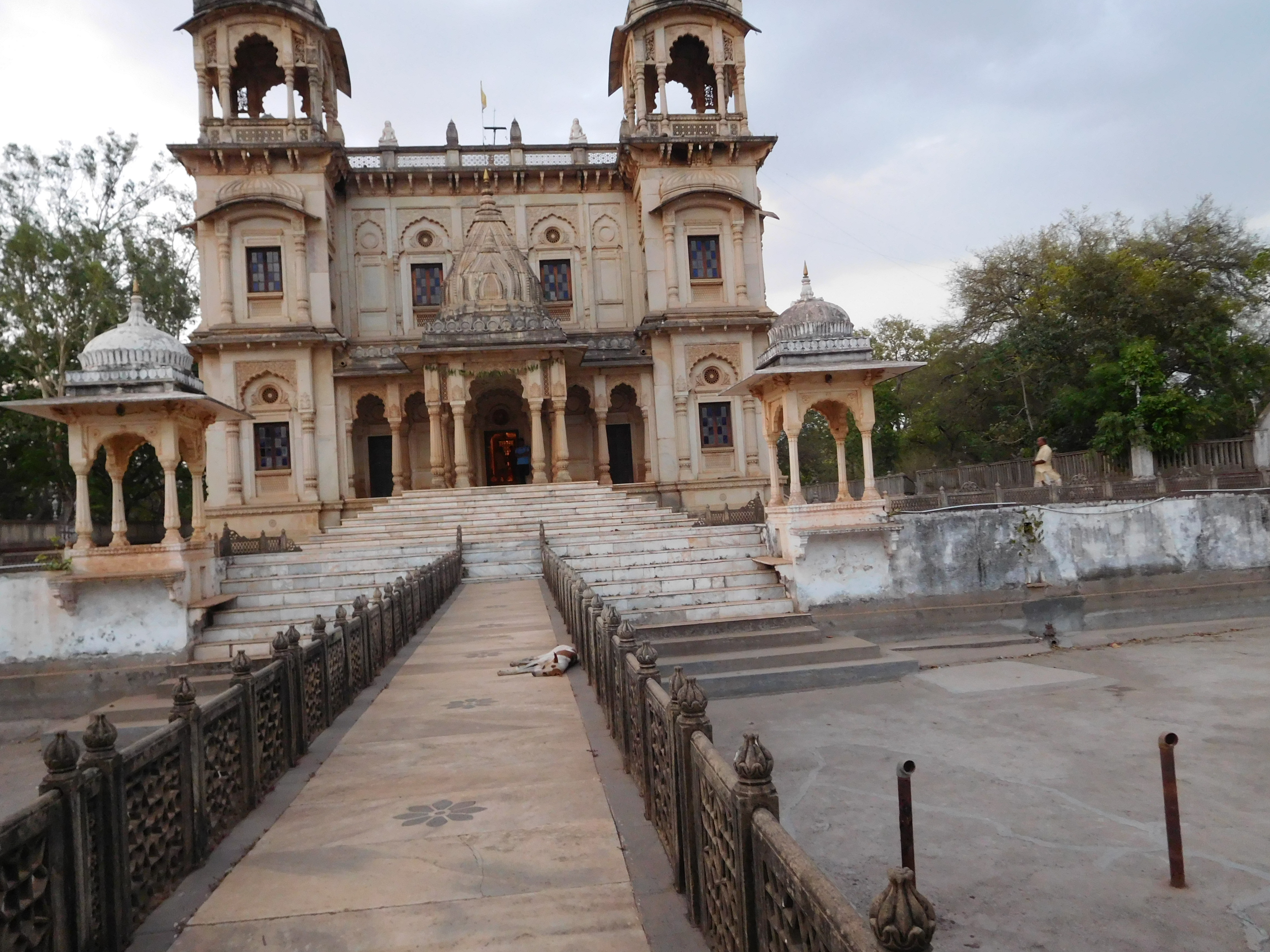
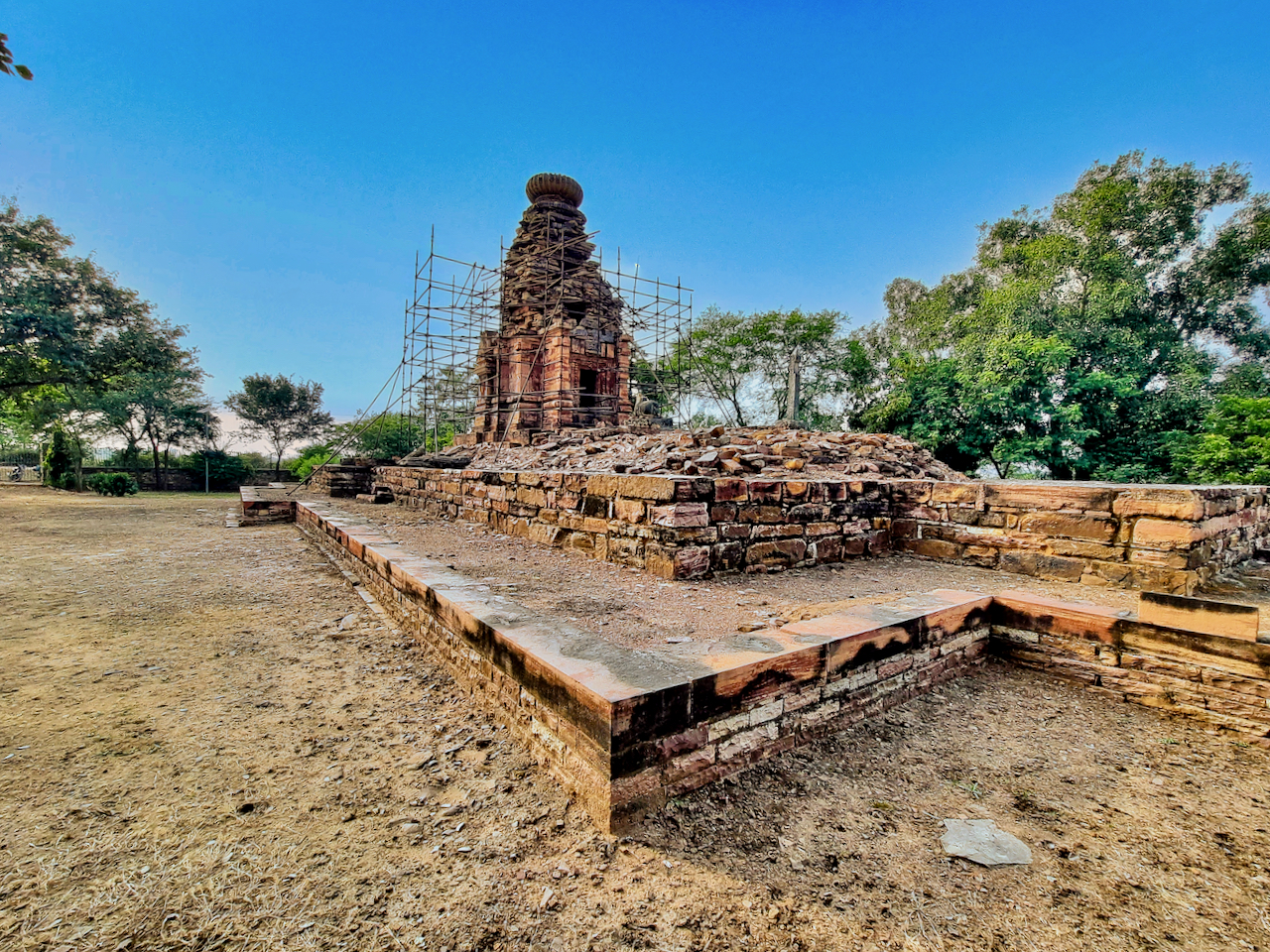
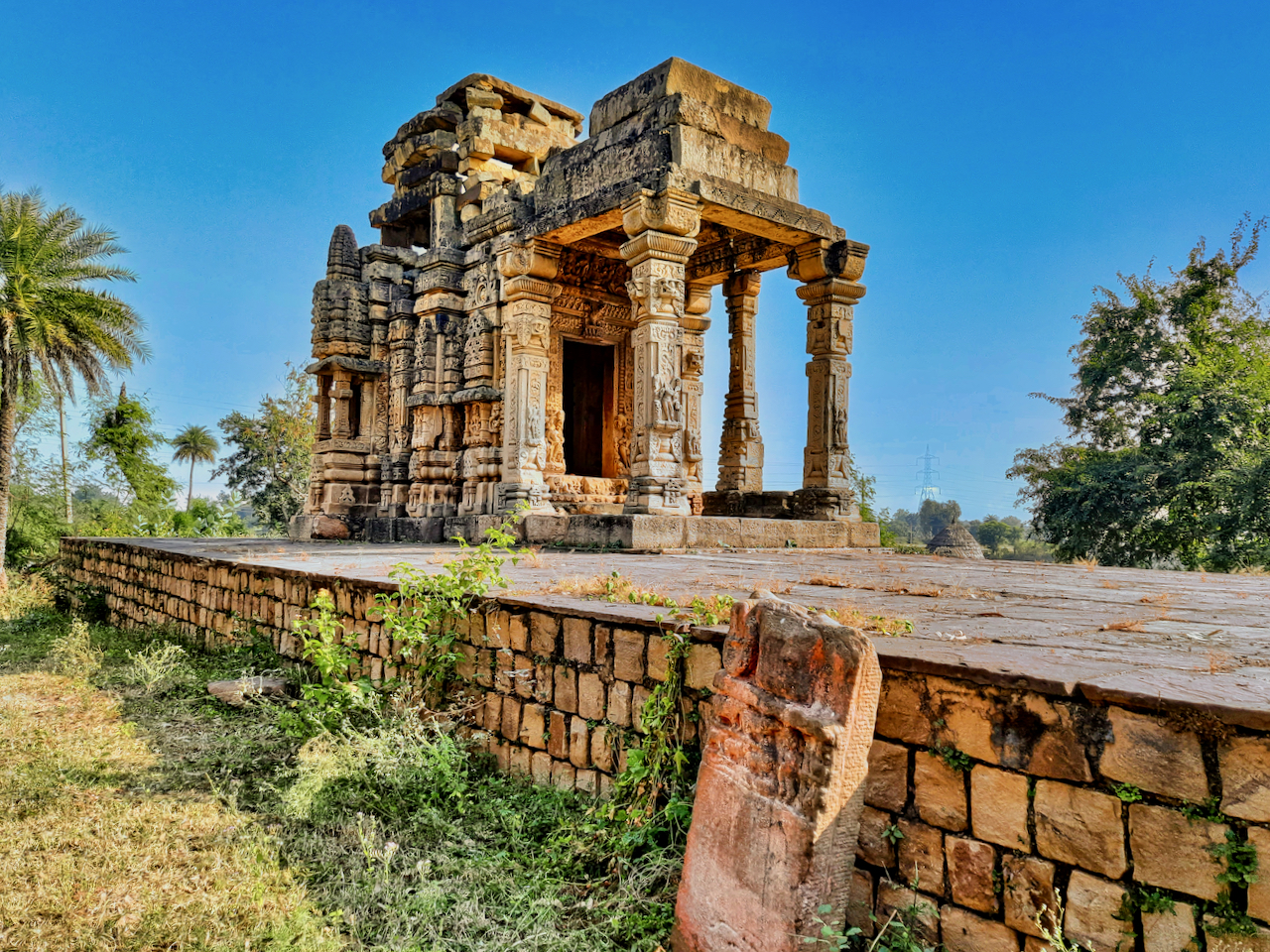
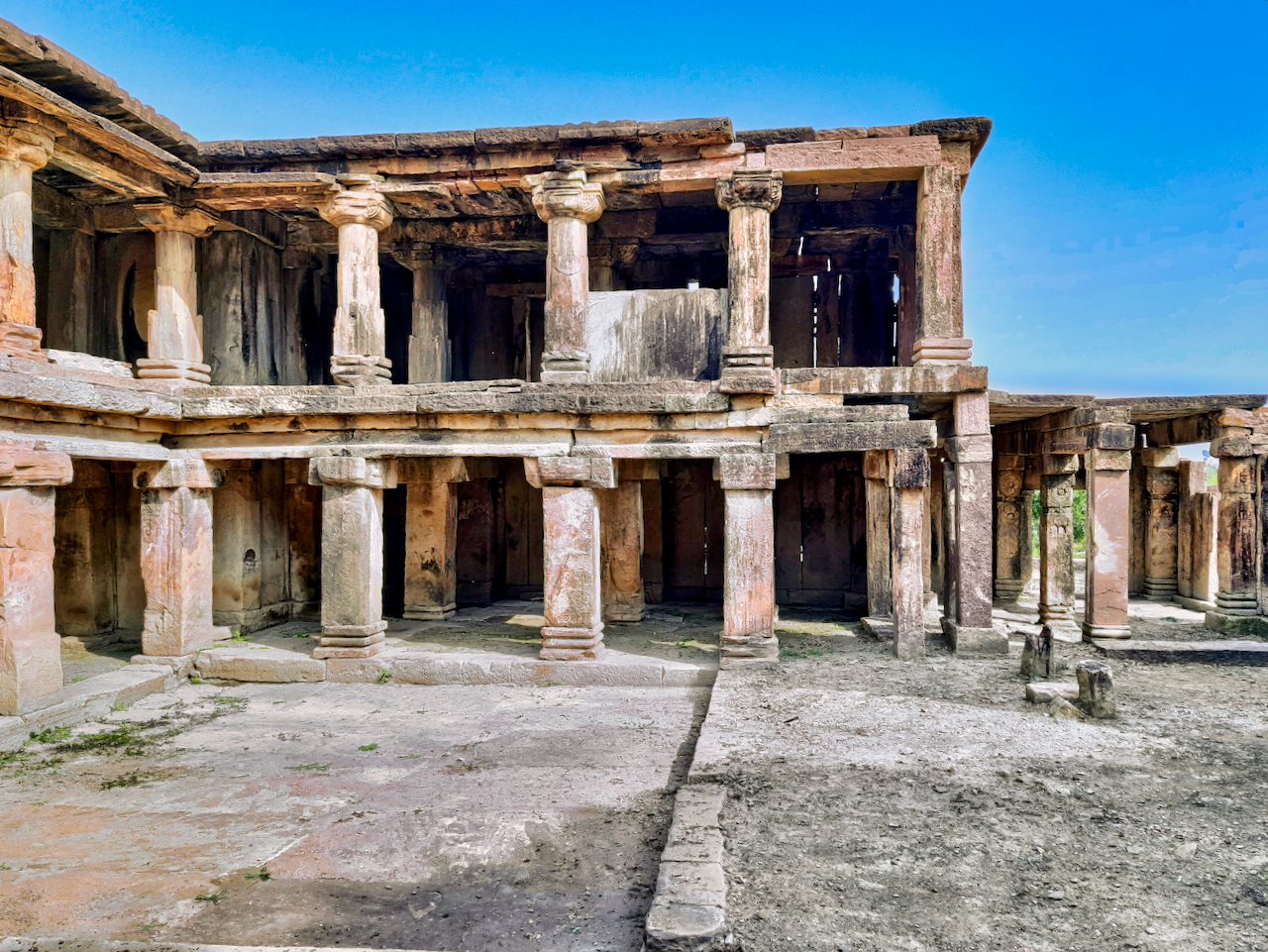
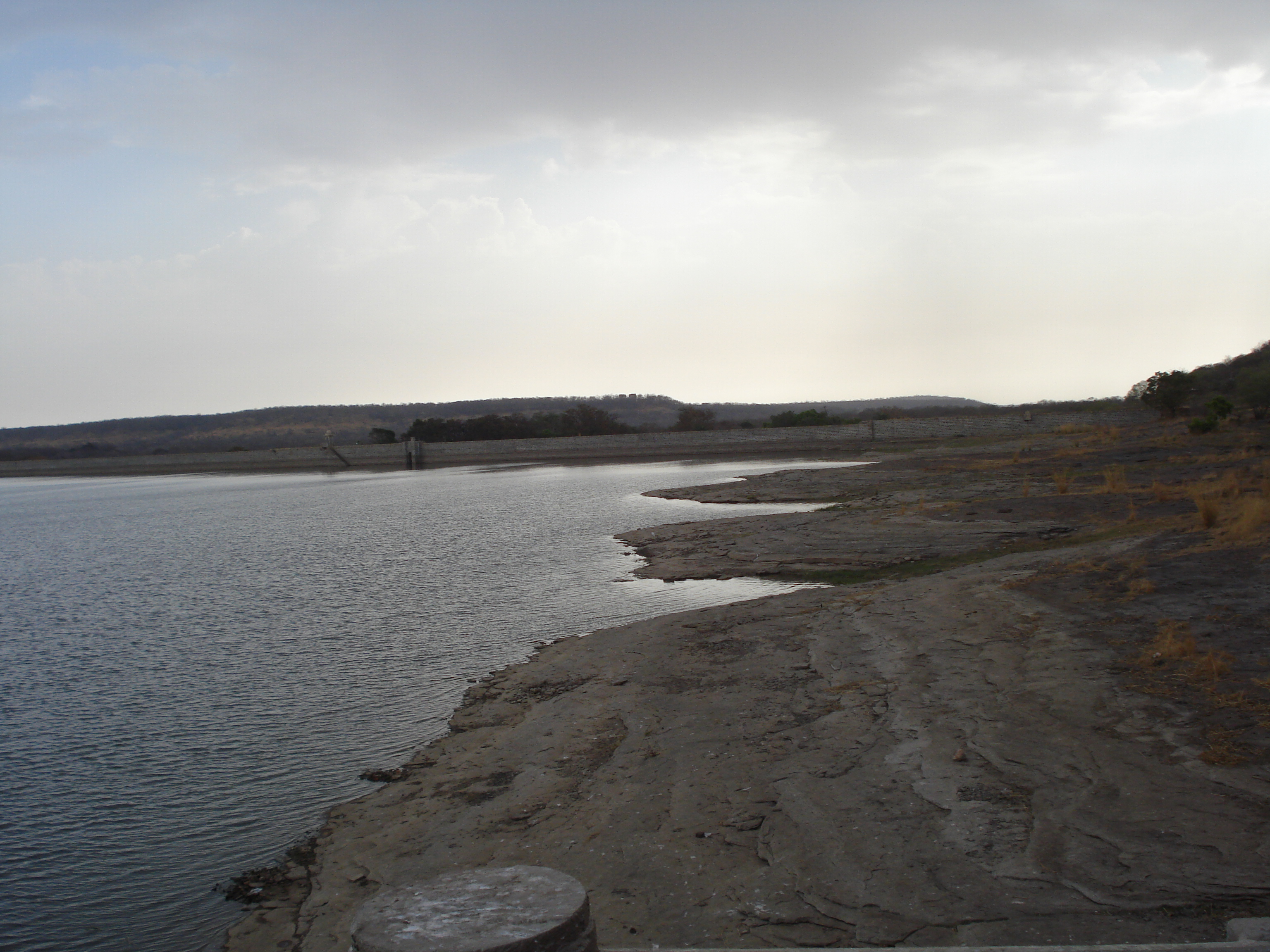
- Clockwise from top-left: Chhatri in Shivpuri, Mahua Nagara Mandir, temples in Terahi, Madhav National Park, Surya Mandir, Sesai

- Location of Shivpuri district in Madhya Pradesh
- Country: India
- State: Madhya Pradesh
- Division: Gwalior
- Headquarters: Shivpuri
- Tehsils: 10

Area
  - Total: 10,666 km^{2} (4,118 sq mi)

Population (2011)
  - Total: 1,726,050
  - Density: 161.83/km^{2} (419.13/sq mi)

Demographics
  - Literacy: 63.73 per cent
  - Sex ratio: 877 females over 1000 males
- Time zone: UTC+05:30 (IST)
- Major highways: NH46 and NH25
- Average annual precipitation: July to September mm
- Website: shivpuri.nic.in

Shivpuri district (Hindi pronunciation: [ʃɪʋpʊɾiː]) is a district of Madhya Pradesh state of India. The town of Shivpuri is the district headquarters. National Highway 3 (NH-3) runs through the district.

== History ==
Most of present-day Shivpuri District formed Narwar District of the erstwhile princely state of Gwalior, with Shivpuri as administrative headquarters of the district. After India's independence in 1947, the princely states acceded to the Government of India, and Shivpuri District acquired its present boundaries with the addition of the small princely state of Khaniadhana in the southeast of the district, portions of Datia state in the northeast, and most of Pauri estate in the northwest. Shivpuri District became part of the new state of Madhya Bharat, which was merged into Madhya Pradesh in 1956.

== Geography ==
The district is bounded on the south by Ashoknagar and Guna districts, on the north by Morena, Gwalior and Datia districts, on the east by Jhansi district of Uttar Pradesh and on the west by Kota district of Rajasthan.

The district sits on the Malwa Plateau of the Deccan Traps with many small hill tops originally covered with deciduous forests. Other than Shivpuri, the major towns are Karera and Akoda (24°52′07″N 77°11′22″E).

The large bodies of water in the district are the Madikheda Reservoir and the Mohini Pickup Reservoir near Narwar. The principle river is the Sind River which arises in southern Badarwas Tehsil, flows north-northeastwards through the central and northeastern parts of the district and enters the Yamuna at Kanjausa. The district drainage is all within the large Yamuna basin, but falls into four sub-basins drained respectively by tributaries of (1) the Parwati River (Parvati) which flows west to east and forms part of the northern boundary of the district being dammed for the Kaketo Reservoir and Harsi Reservoir and flowing into the Sind just upstream of the mouth of the Mahuar; (2) the Kuno River which flows from southeast to northwest into the Chambal and forms part of the western boundary of the district; (3) the Betwa River which flows from southwest to northeast and forms part of the eastern boundary of the district; and (4) the Mahuar River itself (with its main tributary the Paroch Nadi) which arises in Pichor Tehsil, flows from south to north, enters Karera Tehsil at the village of Bardi, crosses Narwar Tehsil and enters the Sind just northeast (downstream) of Senhra Khurd.

== Administrative divisions ==
Shivpuri District is divided into eight tehsils, and further subdivided into 614 panchayats and 1459 villages (of which 1409 are revenue villages, 133 are deserted and 15 are forest villages).

- Shivpuri Tehsil
- Pohari Tehsil
- Kolaras Tehsil
- Badarwas Tehsil
- Karera Tehsil
- Narwar Tehsil
- Pichore Tehsil
- Khaniyadana Tehsil
- Bairad Tehsil
- Rannod Tehsil

== Economy ==
In 2006 the Ministry of Panchayati Raj named Shivpuri one of the country's 250 most backward districts (out of a total of 640). It is one of the 24 districts in Madhya Pradesh currently receiving funds from the Backward Regions Grant Fund Programme (BRGF).

== Demographics ==
Historical population
Year	Pop.	±% p.a.
1901	370,430	—
1911	415,279	+1.15%
1921	376,315	−0.98%
1931	402,032	+0.66%
1941	446,215	+1.05%
1951	462,864	+0.37%
1961	542,978	+1.61%
1971	658,949	+1.95%
1981	843,110	+2.50%
1991	1,103,790	+2.73%
2001	1,406,031	+2.45%
2011	1,726,050	+2.07%

Religions in Shivpuri district (2011)
Religion	Percent
Hinduism	95.52%
Islam	2.97%
Jainism	0.71%
Sikhism	0.41%
Other or not stated	0.38%

According to the 2011 census Shivpuri district has a population of 1,726,050, roughly equal to the nation of The Gambia or the US state of Nebraska. This gives it a ranking of 280th in India (out of a total of 640). The district has a population density of 168 inhabitants per square kilometre (440/sq mi). Its population growth rate over the decade 2001-2011 was 22.74%. Shivpuri has a sex ratio of 877 females for every 1000 males, and a literacy rate of 63.73%. 17.12% of the population live in urban areas. Scheduled Castes and Tribes make up 18.63% and 13.20% of the population respectively.

Languages of Shivpuri district (2011)
1. Hindi (96.5%)
2. Bundeli (2.33%)
3. Others (1.15%)

At the time of the 2011 Census of India, 96.52% of the population in the district spoke Hindi and 2.33% Bundeli as their first language.

== Places ==
=== Narwar ===
Narwar is a town of historical importance just east of the Sind River, situated 41 km north of the town of Shivpuri. Narwar is known for its medieval fortress, Narwar Fort, and for rice cultivation.

=== Madhav Chauk ===
Madhav Chauk is a main market of town in Shivpuri. All marketing facilities are available here.

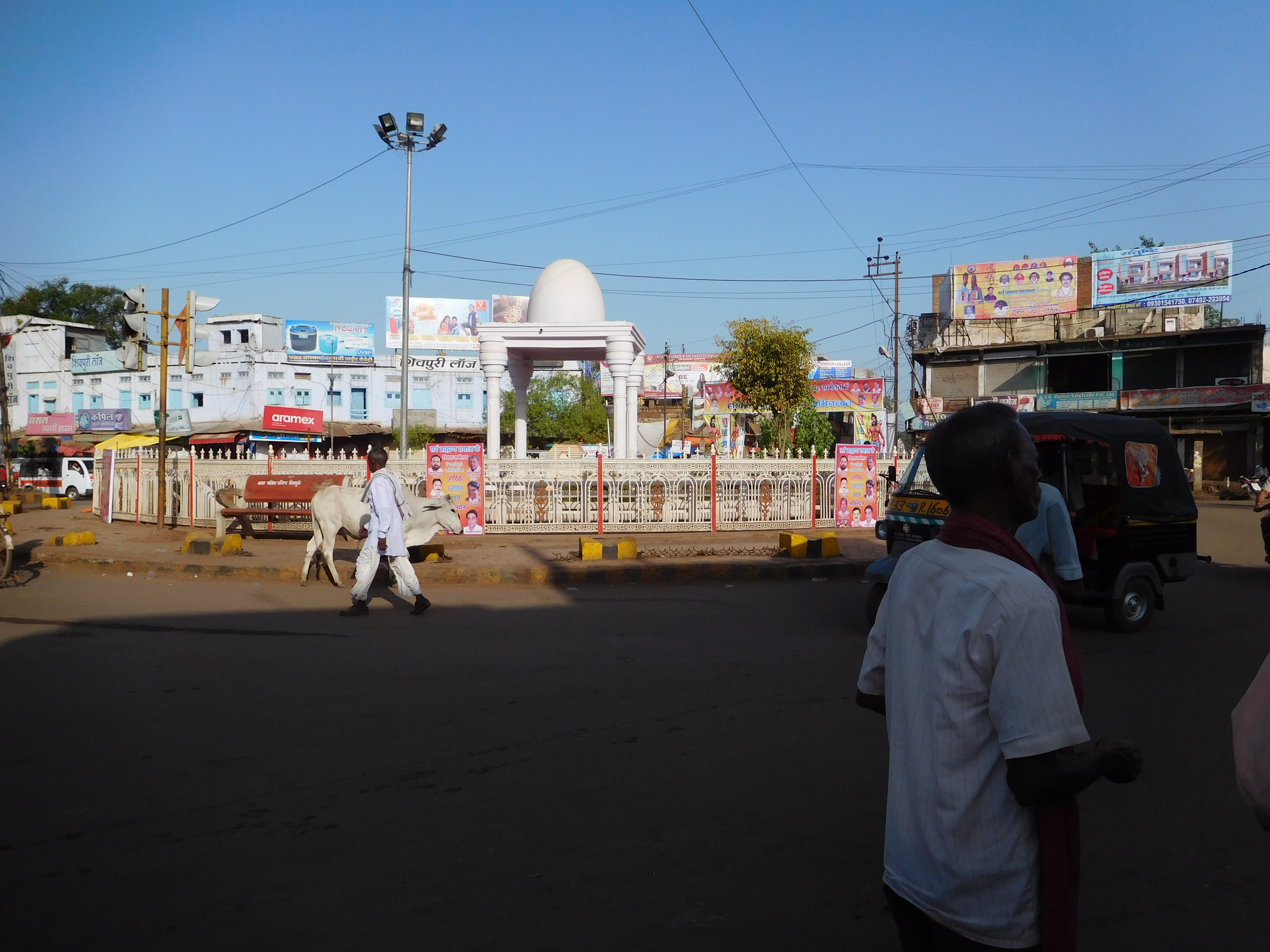
Madhav Chauk

=== Madhav National Park ===
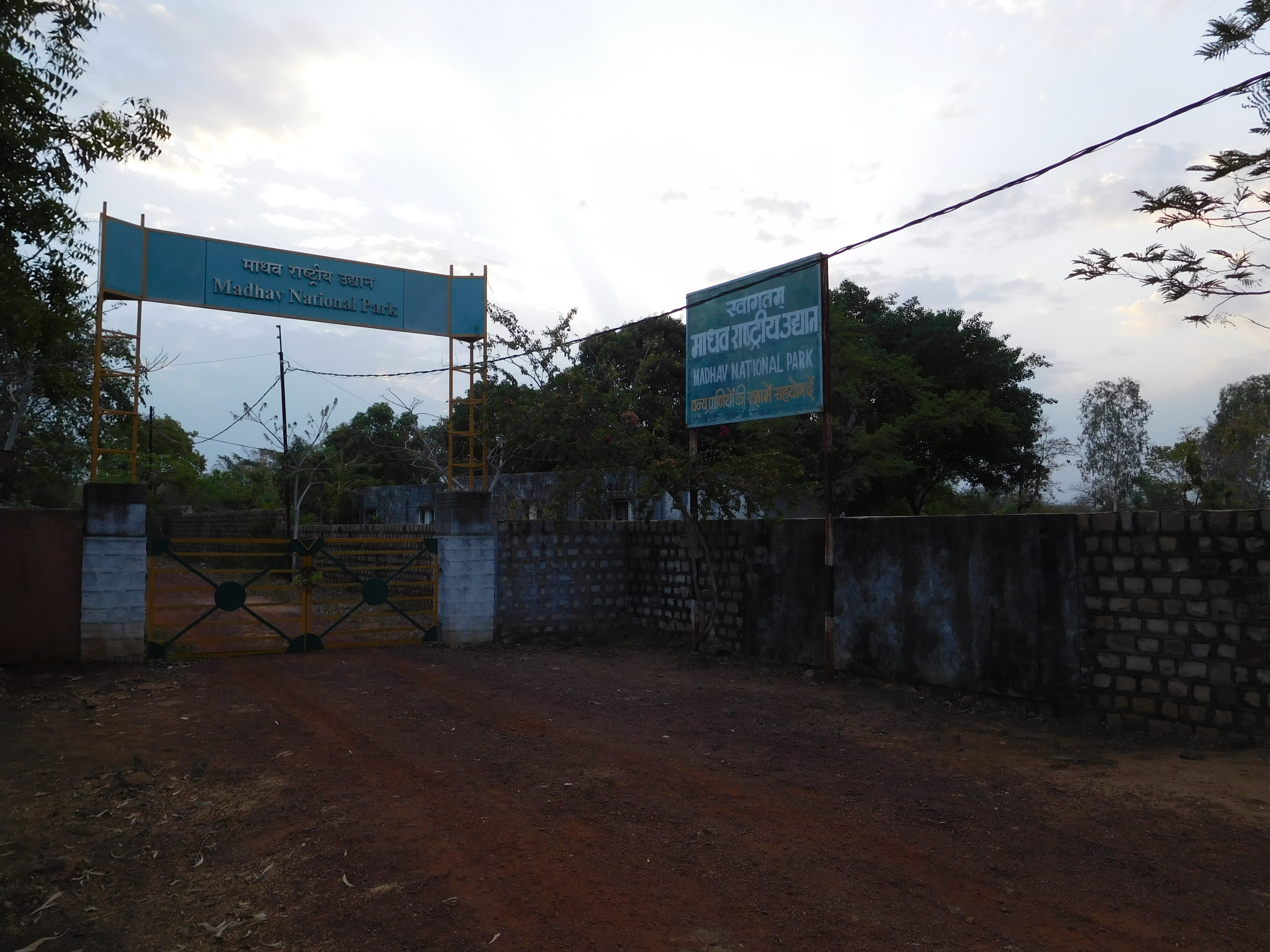
Madhav National Park

Madhav National Park is located between Agra-Mumbai and Jhansi-Shivpuri road. Its area is 157.58 square kilometers. The park is open to visitors throughout the year. Blackbuck, Indian gazelle and chital Knil large number of cows, sambar, Chausinga, black buck, sloth bears, leopards and other inhabitants of the park. The park has a varied terrain of forested hills and flat grasslands around the lake. It is rich in biodiversity. Sakhya Sagar and Madhav Sagar lakes, created on Manier River in 1918, are two important biodiversity support systems in the national park. The Sailing Club situated on Sakhya Sagar at the entrance of the National park is a place of scenic beauty.

=== Tourist Village ===
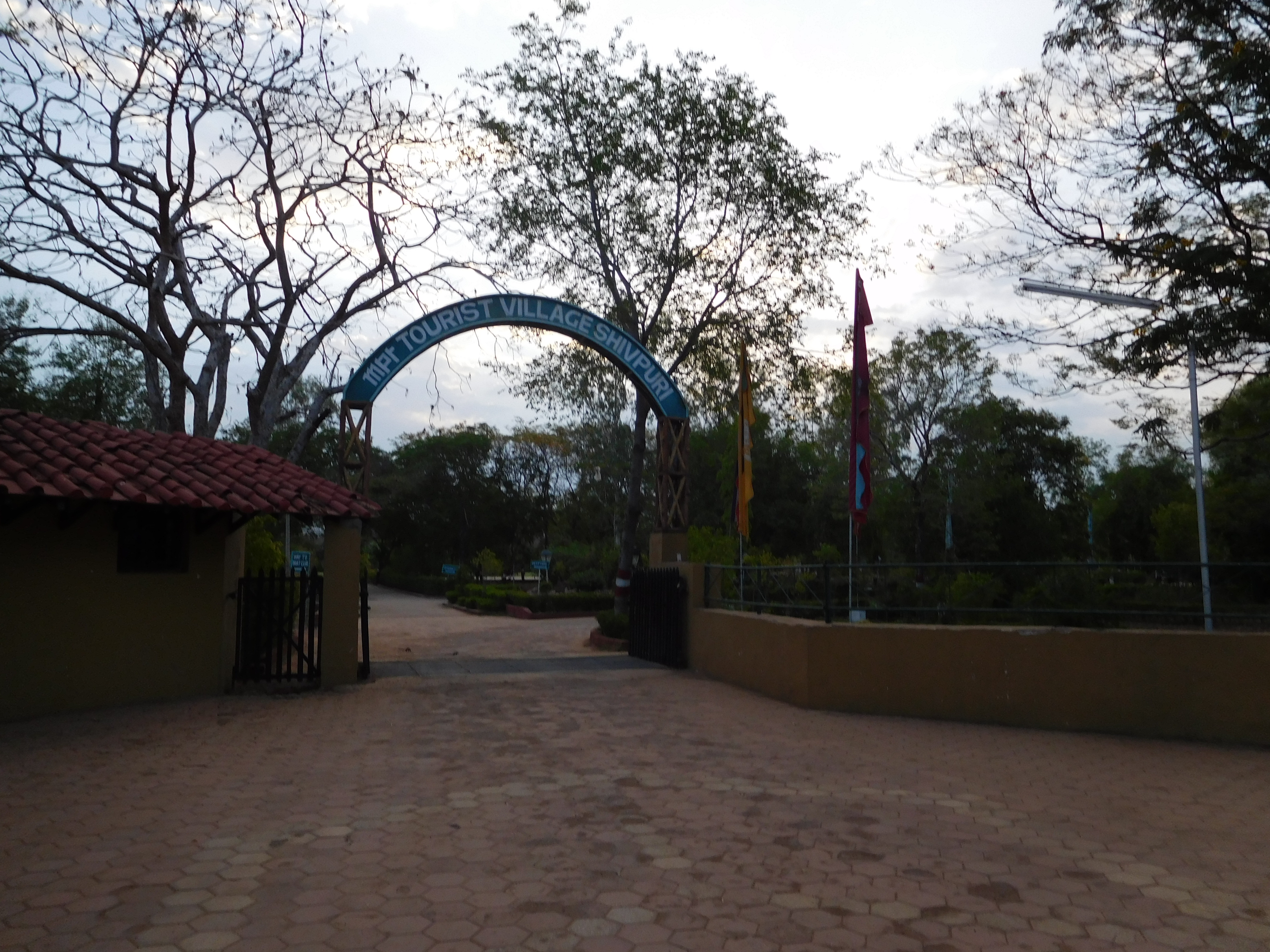
Tourist Village Shivpuri

Shivpuri Tourism Center. Shivpuri is the center of attraction for tourists throughout the year, but Shivpuri attracts tourists after the first rain. Tourist Village is located here to stay for tourist near Picnic Spot Bhadaiya Kund.

==== Chhatari ====
There are many Scindia Chatri (memorials) of royals of Scindia Rajvansh made of ornate marble.

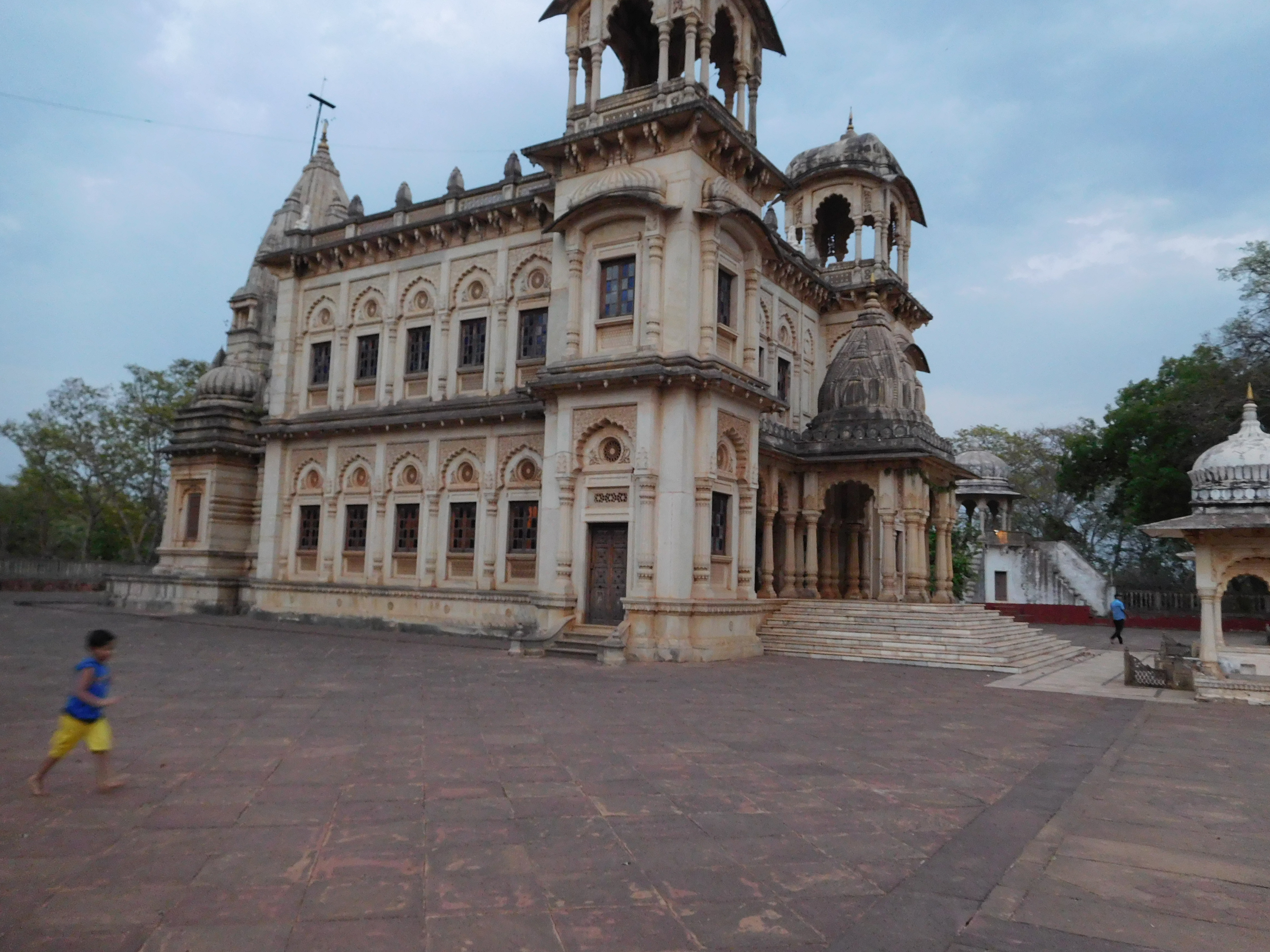
Chhatari (Shivpuri) a memorials

Its campus is on Chhatari Road which leads from Do Battai Chauraha to Bhadaiya Kund. There is a memorial of dowager queen Maharani Sakhya Raje Scindia at the entrance of the campus, in a fusion of Hindu and Islamic architectural styles, with their shikhara type spires and Maratha Rajput and Mughal pavilions. A tank is created in front of this memorial. The memorial of Madhav Rav Scindhia is built across the tank facing towards Maharani Sakhya Raje Scindhia.

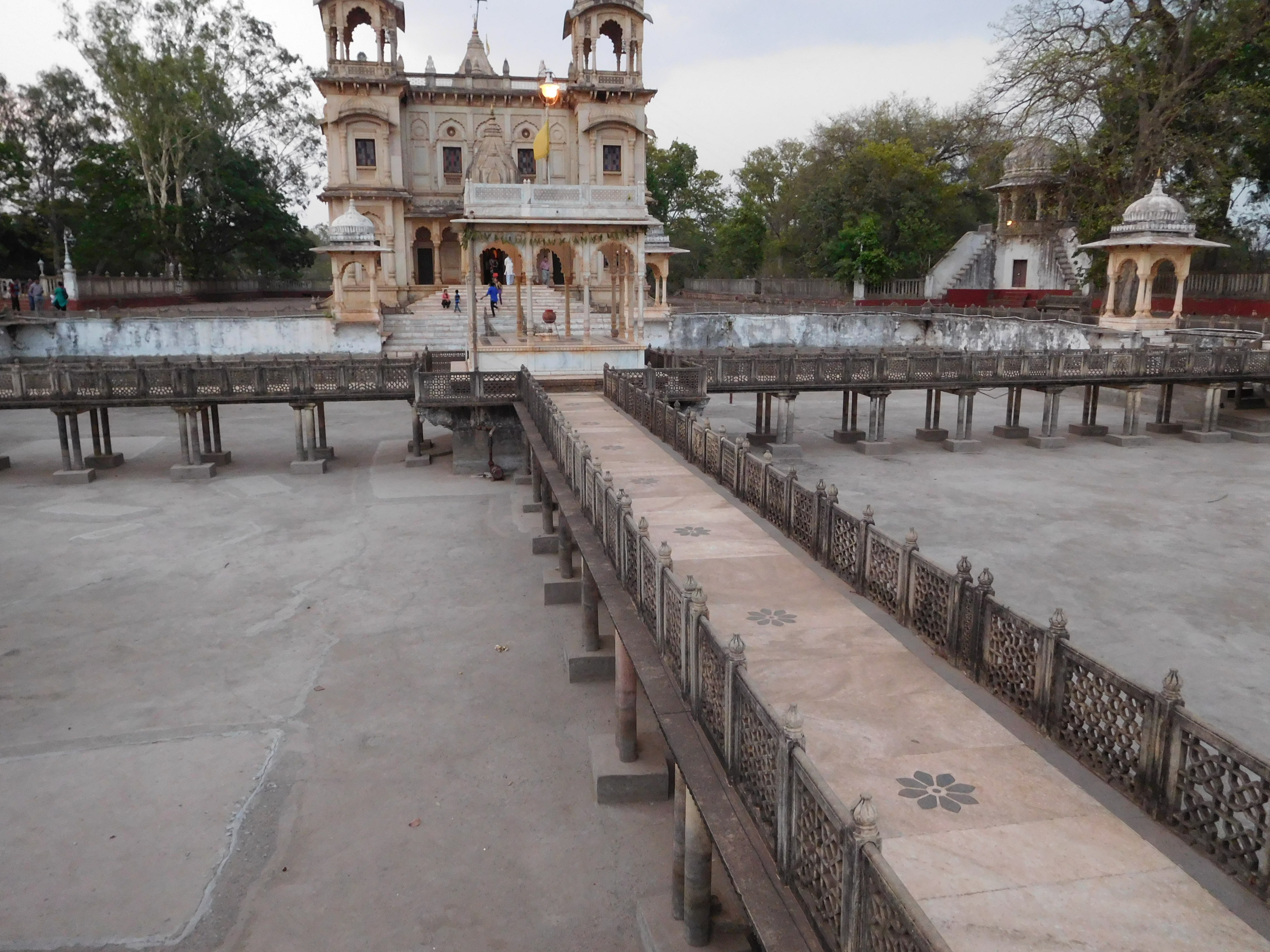
Chhatari (Tank)

One side of the tank a temple is established of Lord Ram with Seeta, Lakshman and other side a temple is established of Radha- Krishna. All memorials and temples are built by Scindhia Maharaja Princes of Gwalior.

Management of Chhatari is under control of a ScindiaTrust.

== Villages ==
- Dinara
- Thakurpura

== Notable people ==
- Madhavrao Scindia, Indian politician and Maharaja of Scindia Rajvansh Gwalior State.
- Yashodhara Raje Scindia, member of the legislative assembly from Shivpuri.

== Gallery ==
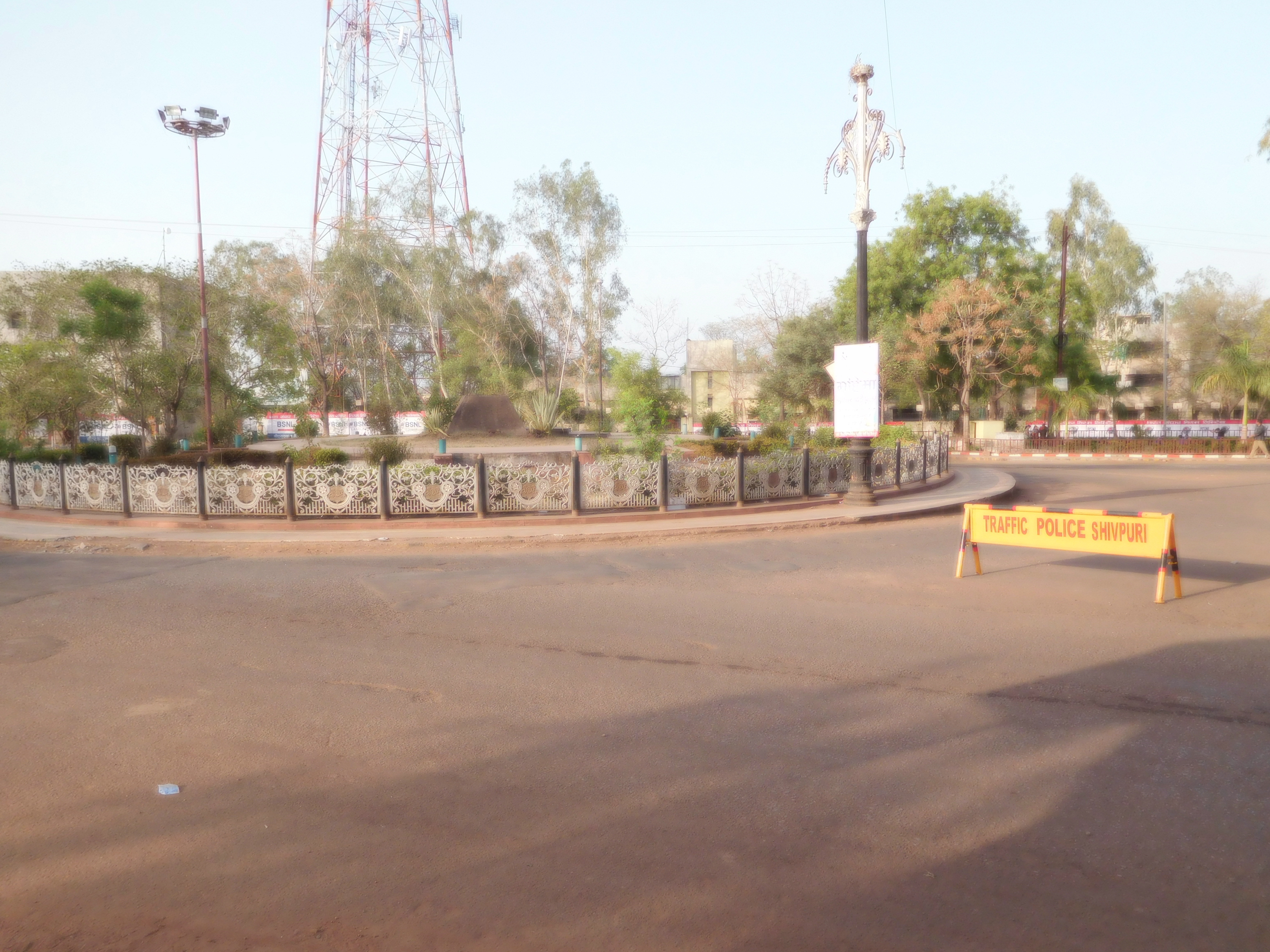
Do Batti Chauraha, Shivpuri

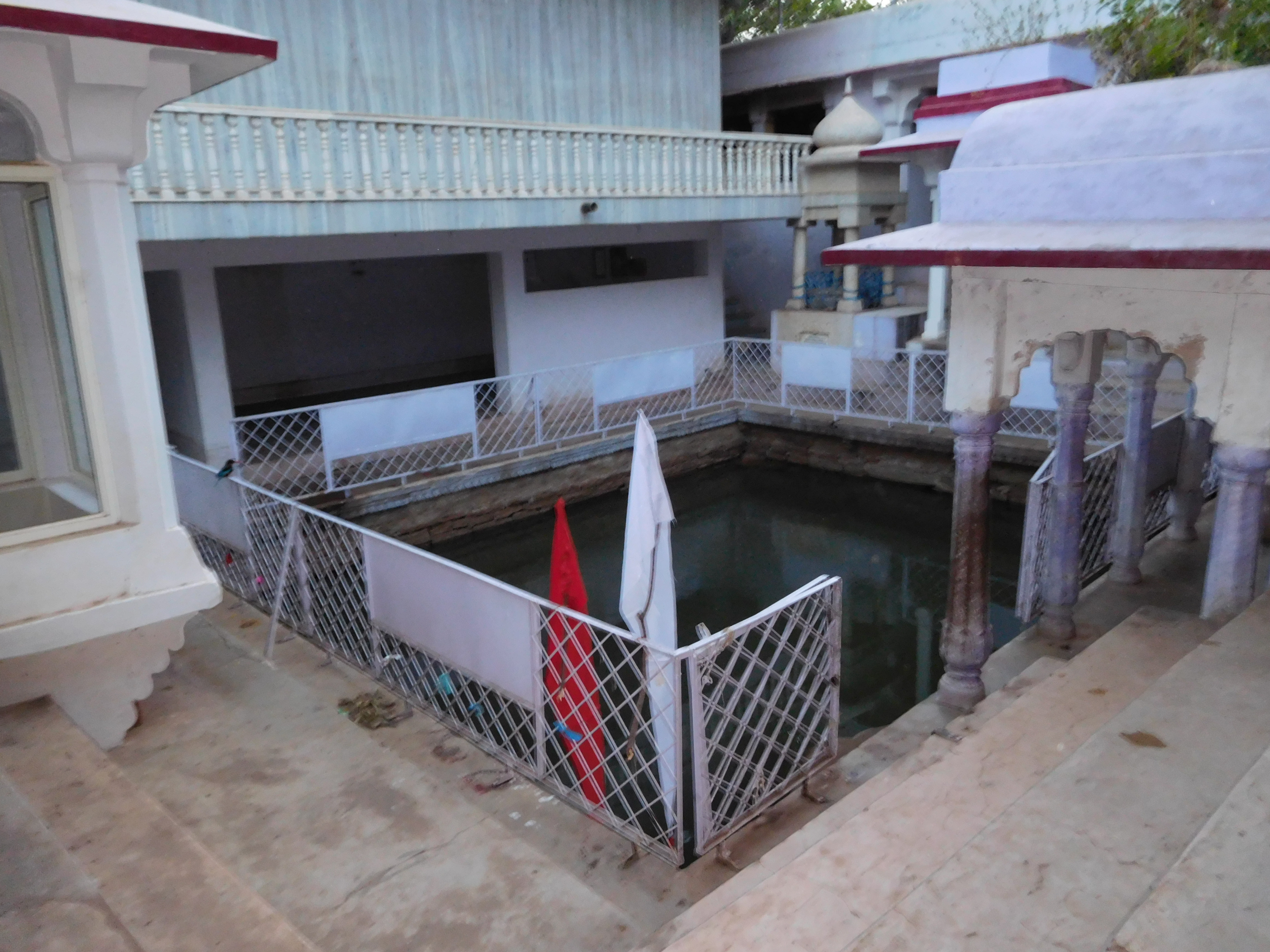
Ban Ganga Dham Shivpuri

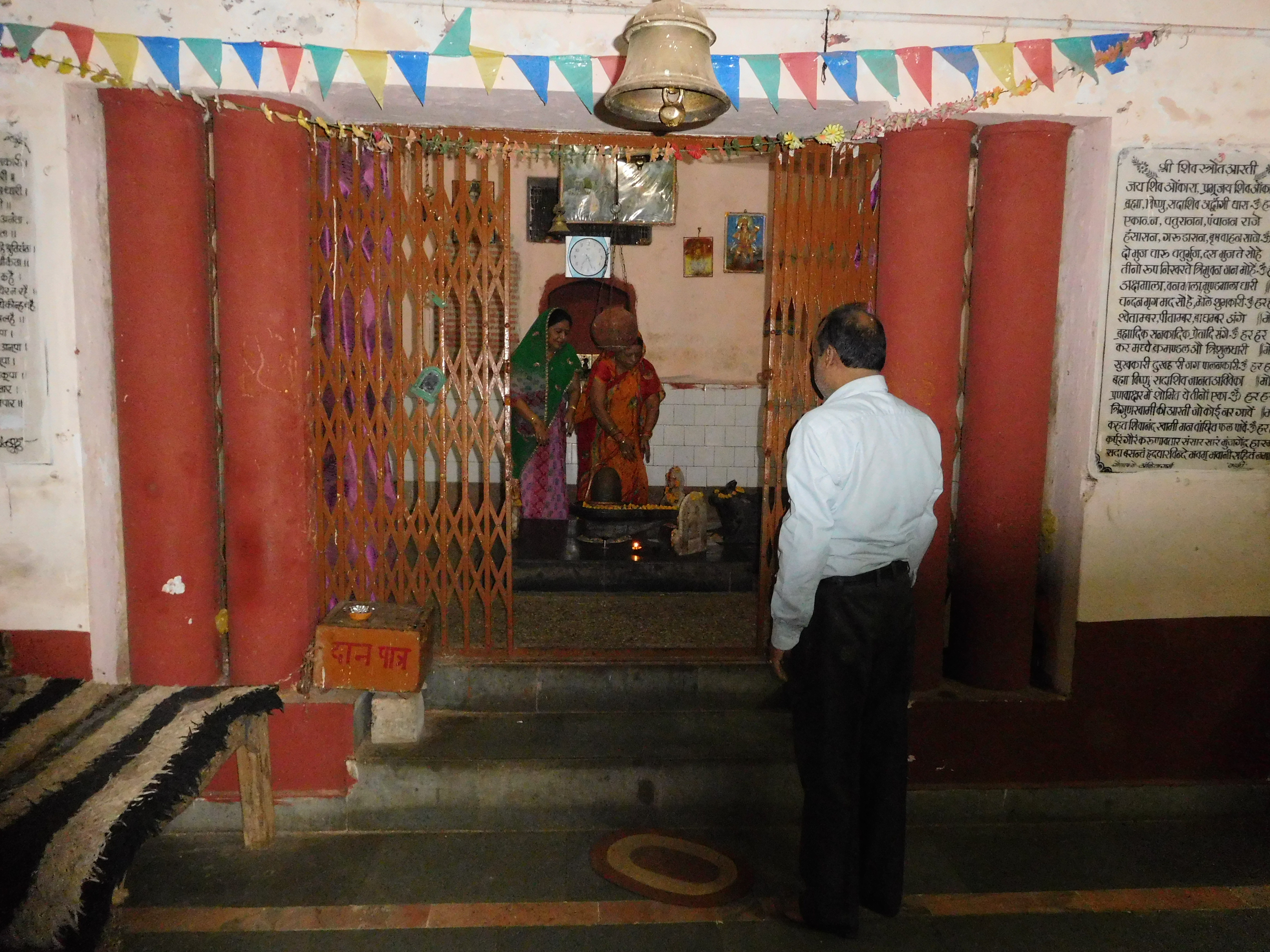
Mohineshwar Dham Mandir, Shivpuri

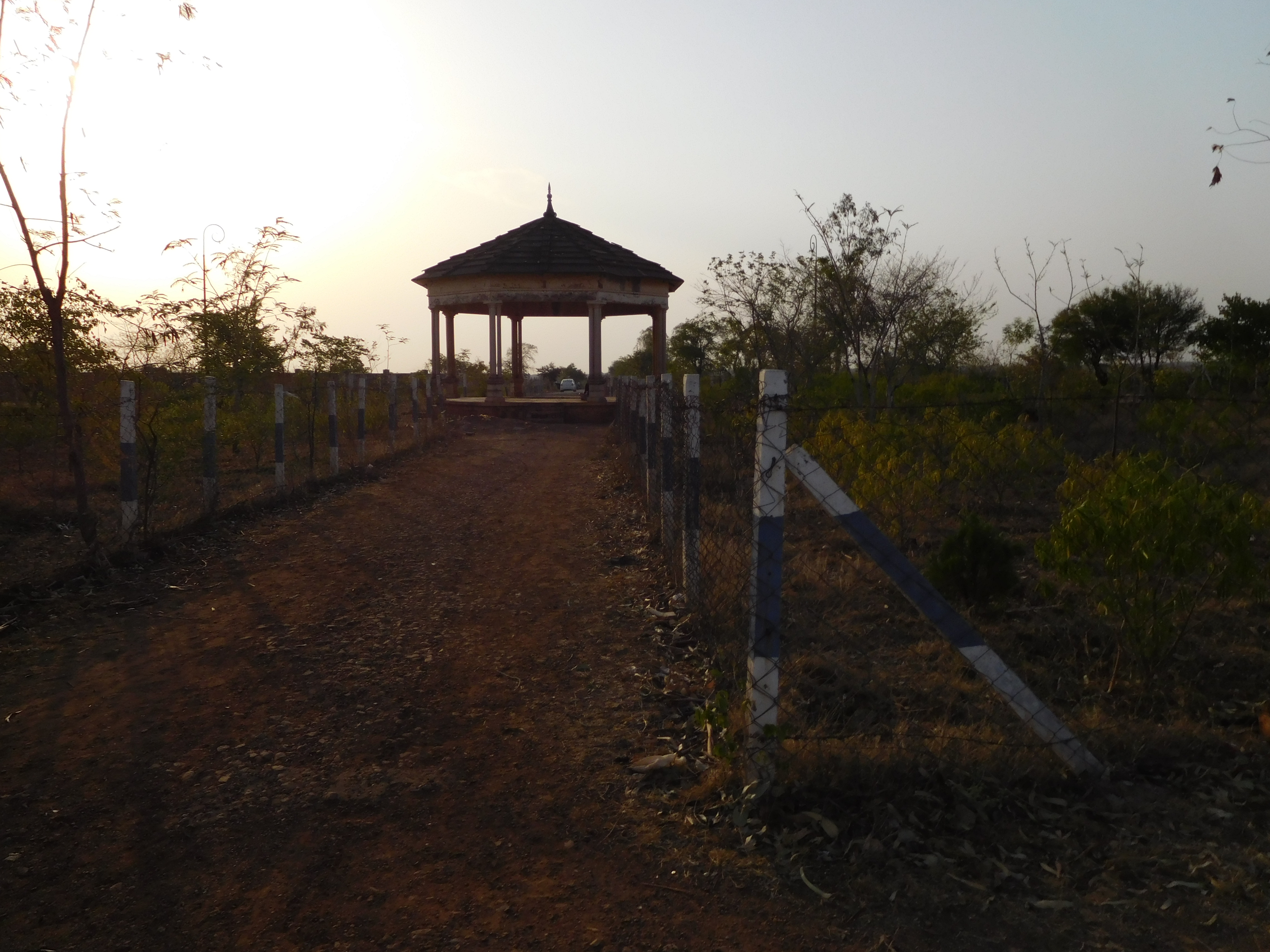
Nagada Ghar

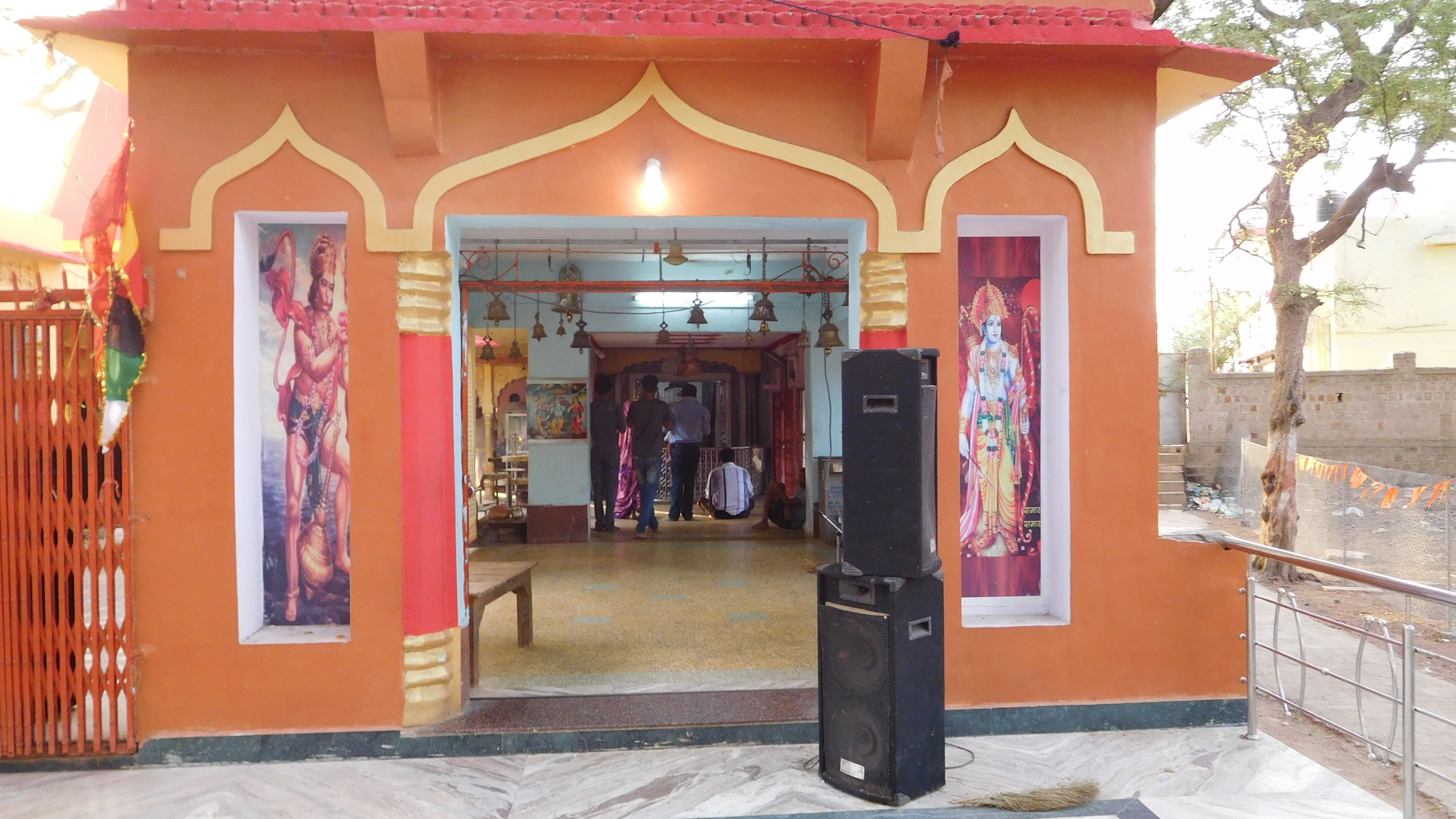
Chintaharan Mandir

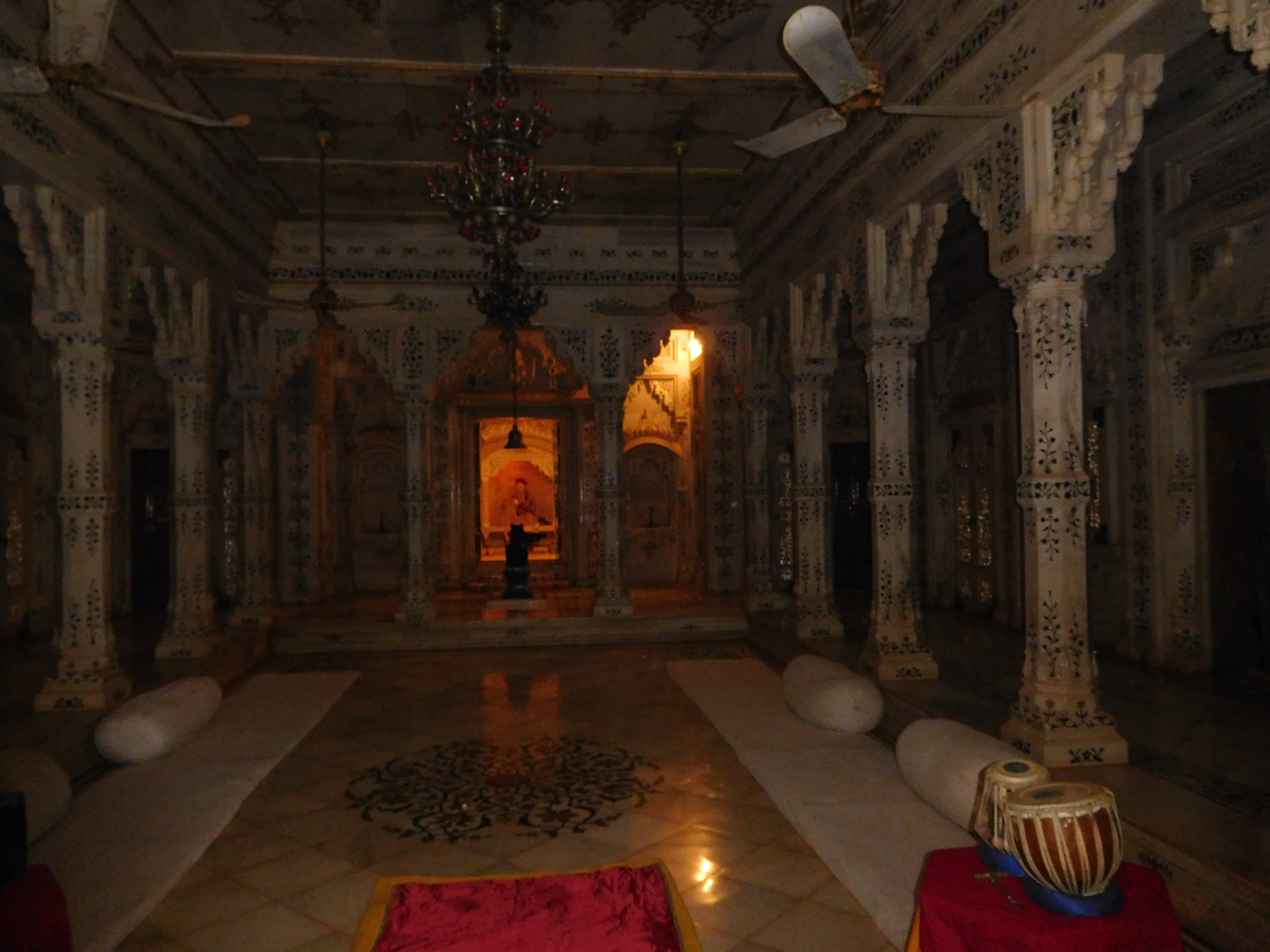
Chhatari (interior)

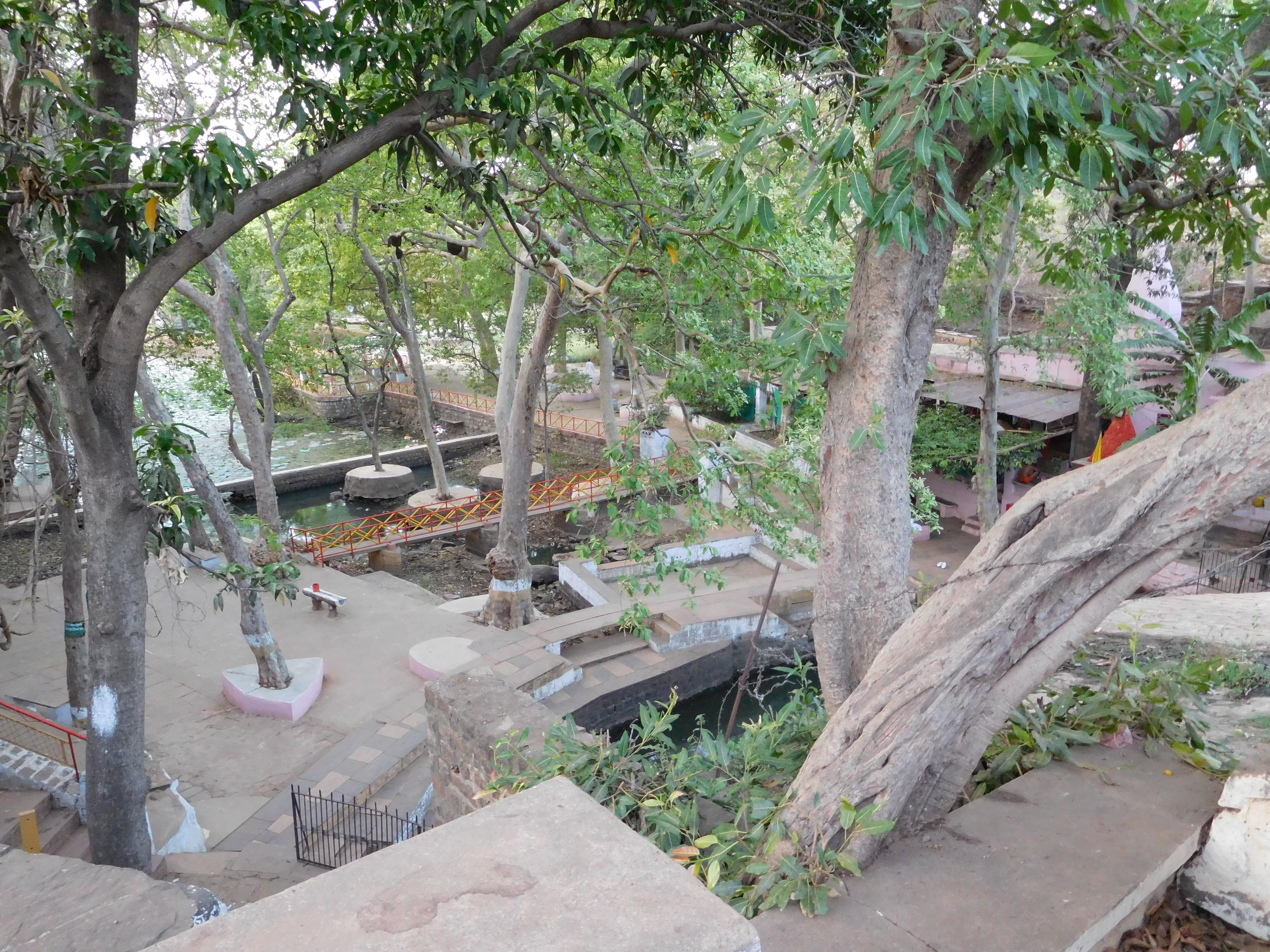
Bhadaiya Kund, Shivpuri

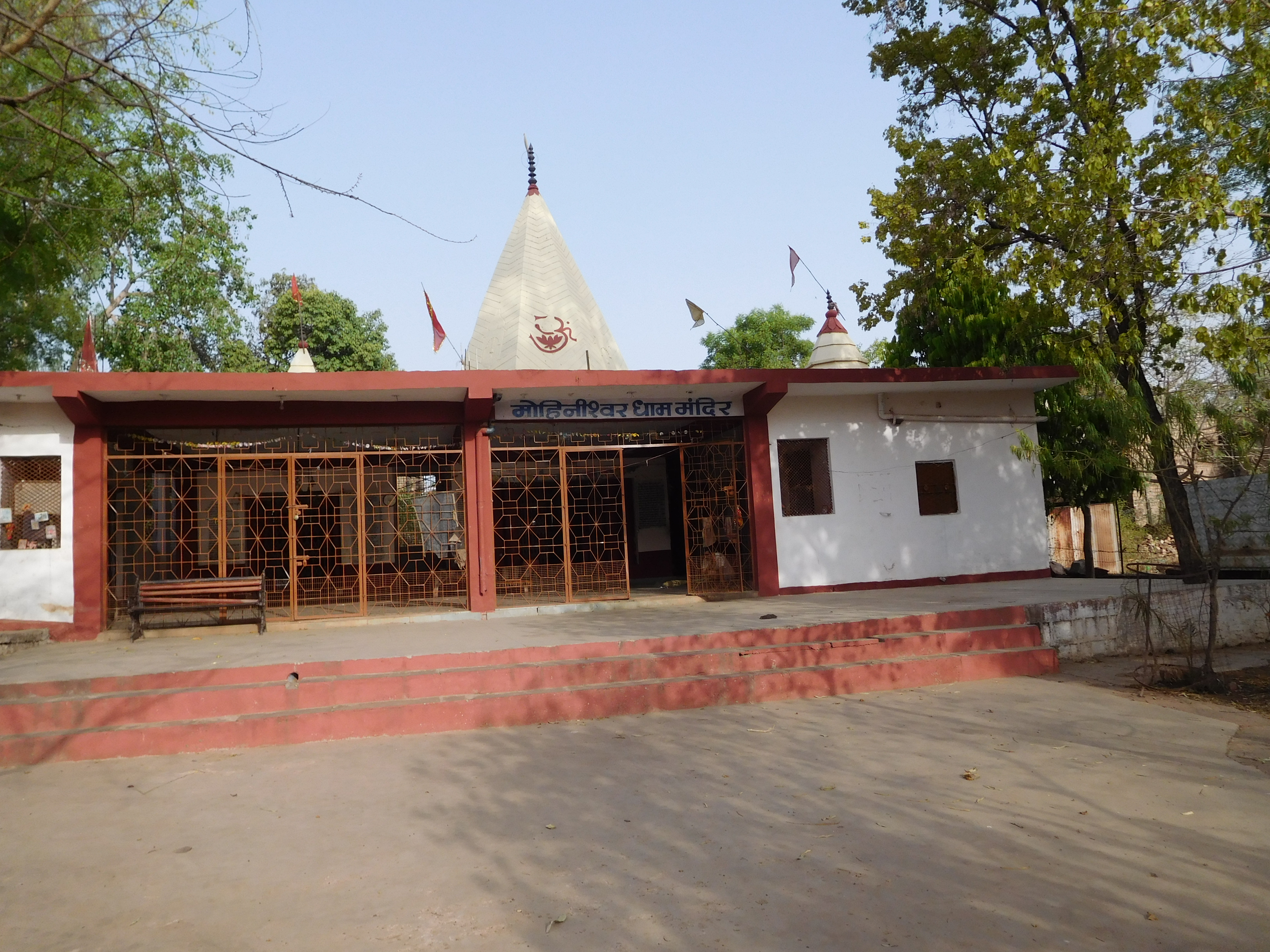
Mohineshwar Dham Mandir

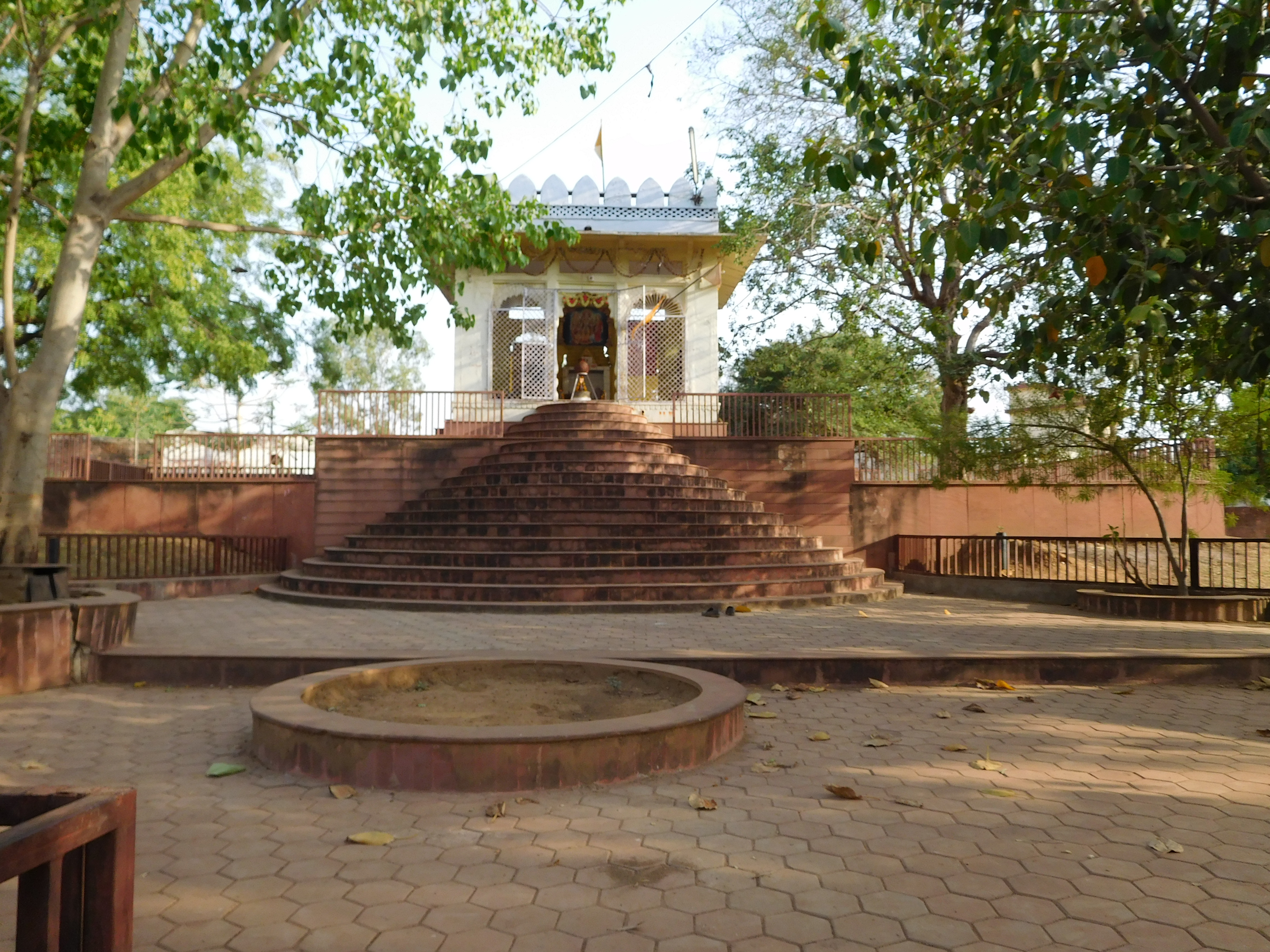
Shiv Temple on Chatari Road, Shivpuri, M.P.

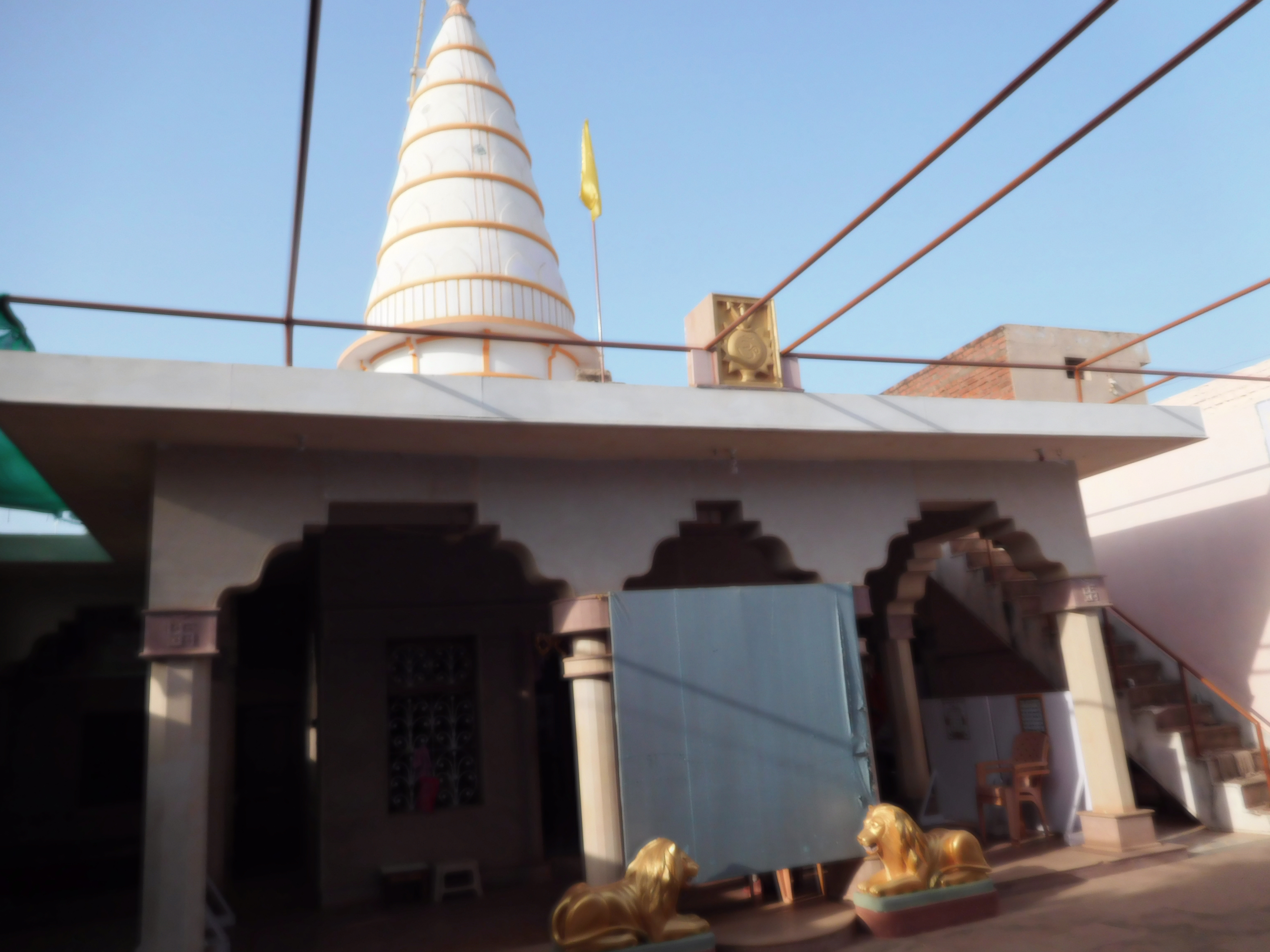
Shanti Nath Jinalaya

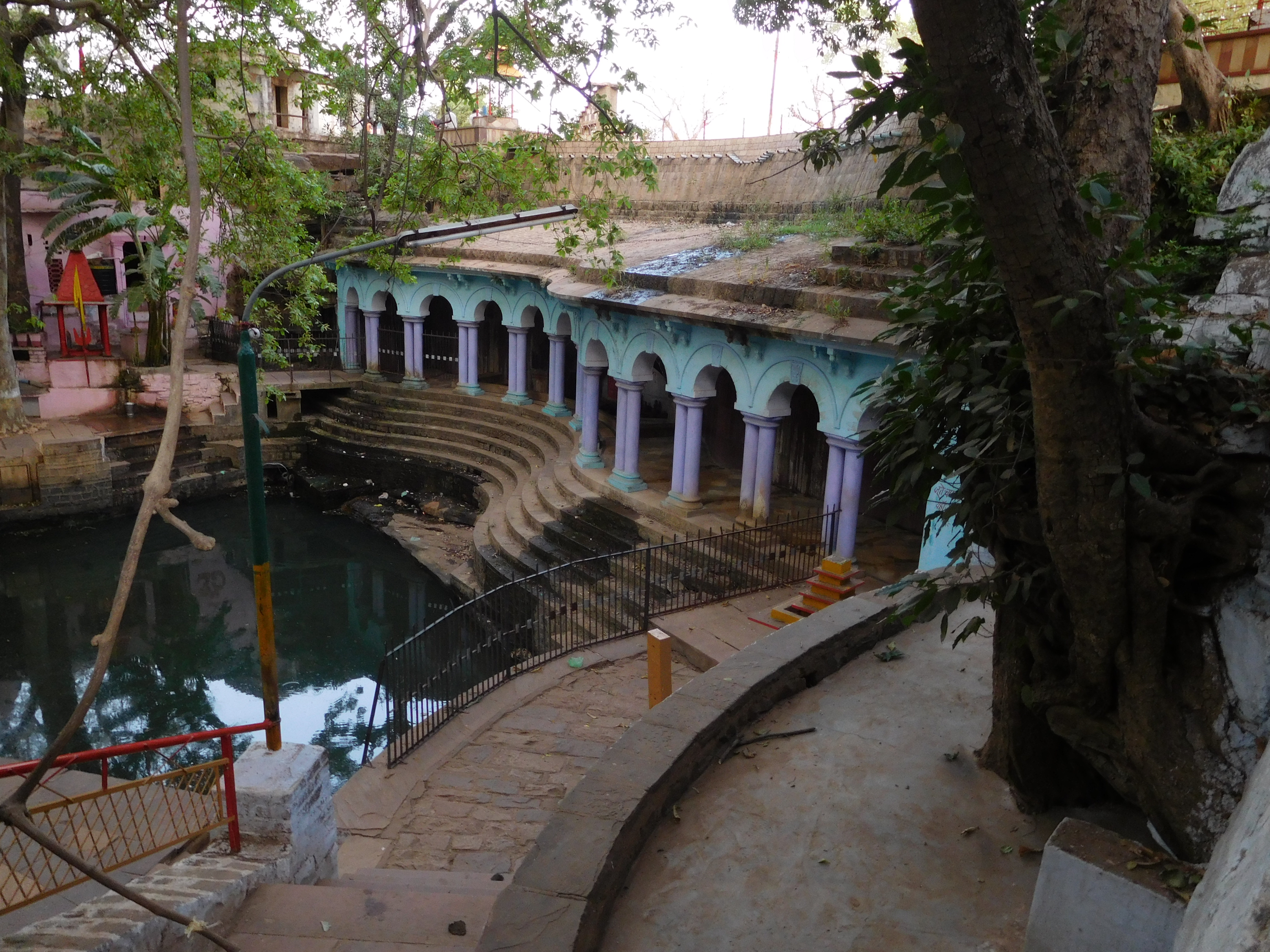
Bhadaiya Kund (main view)

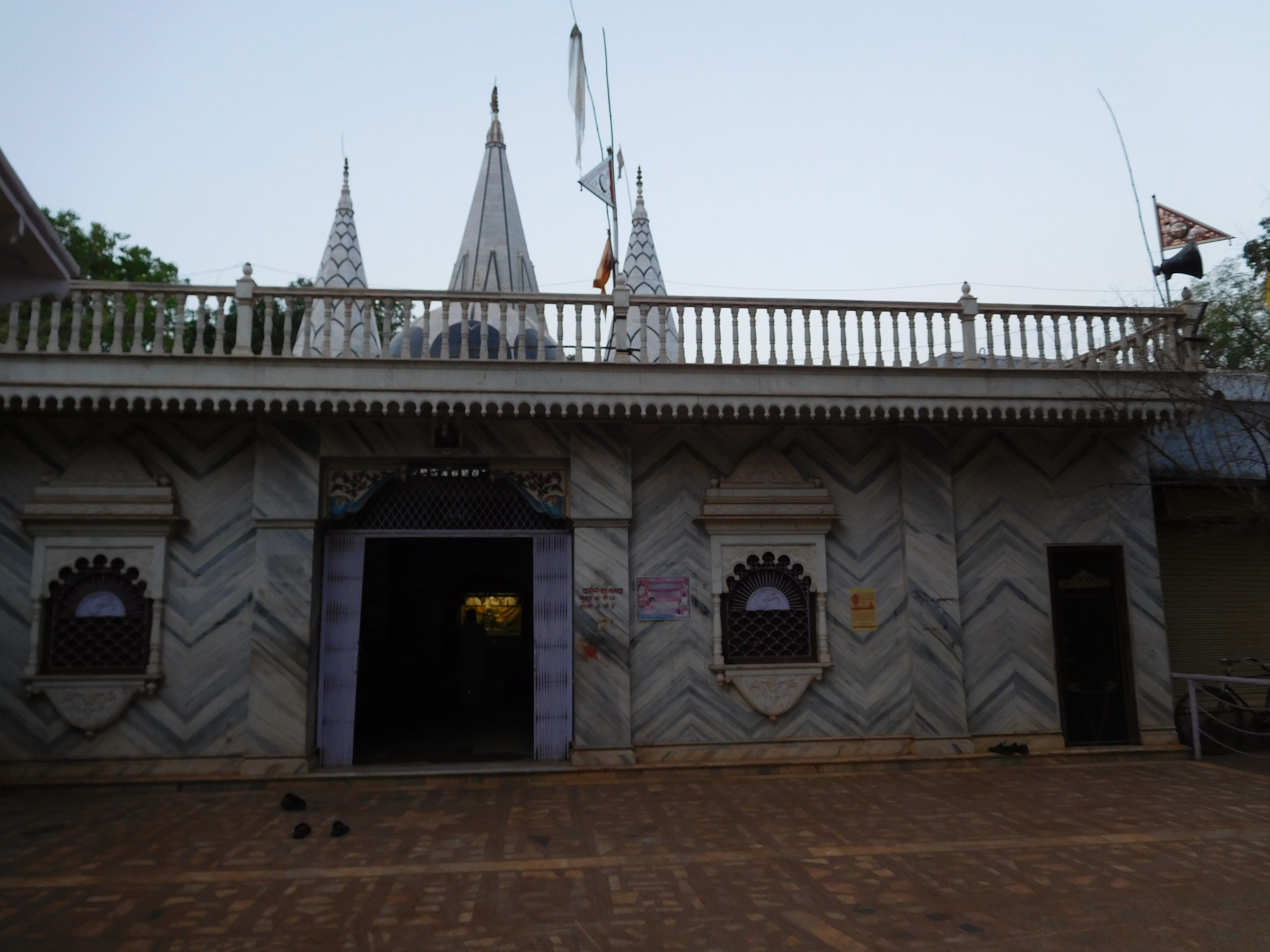
Ban Ganga Dham Temple (front) Shivpuri
