= Shivpuri =

- Town
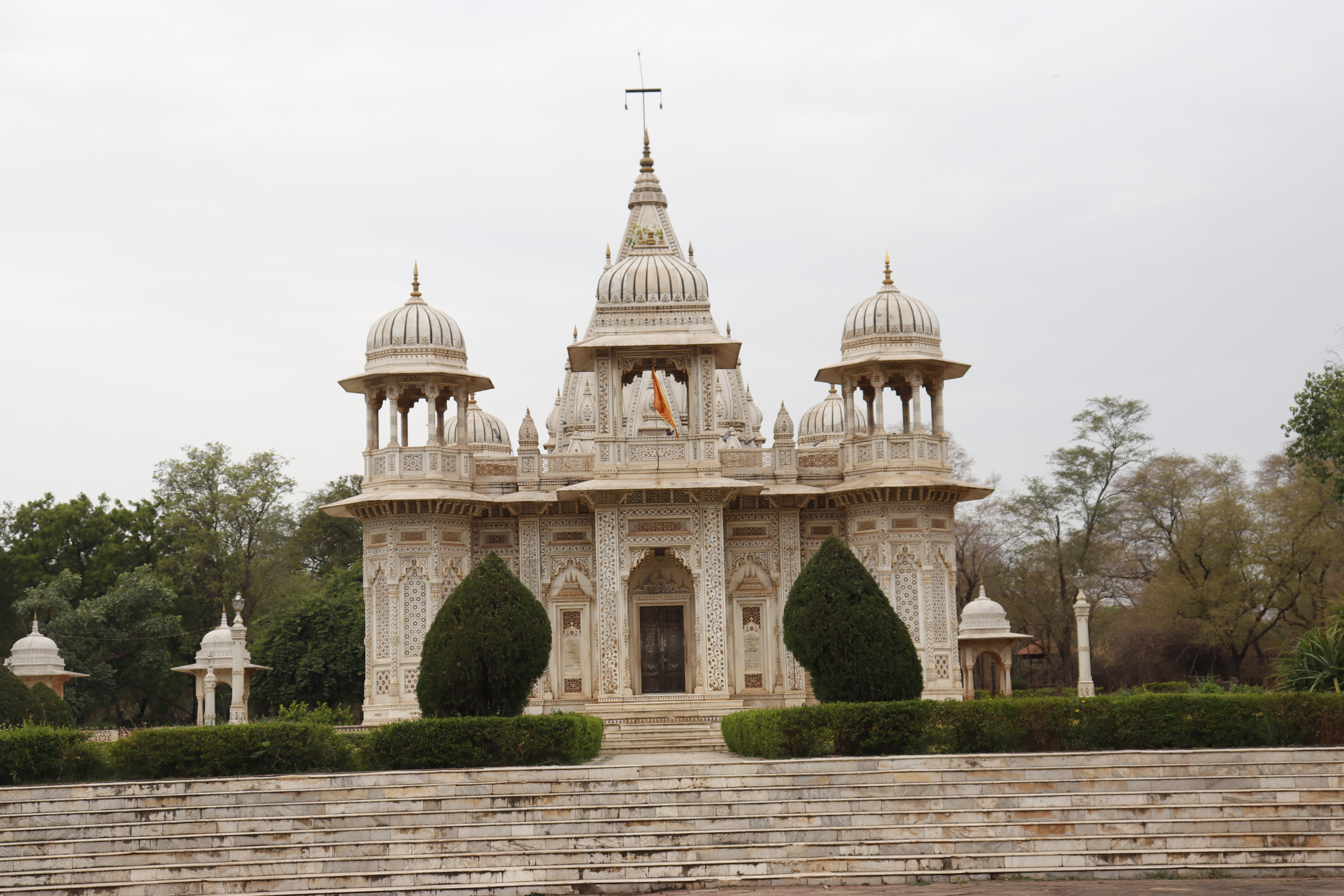
- Scindia cenotaphs, Shivpuri
- Nickname: Summer Capital of Scindias
- Location in Madhya Pradesh, India Shivpuri (India)
- Coordinates: 25.43°N 77.65°E
- Country: India
- State: Madhya Pradesh
- District: Shivpuri
- Region: Gwalior
- Elevation: 468 m (1,535 ft)

Population (2011)
  - Total: 179,977

Languages
  - Official: Official Hindi Other Bundeli
- Time zone: UTC+5:30 (IST)
- PIN: 473551
- ISO 3166 code: IN-MP
- Vehicle registration: MP-33
- Website: shivpuri.nic.in

Shivpuri, previously known as Sipri, is a town and a municipality in Shivpuri district, located in the central Indian state of Madhya Pradesh. It is in the Gwalior Division of northwest Madhya Pradesh and is the administrative headquarters of Shivpuri District. It is located approximately 125 km (78 mi) from Gwalior, 104 km (65 mi) from Jhansi 103 km (64 mi) from Guna and 337 km (211 mi) from Bhopal. It is situated at an altitude of 1,515 feet (462 m) above sea level.

The town is a tourist destination in the monsoon season as it has a number of waterfalls, like Bhura kho and Tunda Bharkha kho.

Lakes in Shivpuri include Chandpatha jheel, Jadhav Sagar jheel, and other small lakes.

The town is known for its greenery, forests, and also as the former summer capital of the Scindia Dynasty, who at one time ruled the Gwalior. A notable commander of 1857 rebellion, Tatya Tope was hanged in Shivpuri in 1859.. Shivpuri also has Asia's largest crater (the Dhala crater) which is almost 11 km in diameter.

== Geography ==
Shivpuri is situated at approximately 25.43° north latitude and 77.65° east longitude. By road, Shivpuri is approximately 120 km (74.5 mi) south of Gwalior and 96 km (59.6 mi) west of Jhansi. Shivpuri has an average elevation of approximately 462 metres (1,516 ft).

=== Climate ===
Shivpuri has a subtropical climate like most of the northern regions of India, that features three major seasons mainly: a hot summer, a monsoon season, and a cold winter.

==== Summer ====
Summer in Shivpuri arrives in April and lasts till June. During this period, Shivpuri remains hot, with an average high of 40 °C while the low stays around 26 °C. May is considered as the hottest month of the year when the average high temperature in the city climbs to 43 °C. However, as the season progresses, temperature drops slowly.

==== Monsoon season ====
Throughout the monsoon, July–September, Shivpuri experiences a much enjoyable temperature, with an average high of 34 °C. The minimum, on the other hand, fluctuates between 20 °C -24 °C.

==== Winter ====
The winter months remain cool and comfortable for people. The season, from November till March, remains somewhat chilly, with the average minimums of 8 °C while the low drops to 2 °C.

Climate data for Shivpuri (1991–2020, extremes 1960–2020)
Month	Jan	Feb	Mar	Apr	May	Jun	Jul	Aug	Sep	Oct	Nov	Dec	Year
Record high °C (°F)	33.0 (91.4)	35.4 (95.7)	42.0 (107.6)	45.6 (114.1)	47.2 (117.0)	46.0 (114.8)	43.0 (109.4)	38.6 (101.5)	38.6 (101.5)	38.7 (101.7)	39.3 (102.7)	31.5 (88.7)	47.2 (117.0)
Mean daily maximum °C (°F)	23.3 (73.9)	27.0 (80.6)	32.8 (91.0)	37.5 (99.5)	41.2 (106.2)	39.1 (102.4)	33.1 (91.6)	31.0 (87.8)	32.0 (89.6)	32.3 (90.1)	28.7 (83.7)	25.7 (78.3)	31.9 (89.4)
Mean daily minimum °C (°F)	7.8 (46.0)	11.2 (52.2)	16.3 (61.3)	21.5 (70.7)	26.0 (78.8)	26.4 (79.5)	24.5 (76.1)	23.5 (74.3)	23.0 (73.4)	19.1 (66.4)	13.3 (55.9)	8.8 (47.8)	18.4 (65.1)
Record low °C (°F)	−4.0 (24.8)	−2.2 (28.0)	2.0 (35.6)	8.7 (47.7)	15.5 (59.9)	16.5 (61.7)	17.0 (62.6)	18.0 (64.4)	13.7 (56.7)	8.9 (48.0)	2.1 (35.8)	−2.1 (28.2)	−4.0 (24.8)
Average rainfall mm (inches)	3.8 (0.15)	9.0 (0.35)	7.1 (0.28)	2.1 (0.08)	8.5 (0.33)	109.3 (4.30)	261.9 (10.31)	251.5 (9.90)	108.1 (4.26)	19.0 (0.75)	8.2 (0.32)	1.0 (0.04)	789.5 (31.08)
Average rainy days	0.5	1.1	0.7	0.3	0.6	4.5	10.5	11.0	5.6	1.3	0.8	0.1	37.0
Average relative humidity (%) (at 17:30 IST)	58	51	42	36	30	38	58	69	64	52	52	53	50
Source: India Meteorological Department

== History ==
The first historical mention of Sipri (Shivpuri) was of Emperor Akbar hunting elephants there in 1564.

In the 16th century, Shivpuri, like all of Gwalior, was part of the Maratha Empire. The empire weakened at the end of the century, and during the Gardi-ka-wakt, or 'period of unrest', the rajput of Narwar secured the town and district. The Sindhias, under Daulat Scindia, captured the town and district from the ruler of Narwar in 1804, and made the town their summer capital.

== Education ==
=== Schools ===
- St Charles school, Shivpuri
- St Benedict school, Shivpuri
- Kendriya Vidyalaya, Shivpuri
- Jawahar Navodaya Vidyalaya, Shivpuri
- eastern heights public school, shivpuri
- Geeta Public School

=== Colleges ===
- Rajmata Vijayaraje Scindia Medical College
- Shrimant Madhavrao Scindia P.G. College, Shivpuri
- Govt. Polytechnic College, Shivpuri
- University Institute of Technology RGPV Shivpuri

== Transportation ==
- Roadways, Shivpuri is well connected by roads. Gwalior is 125 Km while Bhopal is 337 km, Jhansi is 104 km and Guna is 110 km away from Shivpuri.
- Railway, Shivpuri railway station is located on Gwalior Indore line. Many train halts here. Its connect many major city of india.
- Airways, Nearest airport is Gwalior Airport, which is 134 km from Shivpuri .

== See also ==
- Madhav National Park
- Dhala crater
- Government Medical College, Shivpuri
- List of cities in Madhya Pradesh
