= Chachaura district =

Proposed district in Madhya Pradesh, India

Chachaura district चाचौड़ा ज़िला
- Proposed district
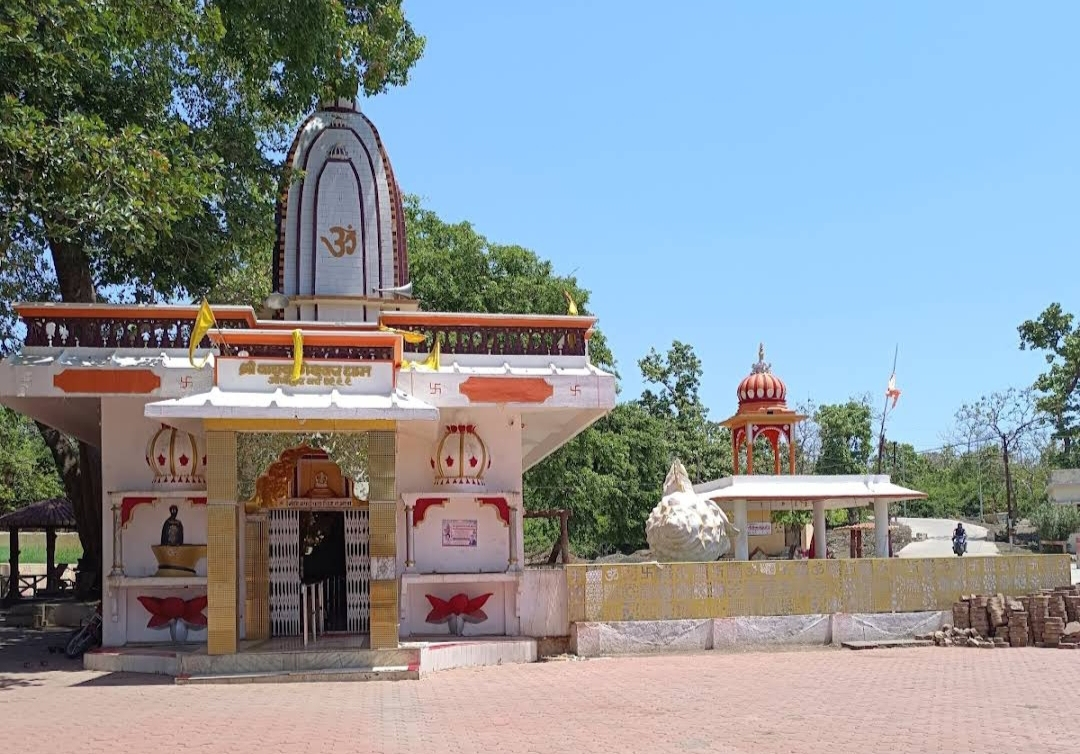
- Shri Baag Bageshwar Temple, Chachaura

- Location in Madhya Pradesh
- Coordinates: 24°10′54″N 77°00′29″E
- Country: India
- State: Madhya Pradesh
- Division: Gwalior
- Headquarter: Chachoura
- Tehsils: Chachaura, Kumbhraj, Maksoodangarh

Government
  - Vidhan Sabha constituencies: Chachoura & some part of Raghogarh
  - Lok Sabha constituencies: Rajgarh (shared with Guna, Rajgarh & Agar district)

Language
  - Official: Hindi
- Time zone: UTC+5:30 (IST)

Chachaura district is a proposed district in Madhya Pradesh, India. On 18 March 2020, the bill to create Chachaura district was passed by the state cabinet. Chachaura, currently falls in Guna district. Chachaura district will be formed separated from Guna district. The headquarter of the Chachaura district will be Chachoura.

== Formation ==
The formation of Chachaura district will accelerate development work in the area. Guna district consists of four assembly constituencies; Chachoura, Raghogarh, Guna and Bamori, out of which the entire Chachoura and some part of Raghogarh will be merged to form Chachaura district. The area of proposed district will include three tehsils Chachaura, Kumbhraj and Maksoodangarh.

== Historical importance ==
Chachaura had a significant history. The old name of Chachaura is Champavati. The Champavati Fort was built in the 16th-17th century, and this Fort is also a State Protected Monument of Madhya Pradesh. There are Baag Bageshwar Dhaam, Hanuman Temple Chaan, Ambala Dhaam, Bade Ganpati Temple, Sita Bavari, Choudhaleshwar Dhaam and other many old and famous devotional places also present.

== Economic position ==
Chachaura is a tribal and backward class dominated area. The economy of this region is based on agriculture. In agriculture production this region is known for the production of coriander. And the coriander here is famous not only in the country but also abroad.

== See also ==
- Chachoda
- Champavati Fort
