= Chachaura, India =

City & Municipal council in Madhya Pradesh, India

Chachaura Chachoda
- City
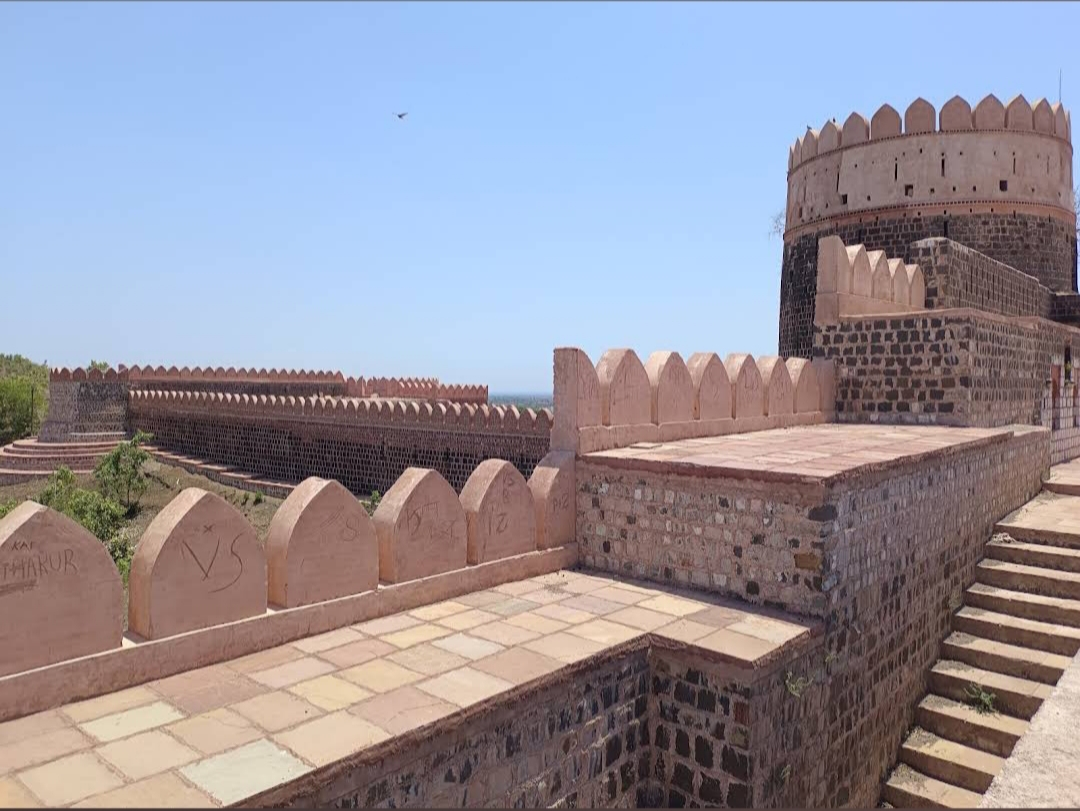
- View of Champavati Fort in Chachaura

- (Chachaura City in Madhya Pradesh, India) Chachaura (India)
- Coordinates: 24°10′38″N 77°00′00″E
- Country: India
- State: Madhya Pradesh
- Division: Gwalior
- District: Guna
- Lok Sabha constituency: Rajgarh
- Vidhansabha Constituency: Chachoura
- Tehsil: Chachaura

Government
  - Type: Municipal Council
  - Body: Council

Area
  - Total: 12 km^{2} (4.6 sq mi)
- Elevation: 475 m (1,558 ft)

Population (2011)
  - Total: 21,860
  - Density: 1,850/km^{2} (4,800/sq mi)

Languages
  - Official: Hindi
- Time zone: UTC+5:30 (IST)
- Postal code (PIN): 473118
- Area code: 07546
- ISO 3166 code: IN-MP
- Vehicle registration: MP08

Chachaura is a city and Municipal council in Madhya Pradesh, India, situated on the border with Rajasthan. The primary language spoken in the city is Hindi. Chachaura is one of seven tehsil and one of five subdivisions in the Guna district. Chachaura is also an assembly constituency of Madhya Pradesh. Chachaura is divided into 15 wards for which elections are held every 5 years.

Chachaura is a proposed district of Madhya pradesh, which was approved by cabinet on 18 March 2020.

== Demographics ==
As of the 2001 Census of India, 17,303 people lived in Chachaura.

As of the 2011 Census of India, 21,860 people live in Chachaura, out of which 11,502 are males and 10,358 are females. In 2024, Chachaura's population was estimated at 30,900.

Religions in Chachaura City (2011)
Religion	Percent
Hinduism	88.29%
Islam	9.47%
Jainism	2.08%
Other or not stated	0.16%

Major castes found in this region are Meena, Gujjar, Bhil, and Lodha people.

== Places ==
- Shri Baag Bageshwar Dhaam
- Shri Hanuman Temple Chhan
- Shri Ambala Dhaam (Guruji Ashram)
- Shri Bade Ganesh Temple (Dundalaji)
- Shri Bharat Lal Temple
- Shri Digamber Jain Temple
- Gayatri Shakti Peeth
- Maa Mahishasur Mardini Temple (Near of Fort)
- Shri Hanuman Temple (Near of Lake)
- Shri Satya Narayan Temple
- Shri Bhakt Maliji Temple
- Shri Ram Janki Temple (Sadar Bazar)
- Nearest places-

Sita Bawri Place, Choudareshwar Mahadev Temple

== Transportation ==
- Bhopal Airport and Gwalior Airport are the nearest airport
- Chachaura Binaganj railway station and Indore-Gwalior railway line serve the city
- Agra-Mumbai National highway passes nearby

== See also ==
- Chachaura district
- Chachaura Fort
