= Priyanka Penchi =

Indian politician

Priyanka Meena

Member of the 16th Madhya Pradesh Assembly
- Incumbent
- Assumed office December 2023
- Preceded by: Lakshman Singh
- Constituency: Chachoura

Personal details
- Born: 3 February 1991 (age 35)
- Party: Bhartiya Janta Party
- Spouse: Praduman Meena
- Education: Bachelor of Technology
- Alma mater: Rajasthan Technical University
- Occupation: Politician

Priyanka Penchi (born 1991) is an Indian politician from Madhya Pradesh. She is a member of the Madhya Pradesh Legislative Assembly representing the Bharatiya Janata Party from Chachoura Assembly constituency in Guna district. She won the 2023 Madhya Pradesh Legislative Assembly election.

== Early life and education ==
Penchi is from Chachoura, Guna district, Madhya Pradesh, India. She married Praduman Meena, an Indian Revenue Service [IRS] officer. She completed her graduation in Bachelor of Technology (Electrical and electronics) at Rajasthan Technical University, Kota, in 2014.

== Early Political Career ==
Priyanka Penchi began her political career by contesting the Zila Panchayat member election in 2022. She lost to former MLA Mamta Meena by 235 votes. Later in February 2023, Penchi joined BJP.

== Career ==
Priyanka Penchi was elected to the Madhya Pradesh Legislative Assembly for the first time in the 2023 elections, representing the Bharatiya Janata Party from the Chachoura Assembly constituency. She secured 110,254 votes and defeated her nearest rival, Lakshman Singh of the Indian National Congress, by a margin of 61,570 votes. Penchi was nominated as the BJP candidate for the Chachoura Assembly constituency, ahead of former MLA Mamta Meena, who contested the 2018 assembly elections on a BJP ticket and lost to Lakshman Singh, brother of former chief minister Digvijaya Singh.

== Controversy ==
In June 2025, Penchi wrote a letter to the chief minister Mohan Yadav making allegations on Guna district Superintendent of Police Ankit Soni. She objected to some police transfers in her constituency some of which were stayed later. Later, Gwalior range IGP Arvind Saxena said that the issue was resolved.
