= Kunjakheda village =

Indian Village in Madhya Pradesh

Kunjakheda is an Indian village in Kumbhraj. It is located in the Guna district, Madhya Pradesh. As of the 2011 census, it has a population of 491.
