= Naderī satī stone inscription =

Naderī
- village
- Location within Madhya Pradesh
- Coordinates: 24.4036°N 78.1120°E
- Country: India
- State: Madhya Pradesh
- Region: Gwalior
- District: Gwalior
- Elevation: 196 m (643 ft)

Languages
  - Official: Hindi
- Time zone: UTC+5:30 (IST)
- PIN: 474001 (HPO)

The Naderī satī stone inscription is an epigraphic record documenting the self-immolation of a woman after the death of her husband. It has been assigned to the fifth or sixth century CE.

== Location ==
Naderi is located in Guna District, Madhya Pradesh, India, to the south of the town of Chanderi.

== Publication ==
The inscription has been noted by M. B. Garde, H. N. Dvivedī and M. Willis in their respective epigraphic lists.

== Description and Contents ==
The inscription is written in Sanskrit and appears to record the satī of a woman after her husband was killed by a lion. The inscription is dated 66 or the initial numbers of the date have been omitted; palaeography suggests a date in the 5th or 6th century.

== See also ==
- Indian inscriptions
