= Battle of Pilsud =

War between Marathas and Jaipur

Date	10 May 1715
Location	Pilsud, Barwani district, Madhya Pradesh
Result	Rajput victory

Belligerents
Kingdom of Amber: Bundelkhand; Bundi; Raghogarh	Maratha Confederacy: Afghan chieftains

Commanders and leaders
Jai Singh II; Chhatrasal Bundela; Budh Singh Hada; Dhiraj Singh Khichi	Kanhoji Bhonsle; Khanderao Dabhade; Ganga Rao; Dilir Khan; Inayat Khan

Strength
10,000 Rajputs	42,000 Marathas

The Battle of Pilsud was fought between Sawai Jai Singh and the Marathas under Kanhoji Bhonsle and Khanderao Dabhade.

== Background ==
In Jai Singh's first year of commanding, his force of 10,000 seasoned soldiers, including well-equipped musketeers, artillery, and ample financial resources, entered Malwa to combat the marauders. His reputation as an experienced commander from Aurangzeb's wars had preceded him, and he had capable lieutenants such as Chhatrasal Bundela and Budh Singh Hada. By the end of 1714, he had suppressed much of the disorder in Malwa. The Marathas, likely distracted by internal conflicts, refrained from launching any major raids that winter, and the local rebels, after facing swift punishment, either surrendered or went into hiding. Recognizing his success, the emperor sent him a robe of honor on 13 August 1714, accompanied by a letter of appreciation that read, "You have not left any trace of the robbers; travelers can now pass in peace".

A week after reaching Ujjain, he launched a campaign against the Afghan chief Inayet, who had been pillaging near the city with a band of 7,000 horsemen. Jai Singh dispatched Nandlal Choudhuri to confront him, forcing the Afghans to retreat towards Shajahanpur. Later, Dilir Afghan was defeated near Kashigaon on 25 March 1714, and Mohan Singh, a Umat Rajput rebel aligned with Ruhela mercenaries, was killed on 14 April. In early May, Jai Singh sent a Bundela contingent under Chhatrasal's son to Khimlasa and Bhorasa, which prompted the Maratha camp south of the Narmada to abandon any plans of crossing into Malwa. Having dealt with these threats, he returned to Ujjain on 12 May.

In August, highway robberies were reported near Narwar, necessitating the establishment of a military outpost. Meanwhile, Puranmal Ahir led a rebellion in the Ahir region, blocking the Sironj-Kalabagh road and using his fortresses at Ranod and Ondhera to challenge the administration for several months.

Jai Singh next travelled to the Mewar frontier, where a succession dispute had been raging since Aurangzeb's time. On 24 January 1715, Gopal Singh Chandrawat, the rightful heir, managed to reclaim Rampura from Badan Singh, the son of his dispossessed father, Ratan Singh—who had been converted to Islam by Aurangzeb and renamed Islam Khan. Jai Singh supported Gopal Singh's claim and soon mediated a settlement between the old chief and his grandson, as the Afghan mercenaries hired in this family feud were wreaking havoc on the small principality.

In 1715, Jai Singh expelled the Maratha raider called Ganga and then marched towards Sironj, where he defeated the Afghans. The Afghans under Dilir Khan called the Marathas for help against him. The Amber Raja, upon learning about the large host of Marathas that were approaching, quickly attacked Dilir. On 2 April, he attacked the Afghan army of 12,000 men and defeated them. 2000 Afghans were killed in battle while the Amber army lost 500 men. Jai Singh then turned towards the Afghan camp in Bhilsa and defeated it. It was at this time that reports started coming about two large Maratha armies that had entered Malwa. Kanhoji Bhonsle and Khande Rao Dabhade with an army of 42,000 men had crossed the Narmada River on 1–2 April and had made their camps at Tilwara. They pillaged within 4 miles of the provincial capital and looted and burnt the city of Depalpur.

== Battle ==
On 5 April, the Marathas sent an army of 12,000 horsemen to Barwah. They marched around Indore and demanded chauth from the province of Kampel. Upon learning of these developments, Jai Singh quickly marched towards Ujjain and sent his deputy to secure his capital. On 8 May, the Amber Raja moved towards the Marathas, while the Maratha commanders, Kanho and Ganga, were deciding how to cross the Narmada with all the loot they had collected. Jai Singh marched towards them, covering 38 miles, and arrived before the Maratha camp on 10 May. The Marathas, upon seeing the small Amber army, became confident in their numbers and advanced to fight them. The travel-worn Rajputs also advanced. Budh Singh Hada, Chatrasal Bundela, Dhiraj Singh Khichi, and several minor Jagirdars were under the command of Jai Singh. After a four-hour fight, the Marathas broke and started fleeing. The Marathas fled six miles away from the field of battle into the mountains of Pilsud and confidently marched in the mountainous region, thinking that they had escaped. However, Jai Singh chased them the whole night and caught up to them on 11 May. Upon seeing the Amber army, the Marathas fled to the Narmada River and left all of their loot.

== Aftermath ==
The Maratha army was forced to leave two months' worth of loot that they had acquired from Malwa and Khandesh. Jai allowed his men to keep the spoils of war. "Everyone gained booty enough to feed him for years". The emperor praised Jai Singh for his achievement, and the local jagirdars confessed that no imperial officer had inflicted such a great victory in Malwa against the Marathas.
