= Chachoura =

Town in Madhya Pradesh, India

Chachoura चाचौड़ा
- Town
- Location in Madhya Pradesh, India Chachoura (India)
- Coordinates: 24°10′54″N 77°00′29″E
- Country: India
- State: Madhya Pradesh
- Division: Gwalior
- District: Guna
- Lok sabha constituency: Rajgarh
- Vidhansabha Constituency: Chachoura
- Tehsil: Chachaura

Languages
  - Official: Hindi
- Time zone: UTC+5:30 (IST)
- Postal code (PIN): 473118
- Area code: 07546
- ISO 3166 code: IN-MP
- Vehicle registration: MP08

Chachoura is a town in Chachaura tehsil of Guna district, Madhya Pradesh, India. It's the administrative and revenue headquarter of Chachaura tehsil and subdivision.

== Geography ==
Chachoura is situated at coordinate 24°10′54″N 77°00′29″E, It has an average elevation 475 metres (1,558 ft).

== Location ==
Chachoura is around 65 kilometres (40 mi) from Guna, towards South and around 282 kilometres (175 mi) from Gwalior, in same direction. Indore is around 226 kilometres (140 mi) from Chachoura, towards the south.

Jhalawar and Kota are 112 kilometres (70 mi) & 202 kilometres (126 mi) respectively from Chachoura, towards the west. Bhopal is around 155 kilometres (96 mi) kilometres from Chachoura, towards the southeast.

== Nearest towns ==
- Manohar Thana - 24 kilometres (15 mi)
- Kumbhraj - 29 kilometres (18 mi)
- Biaora - 37 kilometres (23 mi)
- Raghogarh - 40 kilometres (25 mi)
- Rajgarh - 61 kilometres (38 mi)

== See also ==
- Champavati Fort
