= Chachoura Assembly constituency =

Constituency of the Madhya Pradesh legislative assembly in India

Coordinates: 24.17°N 77.00°E

Chachoura
- Constituency No. 30 for the Madhya Pradesh Legislative Assembly

Constituency details
- Country: India
- Region: Central India
- State: Madhya Pradesh
- District: Guna
- Lok Sabha constituency: Rajgarh
- Established: 1951
- Reservation: None

Member of Legislative Assembly
- 16th Madhya Pradesh Legislative Assembly
- Incumbent Priyanka Penchi
- Party: Bharatiya Janata Party
- Elected year: 2023
- Preceded by: Lakshman Singh

Chachoura Assembly constituency is one of the 230 Vidhan Sabha (Legislative Assembly) constituencies of Madhya Pradesh state in central India. This constituency came into existence in 1951, as one of the 79 Vidhan Sabha constituencies of the erstwhile Madhya Bharat state.

Incumbent MLA from Chachoura is Priyanka Penchi from Bharatiya Janata Party.

== Overview ==
Chachoura (constituency number 30) is one of the 4 Vidhan Sabha constituencies located in Guna district. This constituency covers the entire Chachaura and Kumbhraj tehsil and part of Maksudangarh tehsil.

Chachoura is part of Rajgarh Lok Sabha constituency along with seven other Vidhan Sabha segments, namely, Raghogarh in this district, Narsinghgarh, Biaora, Rajgarh, Khilchipur and Sarangpur in Rajgarh district and Susner in Agar Malwa district.

== Members of Legislative Assembly ==
As a constituency of Madhya Bharat state:

Election	Name	Party
1952	Dwarkadas Ramnarayan	Hindu Mahasabha

As a constituency of Madhya Pradesh state:

Election	Name	Party
1957	Sagar Singh Sisodia	Indian National Congress
1962	Prabhu Lal Meena	Independent
1967	Sagar Singh Sisodia	Swatantra Party
1972	Krishna Vallabh Gupta	Bharatiya Jana Sangh
1977	Krishna Vallabh Gupta	Janata Party
1980	Devendra Singh	Indian National Congress (I)
1985	Devendra Singh	Indian National Congress
1990	Ram Bahadur Singh Parihar	Bharatiya Janata Party
1993	Shivnarayan Meena	Indian National Congress
1994^By poll	Digvijaya Singh	Indian National Congress
1998	Shivnarayan Meena	Indian National Congress
2003	Shivnarayan Meena	Indian National Congress
2008	Shivnarayan Meena	Indian National Congress
2013	Mamta Meena	Bharatiya Janata Party
2018	Lakshman Singh	Indian National Congress
2023	Priyanka Penchi	Bharatiya Janata Party

== Election results ==
=== 2023 ===
2023 Madhya Pradesh Legislative Assembly election: Chachoura
Party	Candidate	Votes	%	±%
BJP	Priyanka Meena Penchi	110,254	56.47	▲12.63
INC	Lakshman Singh	48,684	24.93	▼24.86
AAP	Mamta Meena	27,405	14.04	▲13.64
NOTA	None of the above	2,249	1.15	▼0.41
Majority		61,570	31.54	▲25.59
Turnout		195,247	82.48	▲1.60
BJP gain from INC		Swing		

=== 2018 ===
2018 Madhya Pradesh Legislative Assembly election: Chachoura
Party	Candidate	Votes	%	±%
INC	Lakshman Singh	81,908	49.79	▲16.77
BJP	Mamta Meena	72,111	43.84	▼13.26
NOTA	None of the above	2,569	1.56	▼0.35
Majority		9,797	5.95	▼18.12
Turnout		164,502	80.88	▲6.70
INC gain from BJP		Swing		

=== 2013 ===
2013 Madhya Pradesh Legislative Assembly election: Chachoura
Party	Candidate	Votes	%	±%
BJP	Mamta Meena	82,779	57.10	▲31.14
INC	Shivnarayan Meena	47,878	33.02	▼0.94
BSP	Kailash Narayan Meena	4,942	3.41	▼6.10
NOTA	None of the above	2,766	1.91	New
Majority		34,901	24.07	▲16.07
Turnout		144,979	74.18	▲5.61
BJP gain from INC		Swing		

=== 2008 ===
2008 Madhya Pradesh Legislative Assembly election: Chachoura
Party	Candidate	Votes	%	±%
INC	Shivnarayan Meena	34,063	33.96	▼15.83
BJP	Mamta Meena	26,041	25.96	▼20.58
BJSH	Ramnarayan Lodha	12,653	12.62	New
BSP	Harisingh Gurjar	9,534	9.51	New
Independent	Mansingh Bhil	8,970	8.94	New
Majority		8,022	8.00	▲4.75
Turnout		100,297	68.57	▲8.47
INC hold		Swing		

=== 1994 By-election ===
1994 By-election: Chachoura
Party	Candidate	Votes	%	±%
INC	Digvijay Singh	53,621		
BJP	Ram Valabh	14,727		
Majority		38,894		
INC hold		Swing		

- Note: Complete information is not available.

== See also ==
- Chachaura
- Chachaura tehsil
- Champavati Fort, 16th-17th century fort & state protected monument.
- Chachaura district, proposed district of Madhya Pradesh.
- Guna district
- Madhya Pradesh Vidhan Sabha
