= Bhador (Guna) =

Village in Madhya Pradesh, India

Coordinates: 24°30′N 77°26′E

Bhador is a village in Guna district of Madhya Pradesh in India.
