= Hāsalpur inscription of Nāgavarman =

Hāsalpur
- village
- Location within India Location within Madhya Pradesh
- Coordinates: 25.5638°N 76.5140°E
- Country: India
- State: Madhya Pradesh
- Region: Gird
- District: Gwalior
- Elevation: 196 m (643 ft)

Population
  - Total: 1,822

Languages
  - Official: Hindi
- Time zone: UTC+5:30 (IST)
- PIN: 474001 (HPO)

The Hāsalpur inscription of Nāgavarman is an epigraphic record on a memorial stone documenting the exploits of a ruler named Nāgavarman. It is not dated but has been assigned to the mid-sixth century CE.

== Location ==
Hāsalpur (sometimes Hansalpur or Hasilpur) is located in Sheopur District near the River Chambal in northern Madhya Pradesh, India. The nearest town is Dhodhar where a small fort is situated. The memorial stone is now in the Archaeological Museum at Gwalior.

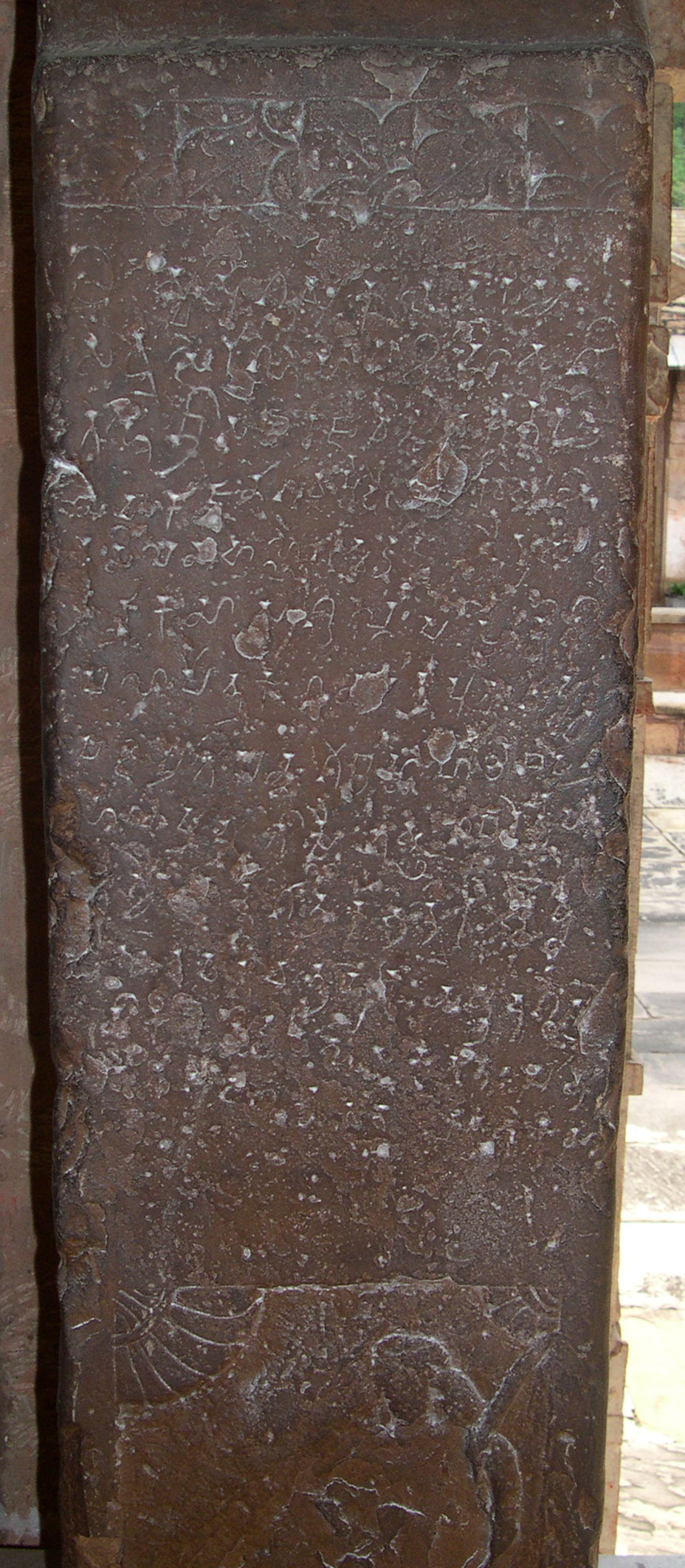
Inscribed face of the hero-stone from Hāsalpur. Archaeological Museum, Gwalior.

== Publication ==
The inscription was first noted by M. B. Garde in 1916-17 and again in 1934. It was later listed by H. N. Dvivedī, H. V. Trivedi and Michael Willis. The listing in the Annual Report on Indian Epigraphy for 1952-52 gives the wrong find-spot. An illustration of the hero-stone appeared in the Journal of the Royal Asiatic Society in 1970.

== Description and contents ==
The inscription is written in Sanskrit over 13 lines. The exact contents have not been reported but Nāgavarman seems to be among the local kings who rose against Mihirakula and the Hūṇas in the early to mid-sixth century.

== Text ==
The inscription has been read only in part. The king's name is given in line 4.

1)

2)

3)

4) mahārāja-nāgavarmma-

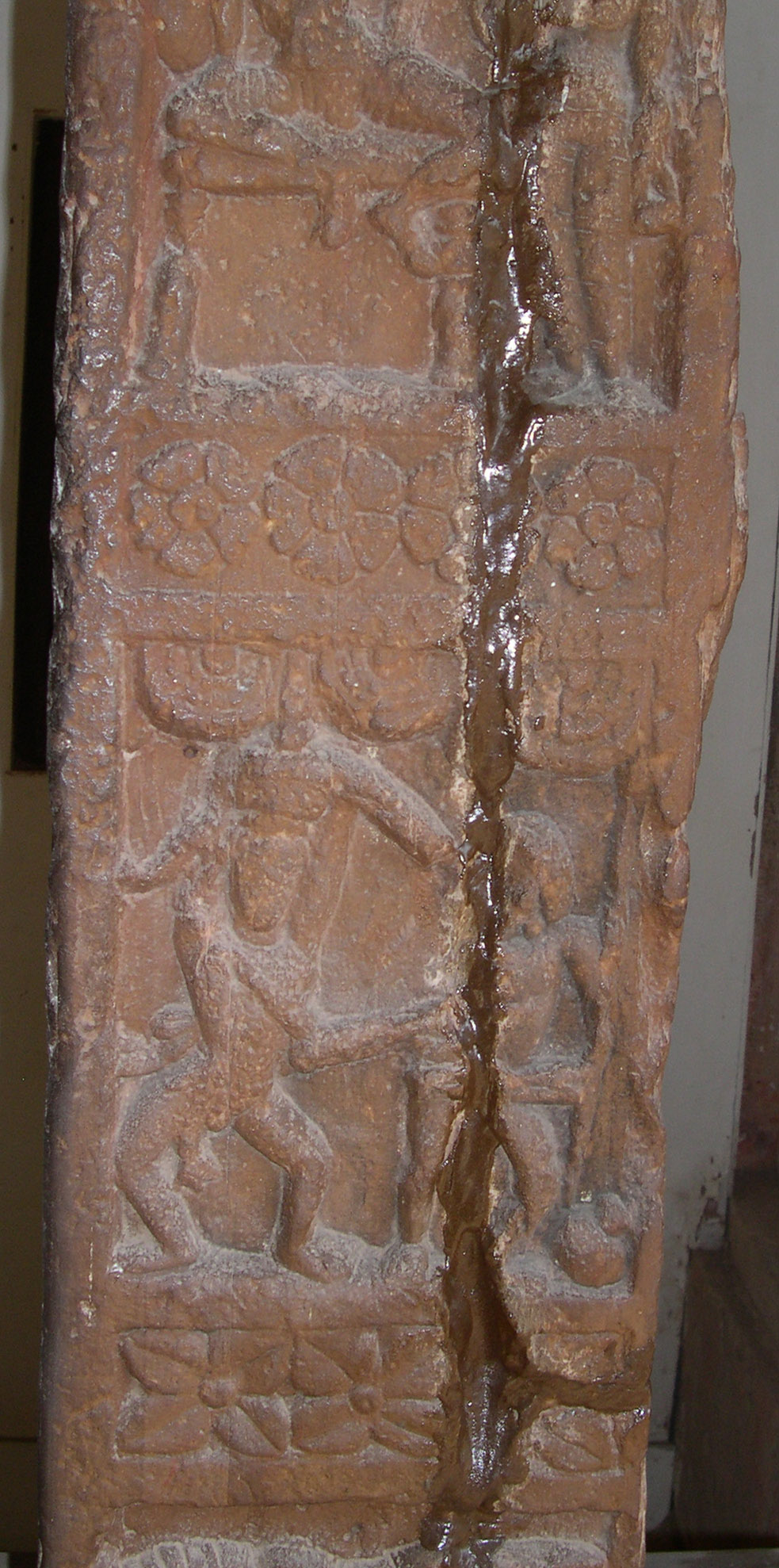
Detail of the relief carving on the Hāsalpur hero-stone. Archaeological Museum, Gwalior

== See also ==
- Indian inscriptions
