= Raghogarh State =

Indian princely state

Coordinates: 25°26′N 77°15′E

Raghogarh State Raghugarh / Khichiwara
- Vassal State of Mughal Empire (1673–1780); Vassal State of Maratha Confederacy (1780–1818); Princely State of British India (1818–1947)
- 1673–1947
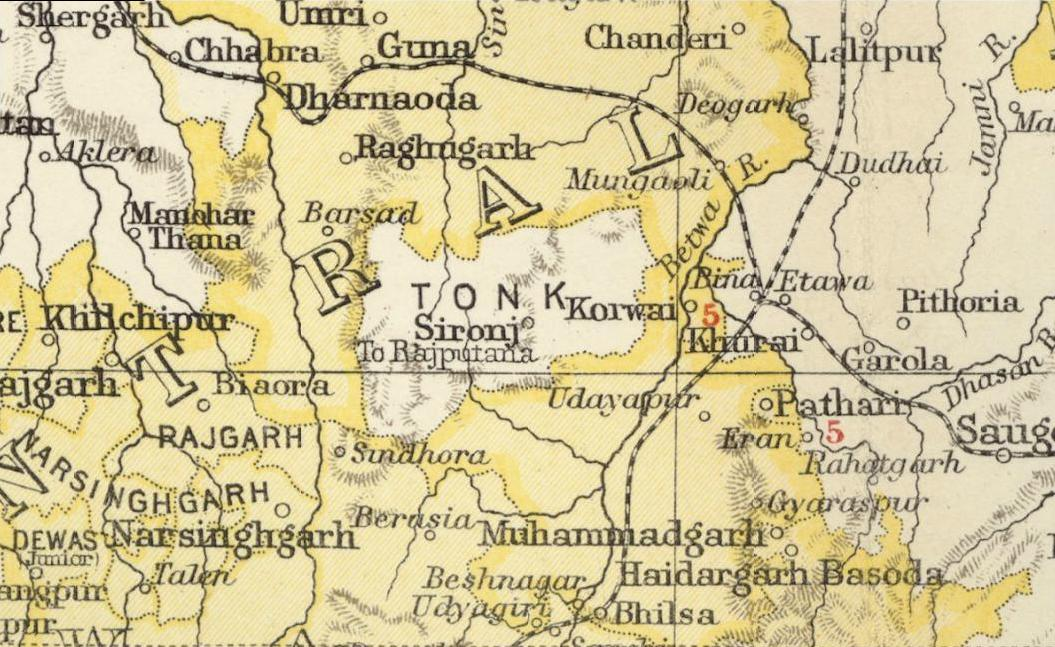
- Raghogarh State in the Imperial Gazetteer of India
- Capital: Raghogarh
- Area
  - 1901: 109 km^{2} (42 sq mi)
- Population
  - 1901: 19,446
- Government
- Raja
  - 1673–1697: Lal Singh (first)
  - 1945–1947: Balabhadra Singh II (last)
- History
  - Established: 1673
  - Independence of India: 1947
Succeeded by
India
- Today part of: Guna district, Madhya Pradesh, India

Raghogarh estate or Raghugarh and Khichiwarais a estate of the Gwalior Residency, under the Central India Agency of the British Raj. It was a Thikana estate of about 109 km^{2} with a population of 19,446 inhabitants in 1901. The Parbati River marked the western border of the state. The capital was at Raghogarh in the present-day Guna district of Madhya Pradesh.

== History ==
Raghogarh State was established in 1673 by Lal Singh Khichi, a Rajput of the Khichi Chauhan clan. The founder of Delhi, Prithviraj Chauhan, also belonged to this clan. The state took its name from the fort of Raghogarh, founded in 1673 by Raja Lal Singh in 1677. Raghogarh's fortune declined due to Maratha attacks led by Mahadaji Shinde which took place around 1780. By 1818, there were disputes regarding succession in Raghogarh, which were settled through the intervention of the British authorities.

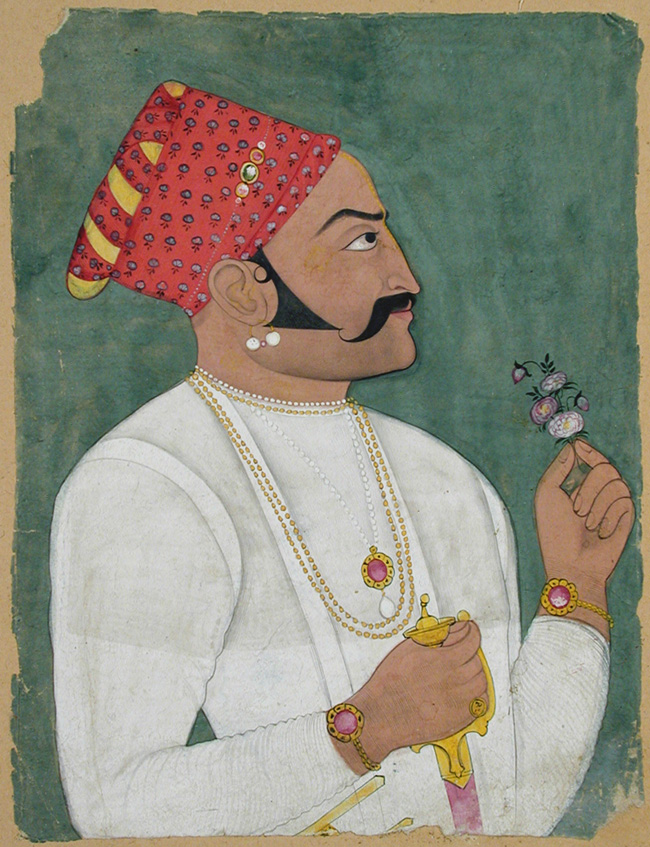
Raja Dhiraj Singh of Raghogarh (1697/1726)

=== Rulers ===
Name		Notes	Reign began	Reign ended
1	Raja Lal Singh	founder of the state	1673	1697
2	Raja Dhiraj Singh		1697	1726
3	Raja Gaj Singh		1726	1729
4	Raja Vikramaditya I		1730	1744
5	Raja Balabhadra Singh I		1744	1770
6	Raja Balwant Singh		1770	1797
7	Raja Jai Singh		1797	1818
8	Raja Ajit Singh		1818	1856
9	Raja Jai Mandal Singh		1856	1900
10	Raja Vikramjit Singh II		1900	1902
11	Raja Bahadur Singh		1902	1945
12	Raja Balabhadra Singh II	last ruler	1945	1967
13	Raja Digvijaya Singh	titular ruler	1967	present

The ruling family were members of the Khichi Chauhan Dynasty of Rajputs. The rulers used the title of Raja.

== See also ==
- Madhya Pradesh
- Political integration of India
- Dhiraj Singh (Khichi)
- Champavati Fort
