= Bhadora Jagir railway station =

Railway station in Madhya Pradesh, India

Bhadora Jagir

General information
- Location: Gwar Kheda, Bhadaura, Guna district, Madhya Pradesh; India
- Coordinates: 24°47′13″N 77°24′43″E
- Elevation: 487 m (1,598 ft)
- System: Passenger train station
- Owner: Indian Railways
- Operator: West Central Railway
- Line: Indore–Gwalior line
- Platforms: 1
- Tracks: 1

Construction
- Structure type: Standard (on ground station)

Other information
- Status: Active
- Station code: BDJR
- Zone(s): West Central Railway zone
- Division(s): Bhopal

History
- Opened: 1899
- Former names: Gwalior Light Railway

Services
Preceding station	Indian Railways	Following station
Miyana towards ?	West Central Railway zone Indore–Gwalior line	Taravata towards ?
Location

Bhadora Jagir railway station is a railway station on Indore–Gwalior line under the Bhopal railway division of West Central Railway zone. This is situated at Gwar Kheda, Bhadaura in Guna district of the Indian state of Madhya Pradesh.
