= Miyana, Madhya Pradesh =

Town in Guna District of Madhya Pradesh

Miyana
- Town
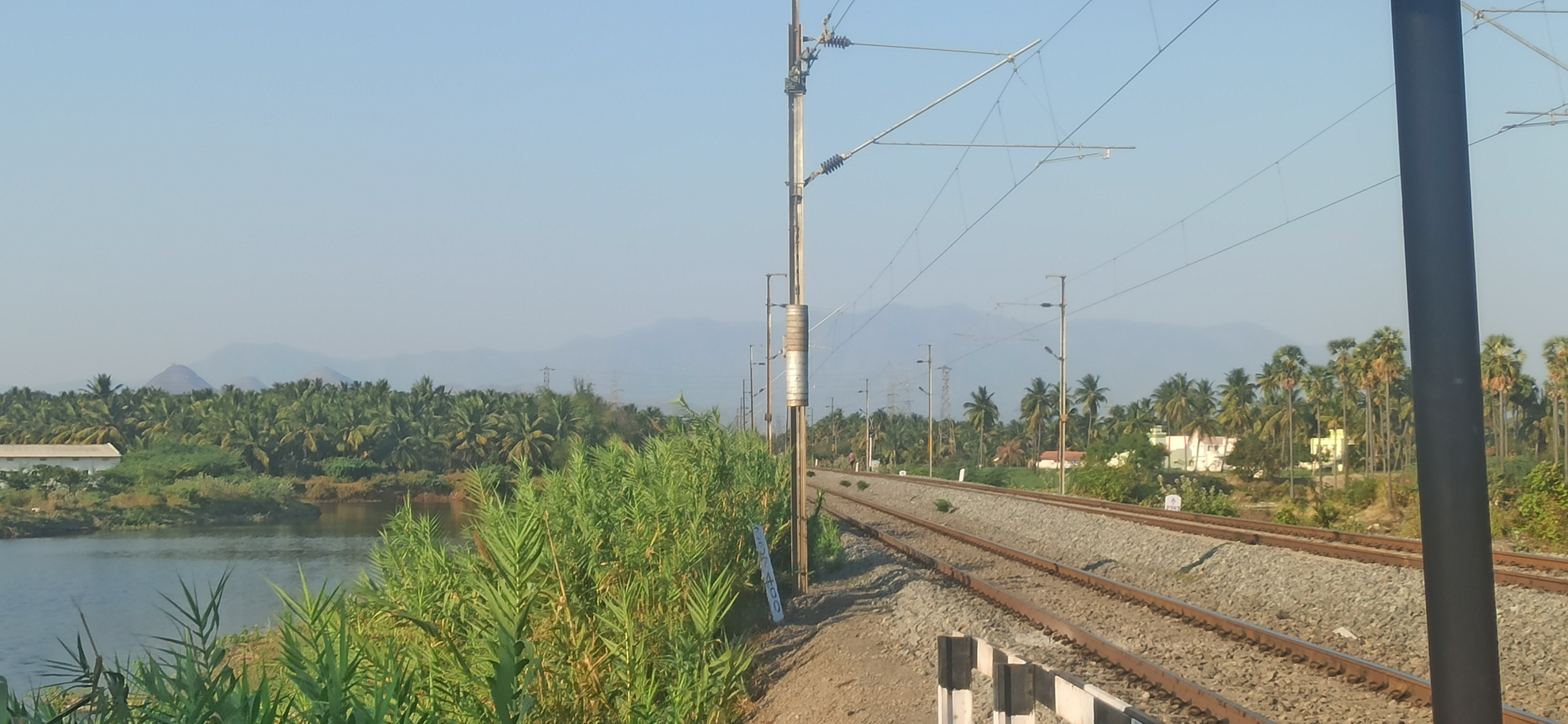
- Railway Track at Miyana

- Location in Madhya Pradesh, India
- Coordinates: 24.85°N 77.47°E
- Country: India
- State: Madhya Pradesh
- Division: Gwalior
- District: Guna
- PIN: 473113

Miyana is a town in the Guna District of Madhya Pradesh, India. It is located along NH46 and has a PIN code of 473113. It has an average elevation of 419 m (1,375 ft). It is a station on the Indore–Gwalior railway root.

As per Census of India 2011 Miyana town has population of 8,247 of which 4,285 are males while 3,962 are females.

Basic facilities like school, bank, hospital, police station, railway station, market, post office are available here.
