= Mamta Meena =

Indian politician (born 1976)

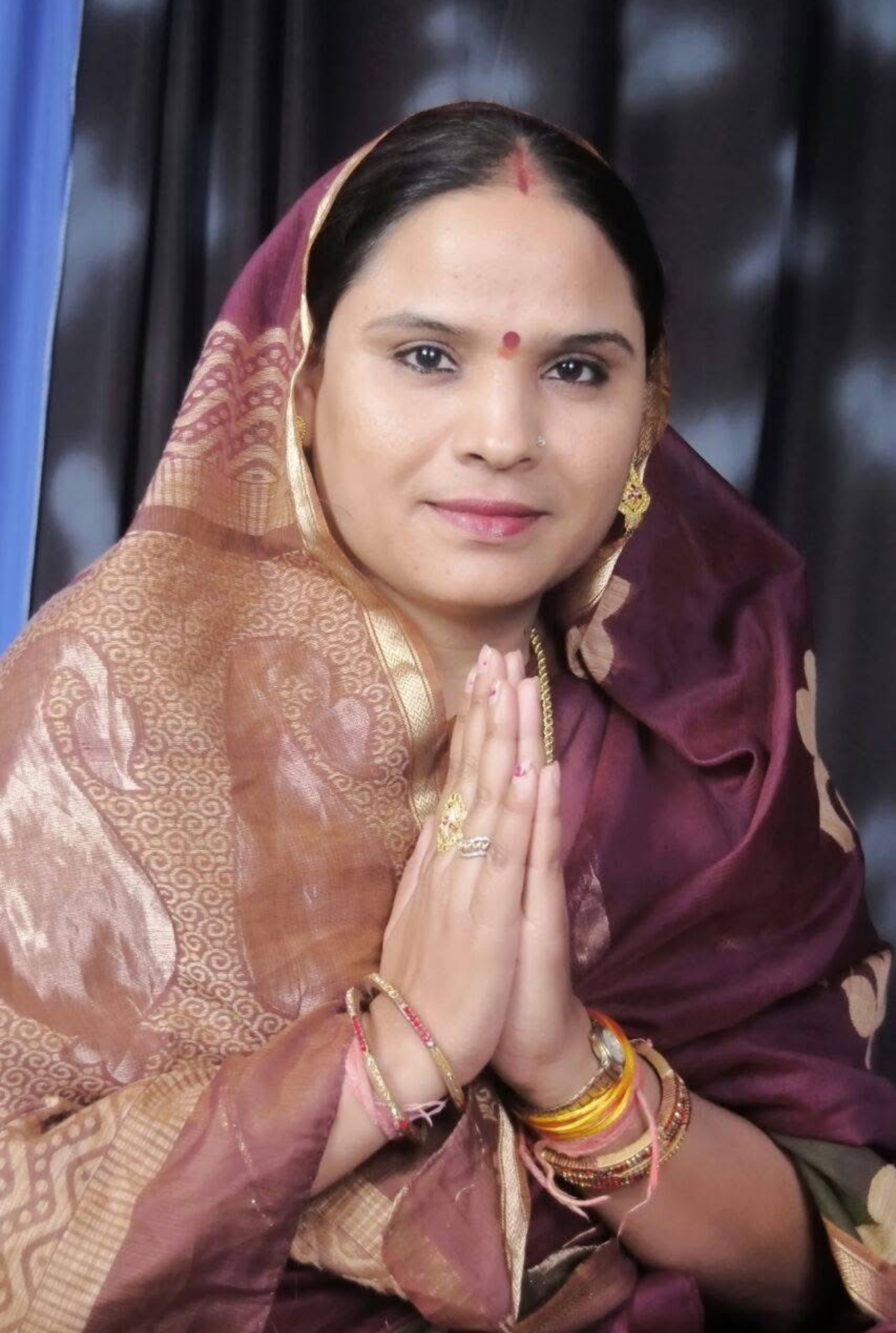

Member of Madhya Pradesh Legislative Assembly
- In office 2013–2018
- Preceded by: Shivnarayan Meena
- Succeeded by: Lakshman Singh
- Constituency: Chachoura

Chairman, Zila Panchayat District Guna Madhya Pradesh
- In office 2005–2010
- Preceded by: Mool Singh
- Succeeded by: Sumer Singh Garha

Personal details
- Born: 4 April 1976 (age 50) Vill.Badodiya, Tehsil Chachaura, Guna, Madhya Pradesh
- Party: Aam Aadmi Party (2023–present)
- Other political affiliations: Bharatiya Janata Party (2003–2023)
- Spouse(s): Raghuveer Singh Meena, IPS (retd.)
- Children: 2 sons, 2 daughters
- Profession: Politician, Agriculturist
- Website: mpvidhansabha.nic.in/14thvs/2014_30.pdf

Mamta Raghuveer Singh Meena (born 4 April 1976) is an Indian politician from Madhya Pradesh. She previously served as the Member of the Madhya Pradesh Legislative Assembly from 2013 to 2018, representing the Bharatiya Janata Party from the Chachoura Assembly constituency.

== Personal life ==
Mamta Meena was born in Chachaura, Guna district, Madhya Pradesh. She is married to Raghuveer Singh Meena, a retired Indian Police Service (IPS) officer.

== Political career ==
Mamta Meena served as the Chairperson of the Zila Panchayat, Guna from 2005 to 2010.

In the 2013 election, she was elected to the Madhya Pradesh Legislative Assembly, representing the Bharatiya Janata Party from the Chachoura constituency. She secured 82,779 votes, defeating the incumbent INC candidate Shivnarayan Meena with a margin of 34,901 votes.

She resigned from the Bharatiya Janata Party on being denied the ticket for the Chachoura constituency in Guna for the 2023 Madhya Pradesh Legislative Assembly election. She later joined the Aam Aadmi Party on 20 September 2023, and contested the election representing AAP.
