= Taravata railway station =

Railway station in Madhya Pradesh, India

Taravata

General information
- Location: Kanja, Taravata, Guna district, Madhya Pradesh; India
- Coordinates: 24°44′46″N 77°22′53″E
- Elevation: 504 m (1,654 ft)
- System: Passenger train station
- Owner: Indian Railways
- Operator: West Central Railway
- Line: Indore–Gwalior line
- Platforms: 1
- Tracks: 1

Construction
- Structure type: Standard (on ground station)

Other information
- Status: Active
- Station code: TRWT
- Zone(s): West Central Railway zone
- Division(s): Bhopal

History
- Opened: 1899
- Former names: Gwalior Light Railway

Services
| Preceding station | Indian Railways | Following station |
|---|---|---|
| Bhadora Jagir towards ? | West Central Railway zone Indore–Gwalior line | Guna Junction towards ? |
Location

Taravata railway station is a railway station on Indore–Gwalior line under the Bhopal railway division of West Central Railway zone. This is situated at Kanja, Taravata in Guna district of the Indian state of Madhya Pradesh.
