= Bajrangarh Fort =

Coordinates: 24°35′9″N 77°17′34″E

- Fort
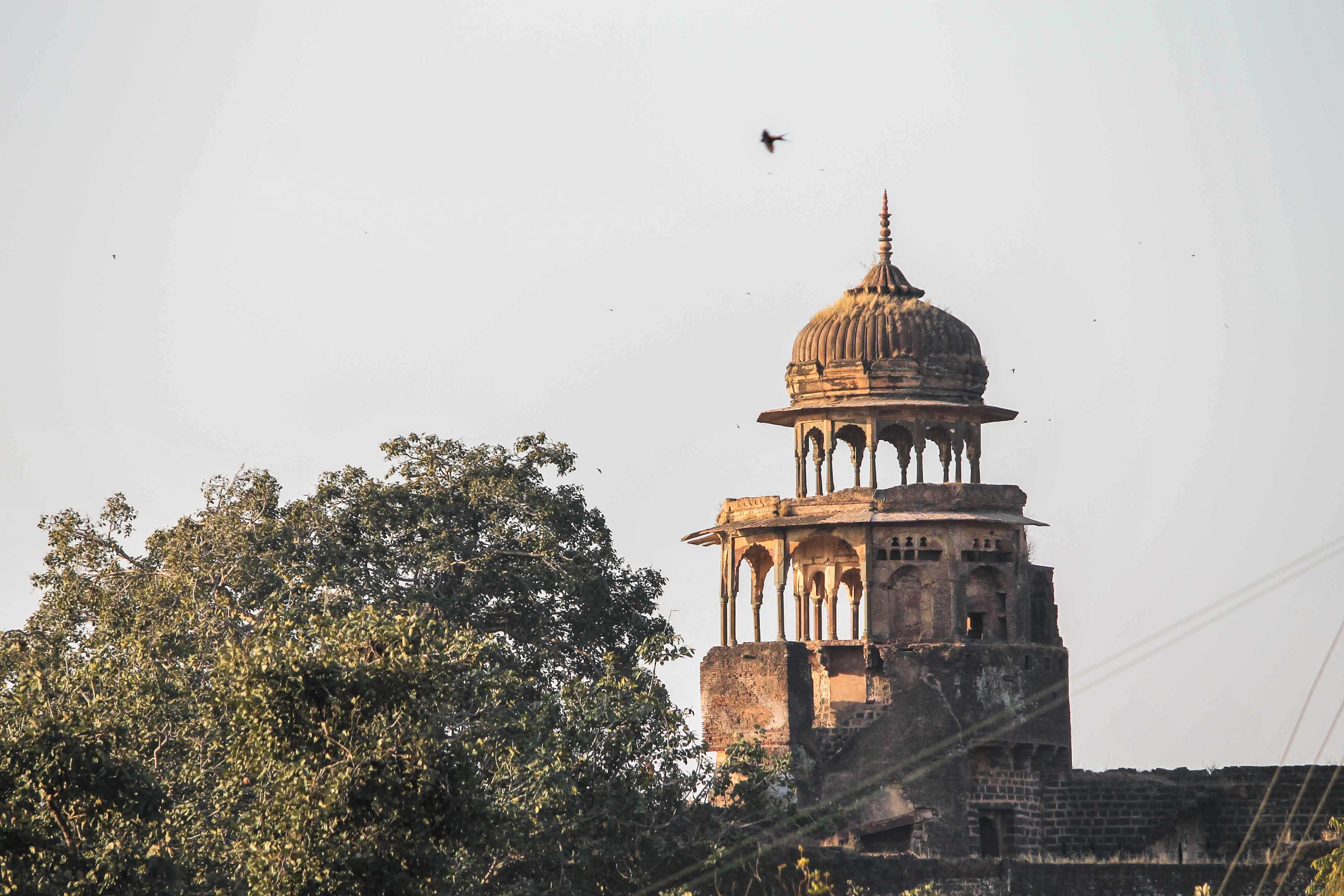
- Bajrangarh Fort

- Location within Madhya Pradesh
- Country: India
- State: Madhya Pradesh
- Region: Gwalior
- District: Guna
- Established: 14th–16th century

Government
- Elevation: 477 m (1,565 ft)

Languages
  - Official: Hindi,
- Time zone: UTC+5:30 (IST)
- PIN: 473249
- Telephone code: 07542

Bajrangarh Fort (also known as Jharkon) is located in Bajranggarh village of Guna District in the Indian state of Madhya Pradesh.

The Bajrangarh fort lies at an altitude of 92.3 metres (303 feet) and is in ruins. The fort is about 10 kilometres (6.2 miles) from Guna on Guna to Aron road on the bank of Chapet river around 8 kilometres (5.0 miles) south-west of Guna city. It spreads over 72 bighas of land on a high hill. It was the headquarters of a mahal of the Chanderi Sarkar. During the reign of Raja Jai Singh, Daulatrao Scindia sent his General, John Baptiste to attack the fort in 1816 A.D. Raja Jai Singh was defeated and the fort was destroyed. The Bajrangarh fort had four gates in four directions. Inside the fort, Moti Mahal, Rangmahal, Ram Mandir, and Bajrang Mandir are still intact.

There is a big step well inside the complex that was used for storing drinking water for the horses. The fort also has an ancient temple which is frequented by local inhabitants. It is believed to have been constructed by Ahir ruler Jainarayan Singh who migrated from Alwar, Ahirwal.

== Geography ==
The fort is about 10 kilometres (6.2 mi) from Guna on Guna to Aron road on the bank of Chapet river around 8 kilometres (5.0 mi) south-west of Guna city. It spreads over 72 bighas of land on a high hill.

== Precincts ==
The Bajrangarh fort (Nandvanshi Ahir fort) had four gates in four directions. Inside the fort, Moti Mahal, Rangmahal, Ram Mandir, and Bajrang Mandir are still intact.

There is a big step well inside the complex that was used for storing drinking water for the horses. The fort also has an ancient temple that is frequented by local inhabitants.

== See also ==
- Champavati Fort
- Dhiraj Singh (Khichi)
