= Birhai =

- village
- Location within Madhya Pradesh Location within India
- Coordinates: 23.625293°N 77.404838°E
- Country: India
- State: Madhya Pradesh
- District: Bhopal
- Tehsil: Berasia

Population (2011)
  - Total: 85
- Time zone: UTC+5:30 (IST)
- ISO 3166 code: MP-IN
- Census code: 482232

Birhai is a village in the Bhopal district of Madhya Pradesh, India. It is located in the Berasia tehsil. It is located on the Guna-Bhopal road.

== Demographics ==
According to the 2011 census of India, Birhai has 14 households. The effective literacy rate (i.e. the literacy rate of population excluding children aged 6 and below) is 50%.

Demographics (2011 Census)
	Total	Male	Female
Population	85	41	44
Children aged below 6 years	13	5	8
Scheduled caste	19	8	11
Scheduled tribe	0	0	0
Literates	36	20	16
Workers (all)	43	20	23
Main workers (total)	13	11	2
Main workers: Cultivators	13	11	2
Main workers: Agricultural labourers	0	0	0
Main workers: Household industry workers	0	0	0
Main workers: Other	0	0	0
Marginal workers (total)	30	9	21
Marginal workers: Cultivators	0	0	0
Marginal workers: Agricultural labourers	30	9	21
Marginal workers: Household industry workers	0	0	0
Marginal workers: Others	0	0	0
Non-workers	42	21	21
