= Kherkhedi =

- village
- Location within Madhya Pradesh Location within India
- Coordinates: 23.813665°N 77.247329°E
- Country: India
- State: Madhya Pradesh
- District: Bhopal
- Tehsil: Berasia

Population (2011)
  - Total: 407
- Time zone: UTC+5:30 (IST)
- ISO 3166 code: MP-IN
- Census code: 482055

Kherkhedi is a village in the Bhopal district of Madhya Pradesh, India. It is located in the Berasia tehsil, on the Guna-Bhopal road.

== Demographics ==
According to the 2011 census of India, Kherkhedi has 80 households. The effective literacy rate (i.e. the literacy rate of population excluding children aged 6 and below) is 70.31%.

Demographics (2011 Census)
	Total	Male	Female
Population	407	210	197
Children aged below 6 years	50	22	28
Scheduled caste	199	99	100
Scheduled tribe	0	0	0
Literates	251	155	96
Workers (all)	220	118	102
Main workers (total)	208	113	95
Main workers: Cultivators	201	110	91
Main workers: Agricultural labourers	2	1	1
Main workers: Household industry workers	1	0	1
Main workers: Other	4	2	2
Marginal workers (total)	12	5	7
Marginal workers: Cultivators	11	4	7
Marginal workers: Agricultural labourers	0	0	0
Marginal workers: Household industry workers	1	1	0
Marginal workers: Others	0	0	0
Non-workers	187	92	95
