= Dhiraj Singh (Khichi) =

Ruler of Raghogarh State

- Raja
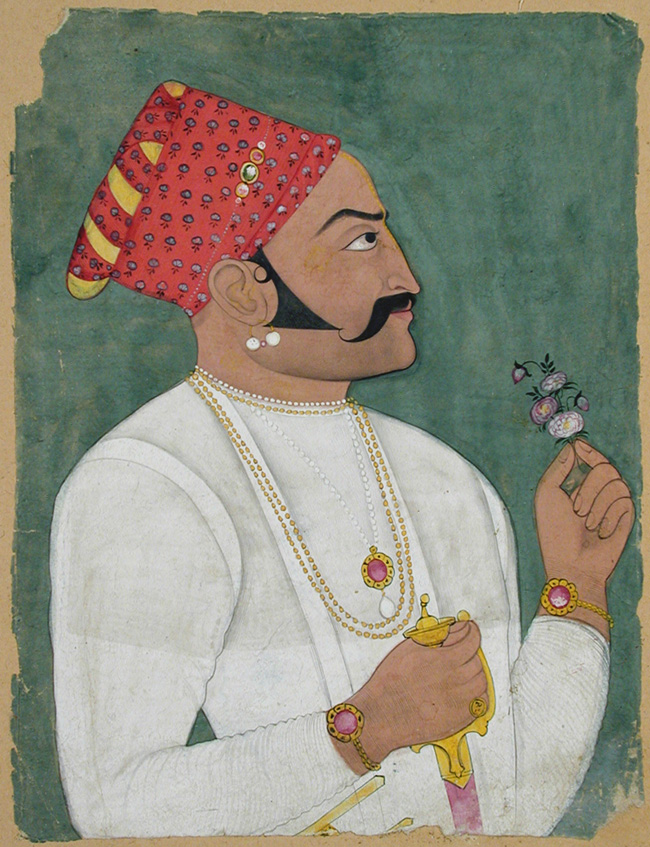
- Raja Dhiraj Singh (Khichi) of Raghogarh

Raja of Raghogarh
- Predecessor: Lal Singh
- Successor: Gaj Singh
- Born: 1697
- Died: 1726 (aged 28–29)
- Issue: Gaj Singh
- Father: Lal Singh

Raja Dhiraj Singh (1697–1726) was 2nd ruler of Raghogarh State, who belonged to the Khichi clan of Chauhans Rajput. He was the son of Raja Lal Singh, who founded Raghogarh at its zenith. Dhiraj Singh was a great patron of art and music.

He also built several temples in his reign. He also fought alongside Jai Singh of Amber; who was one of his best supporters of his ideas and actions. He was a charitable ruler who was generous towards: Brahmanas, Bhats, Bairagis and Charans.

== See also ==
- Raghogarh State
- Chauhan Dynasty
- Battle of Pilsud
- Bajrangarh Fort
- Ahirwara
- Jaivardhan Singh
