= Bajranggarh =

Town in Guna District of Madhya Pradesh

- Town
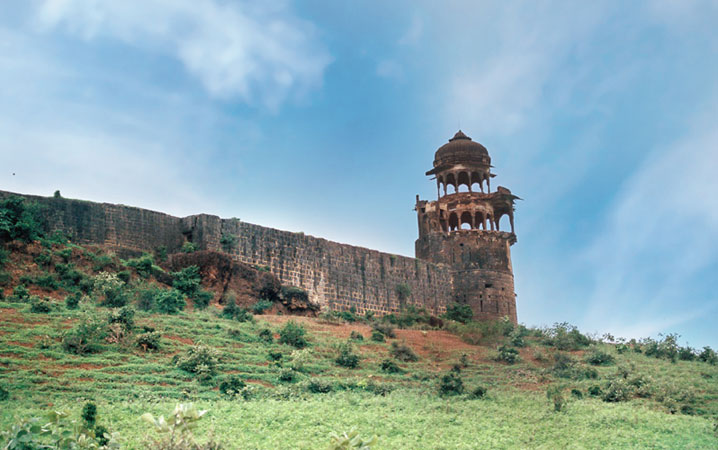
- The fort of Bajrangarh

- Location in Madhya Pradesh, India
- Coordinates: 24.57°N 77.28°E
- Country: India
- State: Madhya Pradesh
- Division: Gwalior
- District: Guna
- PIN: 473249

Bajranggarh is a town and a Gram Panchayat in Guna District of Madhya Pradesh, India. It is approximately 8 km away from Guna.

It has an average elevation of 419 m (1,375 ft). The town includes a historic fort and some Jain temples. The PIN code of Bajrangarh is 473249.

As per Census of India 2011, the town has a population of 7,955 of which 4,110 are males while 3,845 are females.
