= Guna, India =

City in Madhya Pradesh, India

Guna
- City
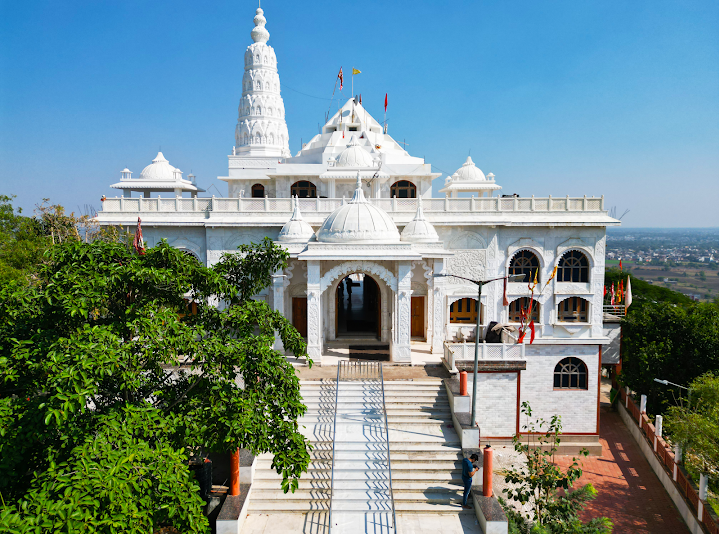
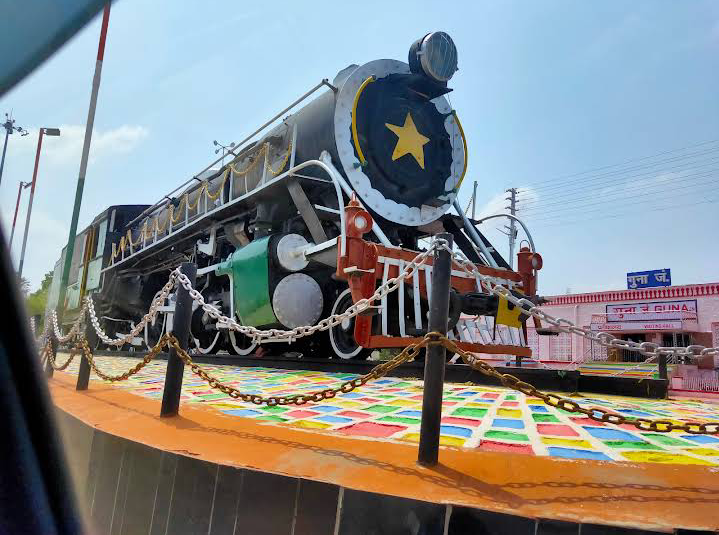
- Tekri Sarkar Hanuman Mandir Guna Junction Railway Station

- Location in Madhya Pradesh, India Guna (India)
- Coordinates: 24.65°N 77.32°E
- Country: India
- State: Madhya Pradesh
- District: Guna
- Region: Gwalior Chambal
- Division: Gwalior
- Founder: Scindia Dynasty

Area
  - Total: 84 km^{2} (32 sq mi)
- Elevation: 474 m (1,555 ft)

Population (2011)
  - Total: 180,935
  - Density: 2,155/km^{2} (5,580/sq mi)

Language
  - Official: Hindi, Bundeli
- Time zone: UTC+5:30 (IST)
- Pin code: 473001
- Telephone code: 07542
- ISO 3166 code: IN-MP
- Vehicle registration: MP-08
- Website: guna.nic.in

Guna is a city and a municipality in Guna district in the Indian state of Madhya Pradesh. It is the administrative headquarters of Guna District under Gwalior Division and is located on the banks of Parbati river.

Guna was historically part of the ancient Avanti Kingdom, which was ruled by King Chand Pradyota Mahasena. In later periods, the region came under the influence of the expanding Magadha Empire.

During the pre-independence era, Guna was part of the Gwalior State . Initially, the district headquarters was located at Issagarh, which was the former name of the district. In 1909, administrative reorganization led to the shifting of the district headquarters from Issagarh to Bajranggarh, then a tehsil town.

On 5 November 1922, Guna was designated as the district headquarters, as it offered better infrastructural facilities compared to Bajranggarh. The town had already gained importance due to its location on the historic Agra–Bombay road and the railway line constructed in 1897 by the Midland Railway.

In the modern period, the establishment of National Fertilizers Limited at Vijaypur near Guna has contributed to the region’s industrial development. Additionally, a station of All India Radio was inaugurated in Guna on 10 April 1993.

== Geography ==
Guna is located at 24.65°N 77.32°E. It has an average elevation of 474 metres (1555 ft).

== Climate ==
Climate data for Guna (1991–2020, extremes 1932–2020)
Month	Jan	Feb	Mar	Apr	May	Jun	Jul	Aug	Sep	Oct	Nov	Dec	Year
Record high °C (°F)	33.5 (92.3)	37.8 (100.0)	42.0 (107.6)	45.8 (114.4)	47.8 (118.0)	46.8 (116.2)	43.0 (109.4)	39.2 (102.6)	39.5 (103.1)	39.3 (102.7)	37.0 (98.6)	32.9 (91.2)	47.8 (118.0)
Mean daily maximum °C (°F)	24.4 (75.9)	27.9 (82.2)	33.7 (92.7)	39.0 (102.2)	42.0 (107.6)	39.0 (102.2)	32.3 (90.1)	30.2 (86.4)	32.3 (90.1)	33.6 (92.5)	30.3 (86.5)	26.9 (80.4)	32.6 (90.7)
Daily mean °C (°F)	16.5 (61.7)	20.1 (68.2)	25.4 (77.7)	30.7 (87.3)	34.3 (93.7)	32.2 (90.0)	27.9 (82.2)	26.5 (79.7)	27.5 (81.5)	26.2 (79.2)	22.0 (71.6)	18.1 (64.6)	25.6 (78.1)
Mean daily minimum °C (°F)	9.0 (48.2)	11.9 (53.4)	16.8 (62.2)	22.0 (71.6)	26.3 (79.3)	26.5 (79.7)	24.3 (75.7)	23.3 (73.9)	22.5 (72.5)	18.8 (65.8)	14.2 (57.6)	10.0 (50.0)	18.6 (65.5)
Record low °C (°F)	−2.2 (28.0)	−1.1 (30.0)	4.7 (40.5)	10.5 (50.9)	16.7 (62.1)	18.2 (64.8)	19.1 (66.4)	19.4 (66.9)	13.1 (55.6)	8.3 (46.9)	2.8 (37.0)	−1.7 (28.9)	−2.2 (28.0)
Average rainfall mm (inches)	6.6 (0.26)	12.2 (0.48)	8.1 (0.32)	4.7 (0.19)	10.8 (0.43)	99.8 (3.93)	360.4 (14.19)	327.1 (12.88)	146.8 (5.78)	19.3 (0.76)	9.3 (0.37)	3.6 (0.14)	1,008.5 (39.70)
Average rainy days	0.7	0.9	0.8	0.6	1.1	5.6	13.9	13.6	6.9	1.3	0.6	0.5	46.4
Average relative humidity (%) (at 17:30 IST)	42	34	25	19	21	43	72	79	65	42	42	44	44
Source 1: India Meteorological Department
Source 2: Tokyo Climate Center (mean temperatures 1991–2020)

== Demographics ==
As of 2011 Indian Census, Guna had a total population of 180,935, of which 94,464 were males and 86,471 were females. Population within the age group of 0 to 6 years was 24,447. The total number of literates in Guna was 125,295, which constituted 69.2% of the population with male literacy of 75.3% and female literacy of 62.6%. The effective literacy rate of 7+ population of Guna was 80.1%, of which male literacy rate was 87.2% and female literacy rate was 72.3%. The Scheduled Castes and Scheduled Tribes population was 27,631 and 3,623 respectively. Guna had 34383 households in 2011.

As of 2001 India census, Guna has a population of 137,132. Males constitute 52.8% of the population and females 47.2%. Total number of literates was 91,322, giving a crude literacy rate 66.6% and an effective literacy rate of 78.4%. In Guna, a population of 20,648 (15%) was in the age range of 0–6 years.

== Government and Administration ==
Guna Municipality is part of Guna Assembly constituency. Guna Assembly constituency is one of the 230 Vidhan Sabha (Legislative Assembly) constituencies of Madhya Pradesh. Panna Lal Shakya is representative of the assembly. Guna is part of Guna Lok Sabha constituency.

- Civil Administration

Guna is a Municipality City. Guna city is divided into 37 wards for which elections are held every 5 years. Guna Municipality has total administration over 34,383 houses to which it supplies basic amenities like water and sewerage.

== Notable sites ==
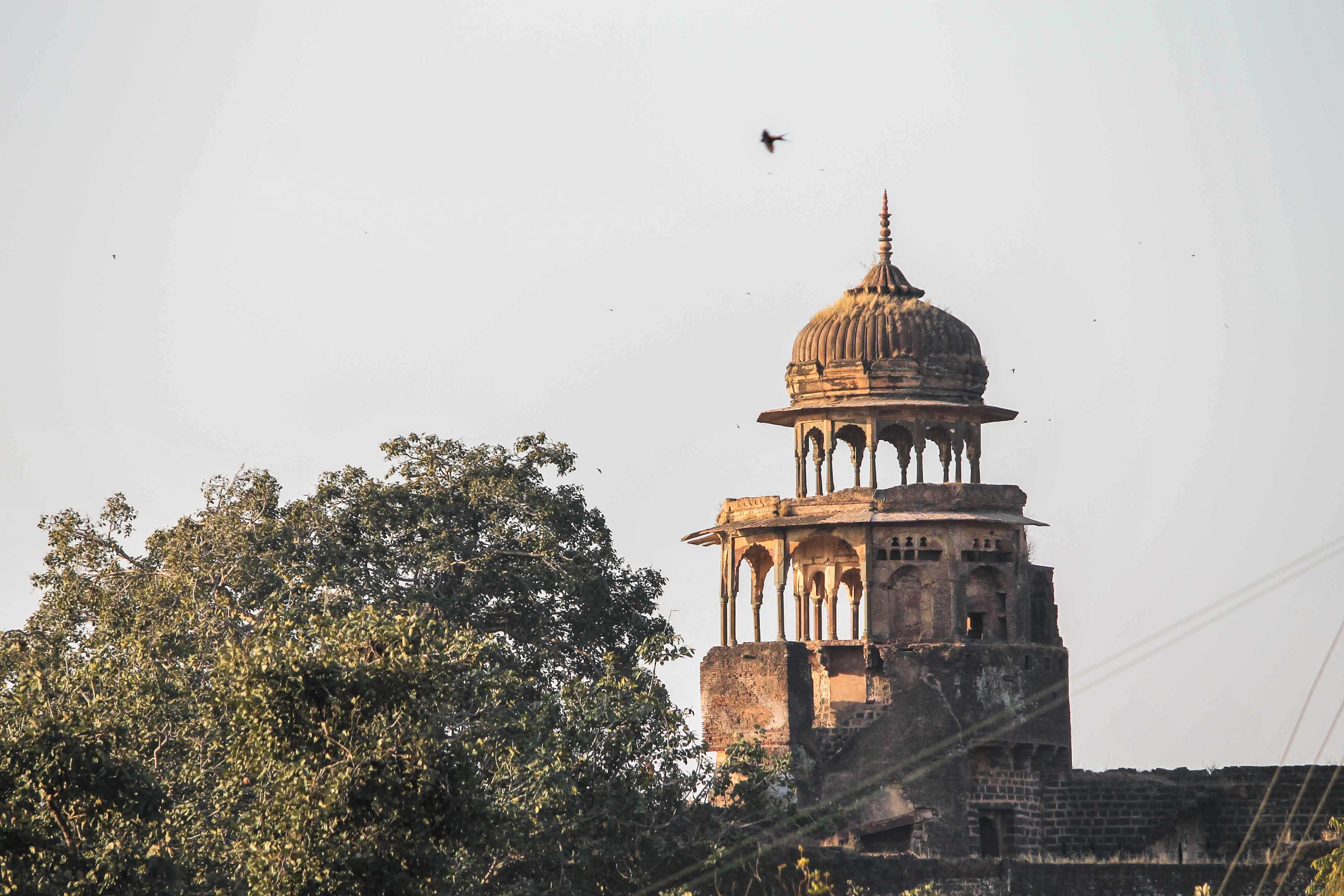
Bajrangarh fort

- Bajrangarh Fort - The Fort is a Historical place and a tourist destination. It's 8 km away from City. The Bajrangarh fort (Nandvanshi Ahir fort) had four gates in four directions. Inside the fort, Moti Mahal, Rangmahal, Ram Mandir, and Bajrang Mandir are still intact.
- Tekri Sarkar Temple - Tekri Sarkar is a Hindu temple dedicated to Lord Hanuman, it is a major center of faith and a tourist destination.
- Beesbhuja Devi Temple - Bisbhuji Temple has a special idol of Bisbhuja Devi with 20 arms. It is a very religious place. The Goddess is said to have 20 arms and hence the name 20 Bhuja Devi. Chaturthi is a form of Goddess Maa Durga, hence the occasion of Durgashtami is very popular and is celebrated with much pomp in the city. It's 8 km away from City.

== Transportation ==
Guna Junction railway station is Major railway station of the city, Many Superfast, Express and Passenger train halts here. Its code is GUNA. It serves Guna city. The station consists of three platforms.

Guna Junction is well connected to major parts of the state as well as country such as Delhi, Mumbai, Kota, Pune, Bhopal, Indore, Jabalpur, Gwalior, Chennai, Kolkata, Ajmer, Agra, Jaipur etc. It is one of the busiest and major stations in the state.
