= Aron, Madhya Pradesh =

Aron aaron
- Town
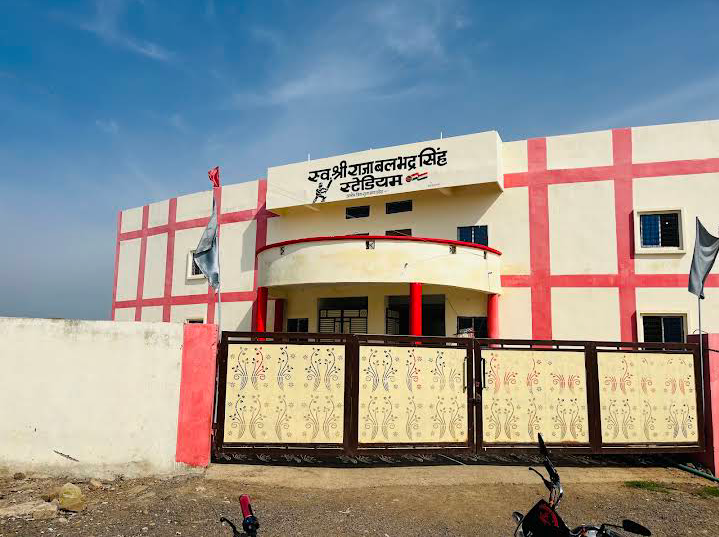
- A Stadium in Aaron

- Location in Madhya Pradesh, India Aron (India)
- Coordinates: 24.38°N 77.42°E
- Country: India
- State: Madhya Pradesh
- District: Guna
- Elevation: 505 m (1,657 ft)

Population (2011)
  - Total: 28,018

Languages
  - Official: Hindi
- Time zone: UTC+5:30 (IST)
- Postal code: 473101
- ISO 3166 code: IN-MP
- Vehicle registration: MP

Aron is a town and a nagar panchayat in Guna district in the state of Madhya Pradesh, India.

== Geography ==
Aron is located at 24.38°N 77.42°E. It has an average elevation of 505 metres (1656 feet). It is 36 km from guna and have single farm science centre of the district.

== Demographics ==
As of 2011 India census, Aron had a population of 28,018. Males constitute 53% of the population and females 47%. Aron has an average literacy rate of 51%, lower than the national average of 59.5%; with 62% of the males and 38% of females literate. 18% of the population is under 6 years of age.
