= Kashigaon =

Village in Maharashtra

Kashigaon Kashimira
- City
- Location within Maharashtra Location within India
- Coordinates: 19°16′17.004″N 72°53′27.0348″E
- Country: India
- State: Maharashtra
- District: Thane

Languages
  - Official: Marathi
- Time zone: UTC+5:30 (IST)
- PIN: 401107
- Vehicle registration: MH-04

Kashigaon is a town located on Ghodbunder Road in Maharashtra, India. It is now part of Thane. It has a history of rich culture and heritage consisting of different religions and castes like Bhandaris, Koli Christians, Agri, and Konkani Muslims. St. Jerome Church, Jarimari Gaondevi Mandir, Vitthal Rukmini Mandir, Gaondev Vithoba Temple, and Durga Mata Temple are just a few of the town's historic temples and churches. In the last eight years, numerous new residential and commercial projects have been finished, contributing to the region's enormous population boom.

== Population and demographics ==
As of 2020, the population of Kashigaon is 12,378, consisting of 6,612 males and 5,766 females. The population density currently is 11,476 people per km².

Males and females aged 25–29 comprise most of the population, with more than 600 people in the age group, followed closely by males and females aged 20–24.
