= Chachaura tehsil =

Tehsil in Madhya Pradesh, India

Chachaura Tehsil
- Tehsil
- (Chachaura tehsil in Madhya Pradesh, India) Chachaura Tehsil (India)
- Coordinates: 24°10′54″N 77°00′29″E
- Country: India
- State: Madhya Pradesh
- Division: Gwalior
- District: Guna
- Lok Sabha constituency: Rajgarh
- Vidhansabha Constituency: Chachoura

Government
  - Type: Janpad Panchayat
  - Body: Council

Area
  - Tehsil: 607.7 km^{2} (234.6 sq mi)
  - Urban: 11.65 km^{2} (4.50 sq mi)
  - Rural: 596.05 km^{2} (230.14 sq mi)

Population (2011)
  - Tehsil: 127,388
  - Density: 209.6/km^{2} (543/sq mi)
  - Urban: 21,860
  - Urban density: 1,876/km^{2} (4,860/sq mi)
  - Rural: 105,528
  - Rural density: 177/km^{2} (460/sq mi)

Languages
  - Official: Hindi
- Time zone: UTC+5:30 (IST)
- Postal code (PIN): 473118
- Area code: 07546
- ISO 3166 code: IN-MP
- Vehicle registration: MP08
- No. of Villages: 150

Chachaura tehsil is a tehsil in Guna district of Madhya Pradesh, India. It is a subdivision of the administrative and revenue division in Guna district of Madhya Pradesh.

== Demography (As of 2011 census) ==
There are around 25,459 households in the Chachaura tehsil, including 4,011 urban households and 21,448 rural households. Out of total population 1,27,388, male population are 66,703 and female population are 60,685. Literacy rate of Chachaura tehsil is 50.57%, out of which 60.70% males and 39.43% females are literate.

Religions in Chachaura tehsil (2011)
Religion	Percent
Hinduism	97.68%
Islam	1.76%
Jainism	0.41%
Other or not stated	0.15%

== See also ==
- Champavati Fort
- Chachoura
