= Maksoodangarh =

Town in Madhya Pradesh, India

Madhusudangarh
- Town
- Location in Madhya Pradesh, India

Maksodangarh is a town and nagar panchayat in Guna district of Madhya Pradesh, India.

== Population ==
The Maksudangarh village has population of 10917 of which 5688 are males while 5229 are females as per Population Census 2011.

== Description ==
Maksudangarh is also a tehsil headquarter. Maksudangarh is 77 km away from guna. Parvati river flows near the Town.
