= Champavati Fort =

Fort in Chachaura, Madhya Pradesh, India

Champavati Fort Chachaura Fort
- Fort
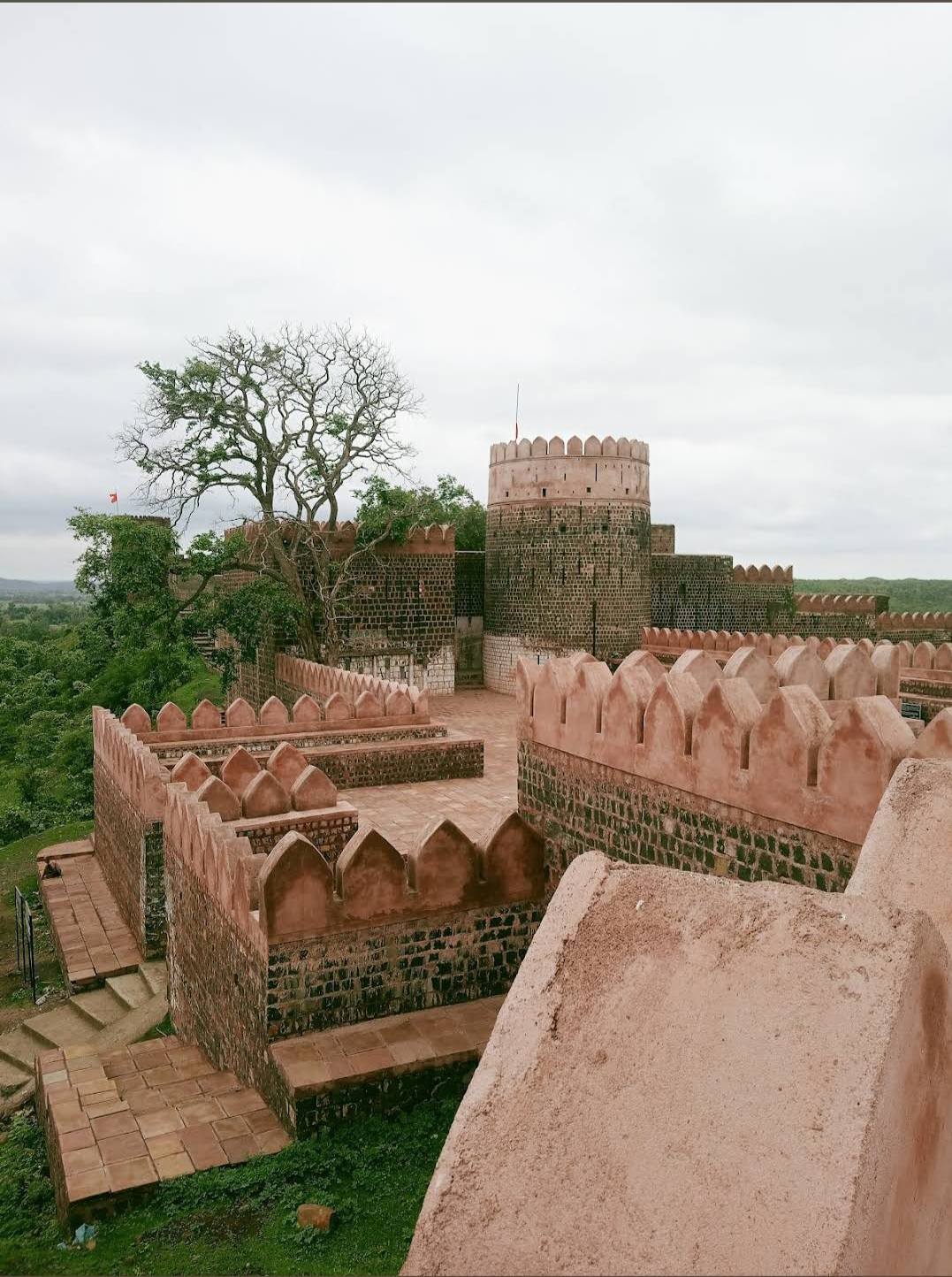

- (Champavati Fort in Chachaura, Madhya Pradesh, India) Champavati Fort (India)
- Coordinates: 24°10′36″N 76°59′46″E
- Country: India
- State: Madhya Pradesh
- Region: Gwalior
- District: Guna
- Tehsil: Chachaura
- Established: 17th Century
- Elevation: 510 m (1,670 ft)

Languages
  - Official: Hindi
- Time zone: UTC+5:30 (IST)
- PIN: 473118
- Area code: 07546

Champavati Fort (also known as Chachaura Fort) is in the city of Chachaura in the Guna district of Madhya Pradesh, India.

== History ==
The fort was built in the 17th century, by Raja ("king") Vikram Singh of the Khinchi dynasty of the Chachouda princely state, and named for his wife Rani ("queen") Champavati. After the British attacked the fort, under army officer John Bettis (or Botis), the King was killed, and rather than submit to the British, the Queen jumped into a 50-metre (160 ft) deep well, sacrificing her life.

The fort has been conserved and restored by the Madhya Pradesh state archaeology department. It is the first preserved fort in the state which is also named for a woman.

The fort is 1 hectare (2.5 acres) in area and is located on a hilltop overlooking the city. It has high fortification walls and strong bastions. The inner courtyard was used for residence and the outer courtyard was used for official work.

== See also ==
- List of forts in Madhya Pradesh
- Chachoura
- Chachaura district
