= Gird, India =

Region of Madhya Pradesh, India

Coordinates: 26°12′N 78°12′E

Historical Region of North India; Gird
Location	Northern Madhya Pradesh
19th-century flag
State established:	5th century
Language	Southern Bundeli dialect of Hindi
Dynasties	Gupta Empire (4th century CE-401) Hunas (401–500) Kacchapghata (900–1100) Delhi Sultanate (1200–1400) Tomaras (1400–1526) Mughals(1526–1725) Jats (1725–1735) Scindia Marathas (1740–1948)
Historical capitals	Gwalior; Gohad

Gird (also known as Gopasetra in ancient times, or Gwalior region later) is a region of the Madhya Pradesh state in central India. In ancient time this region was known as Gopashetra roughly translate to "the land of Gopis" or "the land associated to Cowherds". The name is believed to have connections with the Gopis (the cow herdesses or cowherds girls) of the Lord Krishna mythology. It is said that the area was once inhabited by cowherds and associated with pastoral activities, especially in the times of Mahabharata. This may refer to the cultural or historical ties with Lord Krishna worship, which had an influence on the region.

It includes the districts of Bhind, Gwalior, Morena, Sheopur, and Shivpuri. Gwalior is the largest city in the region, and its historic center.

The Chambal and Yamuna rivers form the northwestern and northern boundaries of the region. Hadoti region of Rajasthan lies to the southwest, Malwa region of Madhya Pradesh lies to the south, Bundelkhand region of Madhya Pradesh and Uttar Pradesh lies to the east and Braj region of Uttar Pradesh lies to the North.

The local language of the local tribes of gird region is Bundeli.

== Geography ==
The region is semi-arid characterized by black less fertile soil, rainfall of 200 to 300 mm/year, and winter temperatures that sometimes drop below 5 degrees Celsius. Major crops in the region include soya bean, gram, and wheat and under-assured irrigation, and guava, ber, aonla, and custardapple.
