= Kumbhraj =

- Town
- Location in Madhya Pradesh, India Kumbhraj (India)
- Coordinates: 24.37°N 77.05°E
- Country: India
- State: Madhya Pradesh
- District: Guna
- Elevation: 419 m (1,375 ft)

Population (2001)
  - Total: 14,055

Languages
  - Official: Hindi
- Time zone: UTC+5:30 (IST)
- ISO 3166 code: IN-MP
- Vehicle registration: MP

Kumbhraj is a town in Guna district in the Indian state of Madhya Pradesh. Kumbhraj is one of the largest producer of coriander seeds in the world. Many multinational companies like Tata procure coriander seeds from Kumbhraj. Kumbhraj name is given by Rana Kumbha.

== Demographics ==
As of 2001 India census, Kumbhraj had a population of 14,055. Males constitute 52% of the population and females 48%. Kumbhraj has an average literacy rate of 57%, lower than the national average of 59.5%: male literacy is 67%, and female literacy is 45%. In Kumbhraj, 18% of the population is under 6 years of age. Kumbhraj city is famous for coriander.

== Geography ==
Kumbhraj is located at the bank of river Parvati at24.37°N 77.05°E. It has an average elevation of 419 metres (1,374 feet).

== Transportation ==
Kumbhraj railway station is situated on Indore–Gwalior line under the Bhopal railway division. The nearest airport is Gwalior.
