= Gwalior division =

Division of Madhya Pradesh, India

Coordinates: 26.2333°N 78.1667°E

Map of Gwalior division

Gwalior Division is an administrative subdivision of Madhya Pradesh state in central India. It includes the districts of Ashoknagar, Guna, Datia, Gwalior, and Shivpuri. The historic city of Gwalior is the administrative headquarters of the division.

Gwalior and Chambal divisions correspond to the Gird region of Madhya Pradesh, which is mostly a level agricultural plain, dotted with ranges of low hills. The divisions include the northern, contiguous portion of the former princely state of Gwalior together with the former princely state of Datia; the non-contiguous southern portions of the former state of Gwalior are currently part of Bhopal, Indore and Ujjain divisions.
