= Guna district =

- District
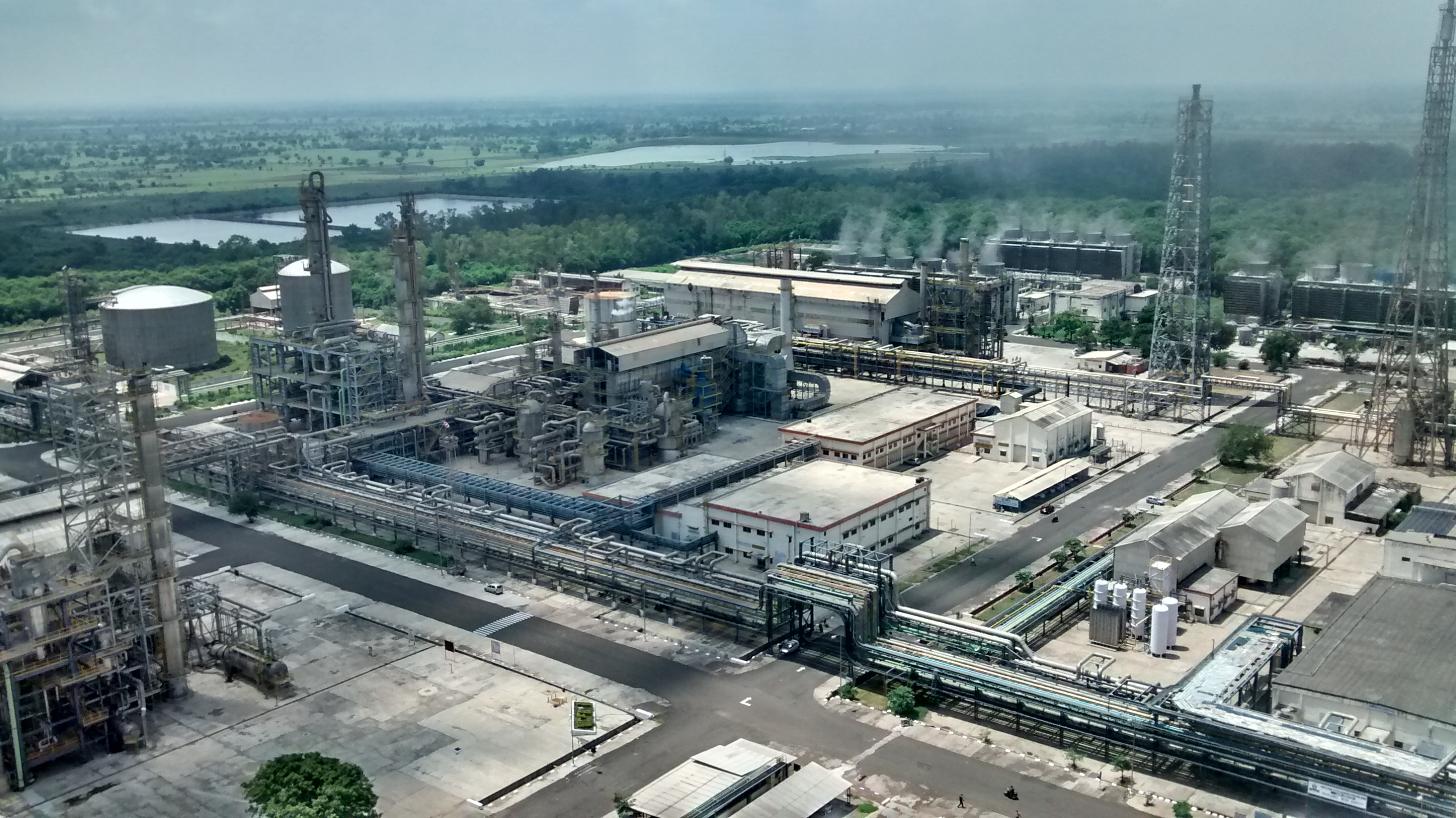
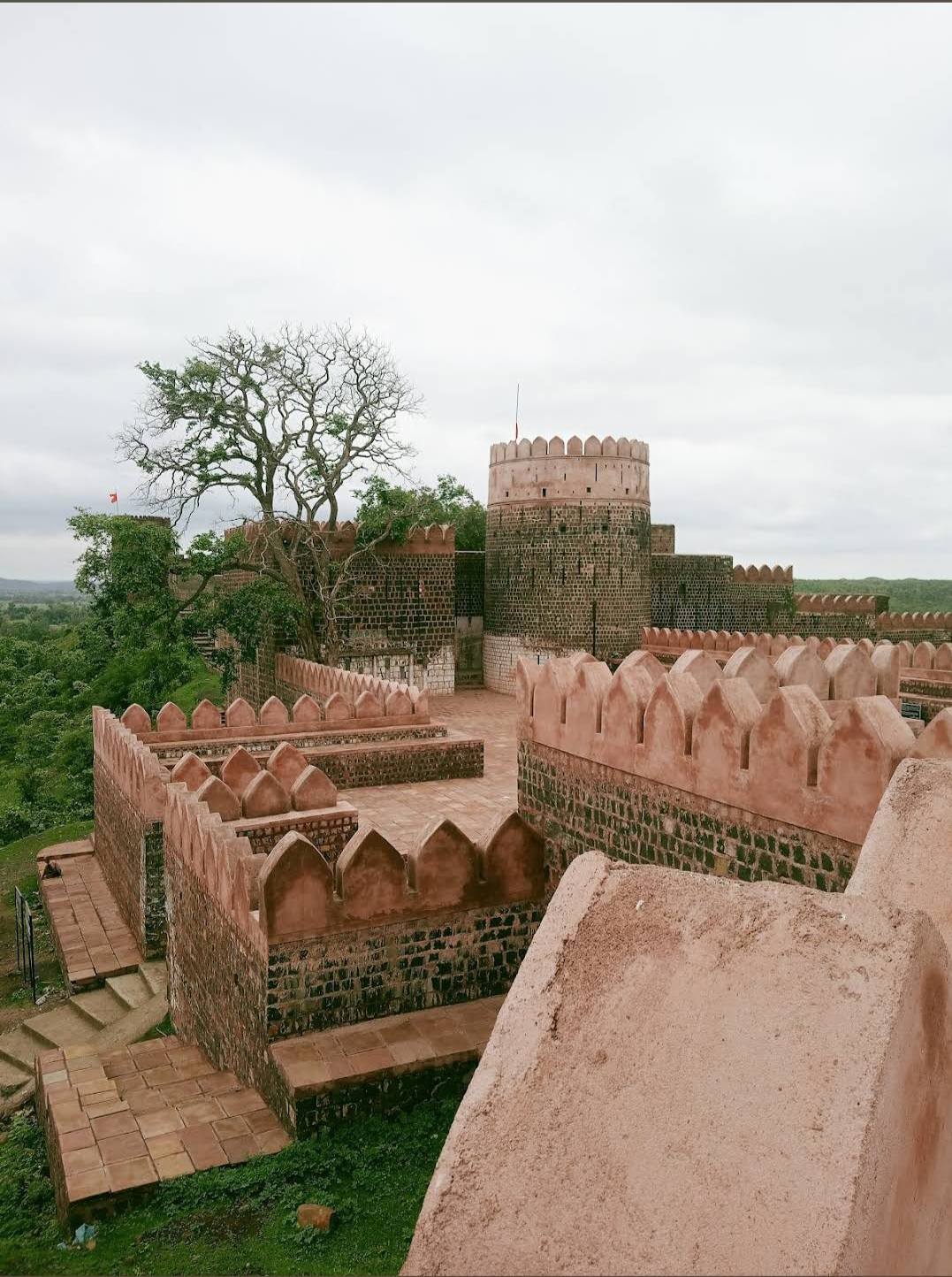
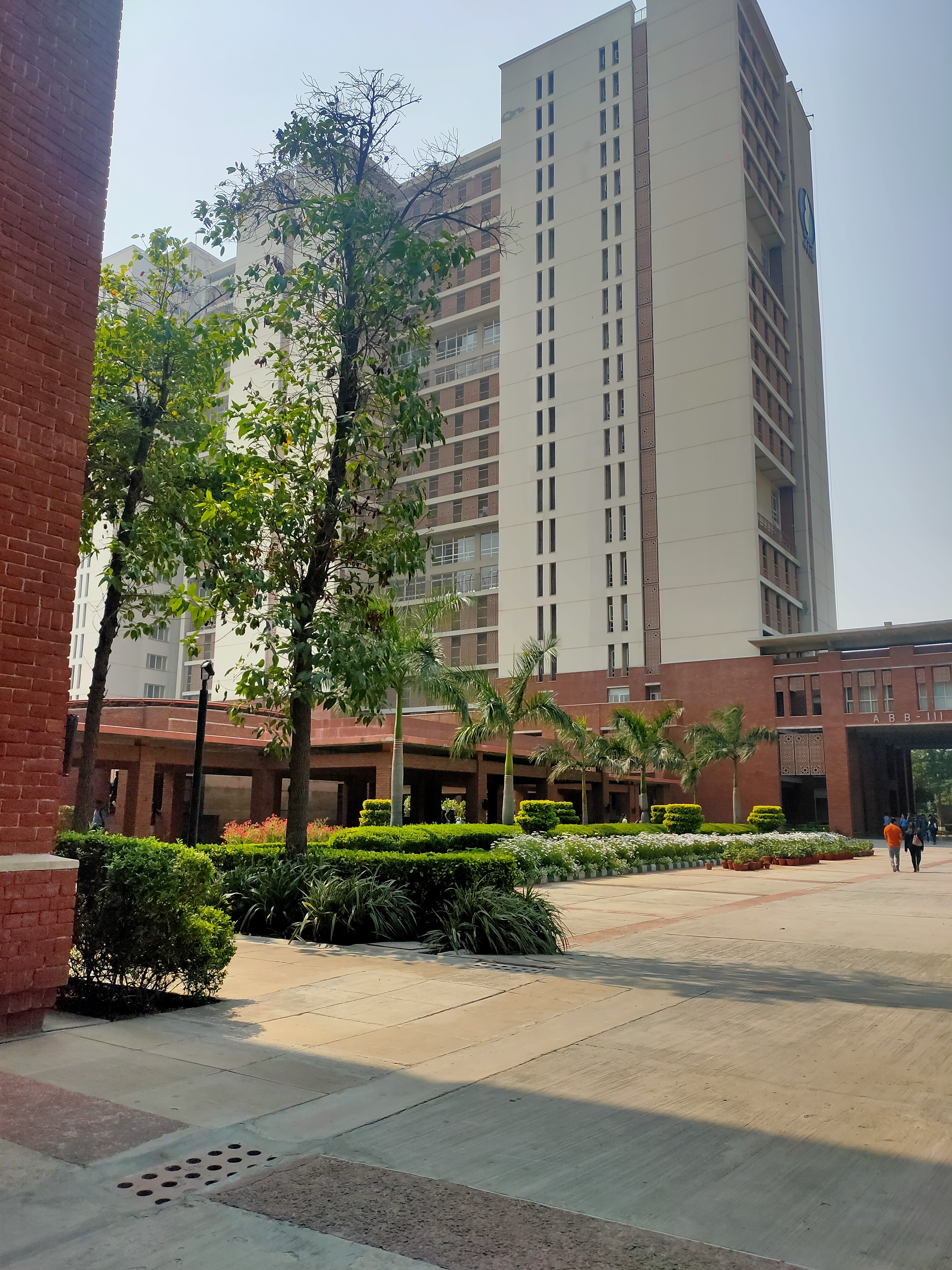
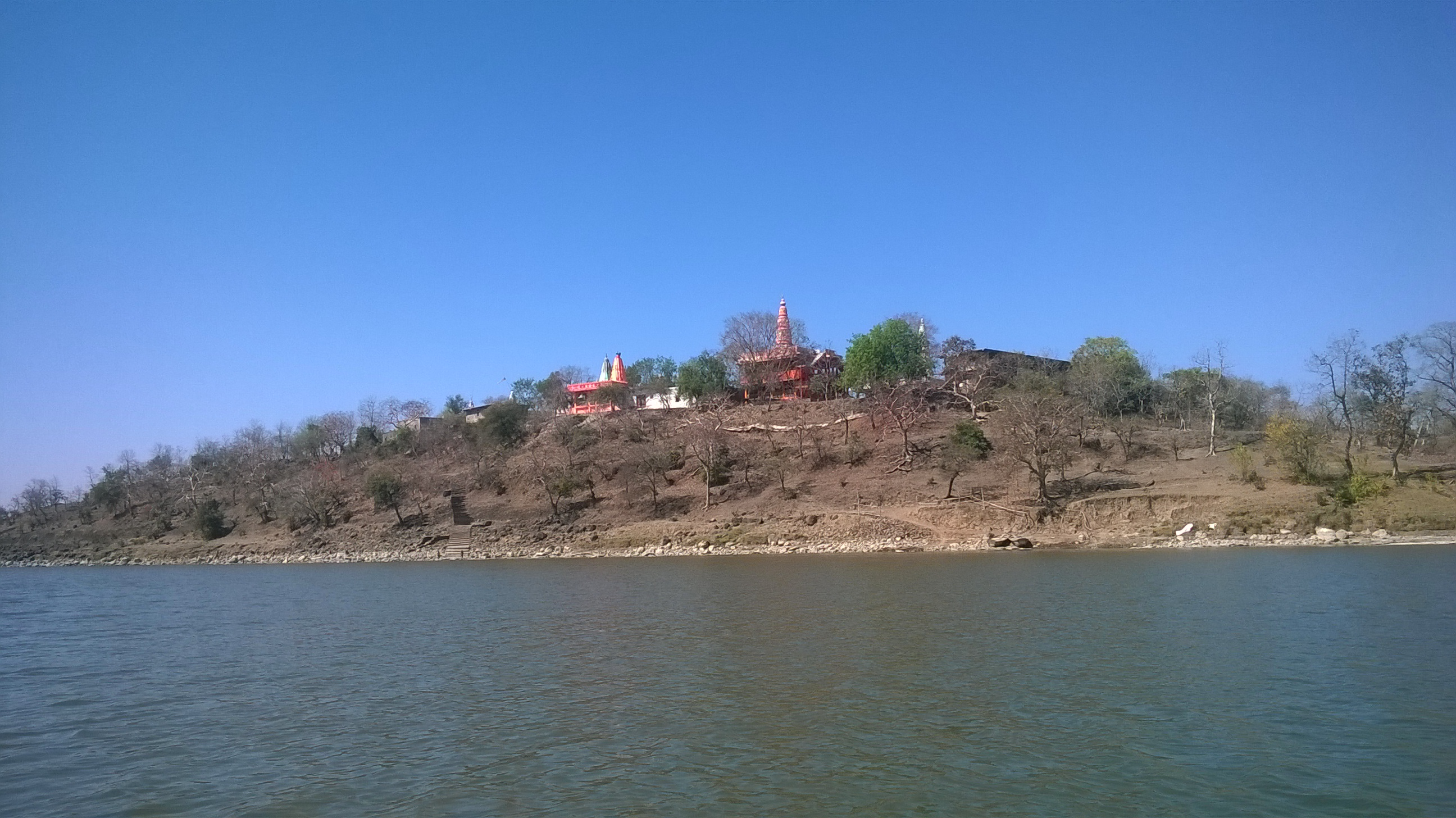
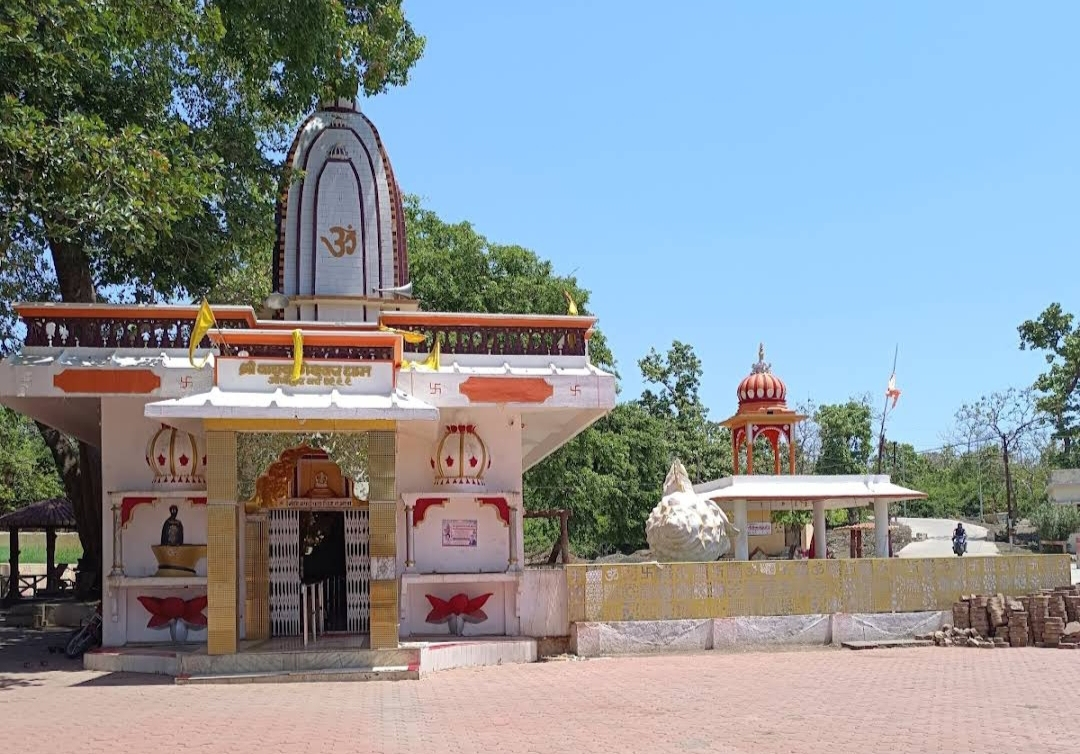
- NFL unit Vijaypur, Guna Chachaura Fort, Guna Jaypee Institute, Guna Tekri view Bag Bageshwar Dham, Chachaura

- Location of Guna district in Madhya Pradesh

- Development Blocks Map of Guna District
- Country: India
- State: Madhya Pradesh
- Division: Gwalior
- Headquarters: Guna
- Tehsils: 1. Guna, 2. Roghogarh, 3. Aron, 4. Chachaura, 5. Kumbhraj, 6. Bamori, 7. Maksoodangarh

Government
  - Lok Sabha constituencies: 1. Guna (shared with Shivpuri and Ashoknagar districts), 2. Rajgarh (shared with Rajgarh district)
  - Vidhan Sabha constituencies: 1. Bamori, 2. Guna, 3. Chachoura and 4. Raghogarh

Area
  - Total: 6,390 km^{2} (2,470 sq mi)

Population (2011)
  - Total: 1,241,519
  - Density: 194/km^{2} (503/sq mi)
  - Urban: 24.46 %

Demographics
  - Literacy: 65.1 %
  - Sex ratio: 910/1000
- Time zone: UTC+05:30 (IST)
- Average annual precipitation: 65 mm
- Website: guna.nic.in

Guna district (Hindi pronunciation: [gʊnaː]) is one of the 55 districts of Madhya Pradesh in central India. Its administrative headquarters is Guna. The district has a population of 1,241,519 (2011 census). It has an area of 6390 km², and is bounded on the northeast by Shivpuri District, on the east by Ashoknagar District, on the southeast by Vidisha District, on the southwest by Rajgarh District, on the west and northwest by Jhalawar and Baran districts of Rajasthan state. The Sindh River flows northward along the eastern edge of the district, forming part of the boundary with Ashoknagar District, and the Parvati River flows northwestward through the southern portion of the district, forming part of the boundary with Baran District before flowing into Rajasthan.

On 15 August 2003 Guna District was split in two, with the eastern portion becoming Ashoknagar District.

Guna was part of the ancient Avanti Kingdom founded by Chand Pradyota Mahesena. Later Shishusangh added the kingdom of Avant, which included Guna to the growing empire of Magadha. In the early 18th century, Guna was conquered by the Maratha leader Ramoji Rao Scindia, and remained part of the Kingdom of Gwalior until shortly after Indian independence. Guna was administered as part of the kingdom's Isagarh District. In 1897 the Indian Midland Railway constructed a rail route passing through Guna. After India gained independence, Guna became part of the new state of Madhya Bharat on 28 May 1948 as one of its 16 districts. On 1 November 1956, Madhya Bharat was merged into Madhya Pradesh state.

== Geography ==
Guna is located at 24.65°N 77.32°E.[1] It has an average elevation of 474 metres (1555 ft).

Guna district of Madhya Pradesh is the gateway of Malwa and Chambal. It is located on the north-eastern part of Malwa Plateau. Western boundary of the District is well defined by Parbati river. Parvati is the main river flowing along the western boundary touching Rajgarh District of Madhya Pradesh, and Jhalawarh and Kota Districts of Rajasthan. Towns Shivpuri and Kota are located in north and the cities Vidisha, Bhopal, and Rajgarh lie to the South. The eastern boundary of district define by Sindh river.

== Sub-divisions ==
- Guna district divided into 7 Tehsil –
1. Guna
2. Raghogarh
3. Aron
4. Chachaura
5. Bamori
6. Maksoodangarh
7. Kumbhraj

== Blocks ==
1. Guna
2. Raghogarh
3. Aron
4. Chachoura
5. Bamori

== Assembly constituencies ==
There are 4 Madhya Pradesh Vidhan Sabha constituencies located in this district. Two of them, Bamori and Guna are part of Guna Lok Sabha constituency and the other two, Chachoura and Raghogarh are part of Rajgarh Lok Sabha constituency.

== Demographics ==
Historical population
Year	Pop.	±% p.a.
1901	182,142	—
1911	215,344	+1.69%
1921	209,012	−0.30%
1931	232,732	+1.08%
1941	260,822	+1.15%
1951	263,614	+0.11%
1961	318,030	+1.89%
1971	426,292	+2.97%
1981	557,434	+2.72%
1991	751,060	+3.03%
2001	977,827	+2.67%
2011	1,241,519	+2.42%

Religions in Guna district (2011)
Religion	Percent
Hinduism	94.42%
Islam	3.96%
Jainism	1.09%
Other or not stated	0.53%

According to the 2011 census Guna District has a population of 1,241,519, roughly equal to the nation of Trinidad and Tobago or the US state of New Hampshire. This gives it a ranking of 388th in India (out of a total of 640).

The district has a population density of 194 inhabitants per square kilometre (500/sq mi). Its population growth rate over the decade 2001-2011 was 26.91%. Guna has a sex ratio of 910 females for every 1000 males, and a literacy rate of 65.1%. 25.18% of the population live in urban areas. Scheduled Castes and Tribes made up 15.55% and 15.37% of the population respectively.

Hindi is the predominant language, spoken by 99.39% of the population.

As of 2011 India census, Guna City has a population of 180,978. Males constitute 52.29% of the population and females 47.71%. Guna has an average literacy rate of 81.7%, In Guna, 13% of the population is under 6 years of age. Hanumaan Tekri is a famous temple in Guna. This temple place is on a hill. The famous Fort of Maharaja Jai Singh is located in Bajrangarh (8 km from Guna). The village also has a famous Jain Temple called Jain Atishay Kshetra. NH3 also passes via Guna. Guna is the constituency for Jyotiraditya Scindia.

== Tourist places ==
- Tekri Sarkar
- Shri Baag Bageshwar Dhaam Chachaura
- Champavati Fort
- Gopi Krishan Sagar Dam
- Bajrangarh Fort
- Beesbhuja Devi Temple

== Village ==
- Bajranggarh
- Miyana
- kinder
