= MOJ =

MOJ or moj may refer to:

- Ministry of justice, a ministry or other government agency in charge of the administration of justice
- Moengo Airstrip (IATA: MOJ), an airport serving Moengo, Suriname
- Moj, an Indian video-sharing service
- Moj Mahdara, Iranian-American entrepreneur
- Mohana railway station (Station code: MOJ), a railway station in Madhya Pradesh, India
- MOJ (motorcycle), defunct Polish motorcycle brand
- Monzombo language (ISO 639-3: moj), a minor Ubangian language of the Congos
