= Yukgeori Market =

Market in Cheongju, South Korea

Yukgeori Market (Korean: 육거리시장) is the representative traditional market of Cheongju, North Chungcheong Province, South Korea. It is a combination of 12 markets with 1200 stores, 3300 employees in total and covers an area of 99,000 square metres. Approximately 50,000 to 60,000 people visit it daily and the annual sales are said to exceed 300 billion won.

== History and etymology ==
Yukgeori means a six-way intersection; the market was so named because it naturally developed at such an intersection. There was a cattle market along the Musimcheon Stream, a market for agricultural products and firewood, a soup restaurant and a blacksmith. This was the beginning of the market, formerly known as the Cheongju Market, during the Joseon Dynasty. Since 1973 the market has been called Yukgeori Market.

Namseokyo Bridge, built around the end of the Goryeo Dynasty, a stone bridge about 80 meters long, was buried in the market floor in 1936. It is said that damage occurred whenever the Musimcheon Stream near the market flooded. During the period when Korea was under the Japanese colonial occupation, the surrounding area was reclaimed and Namseokgyo Bridge was gradually buried. Every year 'Namseokgyo Dakgyo Nori' festival is held at the market on the occasion of Daeboreum. 'Namseokgyo Bridge' is the symbol of the Yukgeori Market. The stone bridge is divided into six colours, symbolising the type of goods available with red representing meat, yellow representing processed foods, orange representing fruits and vegetables, green representing agricultural products, purple representing industrial products, and blue representing marine products.

== Markets and products ==
Yukgeori Market follows the unique tradition of Korean markets. lt operates as a street market with a 5-day and dawn market, held 5 days every month (2nd, 7th, 12th, 17th, 22nd and 27th of each month). Not only is it located at the centre of the intersection of six roads, but is also the place where 12 markets merge. The 12 markets are Agricultural Equipment Street, Agricultural Products Street, Wild Vegetable Street, Mill Street, Pharmaceutical Street, Dakjeon Street, Honsu Street, Hanmaeum Fashion Street, Eat Street, Flower Bridge and Goblin Market. The market has numerous food stalls and alleys selling traditional Korean cuisine, among which the popular ones are Sundae(blood sausage), pajeon (savory pancake), tteok(rice cake), pig's trotters and grilled pork belly.

Goblin Market, which is now called the dawn market, in the old days the market stood for a while and disappeared like a goblin fire. It is often considered the highlight of the Cheongju Yukgeori Market and takes place in the early mornings from 5 am to 8 am. The dawn market is called dokkaebi sijang(Korean 도깨비 시장). It is open from 5–8 AM, at a roadway in front of a flower bridge (Korean 꽃다리) . Here you can buy numerous agricultural products. Farmers in Cheongju sell crops they cultivated and harvested in person. Thus one can get fresh crops at a reasonable price without any distributors.

== Revitalization of the market ==
Yukgeori Market is an excellent example of a traditional market which has evolved in a comparatively non-metropolitan area as compared to other metropolitan areas of South Korea. It has survived in a time when traditional markets are losing their vitality and are losing their commercial spaces to large markets, while simultaneously preserving the intrinsic value of traditional markets. Studies have shown that its spatial configurational features create a network that causes interactions between the market and the surrounding suburban components, which in turn affects the flow, transport and potential movement of pedestrians. This helps Yukgeori market maintain and promote social and commercial activities, thereby supporting its revitalization. Yukgeori Market is constantly trying to change itself to attract more visitors. It is the first traditional Market, which consists of about 1,200 stores, to launch market gift certificates in 2003, and the use of Onnuri Gift Certificates is active, which has resulted in the increase in visitors. Various festivals like the Spring festival: (전통시장 봄내음 축제;jeontongsijang bomnaeeum chukje) and 2021 Event Wishing Covid Pandemic Be Over, are also held at the market which draws attention and participation from visitors and merchants to the market.

== Awards and recognition ==
From 2007 to 2009, the market received two Presidential Awards and two Ministerial Awards. It received the title of "excellent market" for three consecutive years from 2009 to 2011 at the South Korean Leading Market Expo hosted by the Small and Medium Business Administration (now known as the Ministry of Small and Medium Enterprises and Startup). In 2015, it was selected as the target site for the Project of Promoting Global Premium Markets by the Small and Medium Business Administration (SMBA) and the Korea Tourism Organization(KTO).

== See also ==
- List of Markets in South Korea
- List of South Korean tourist attractions
