= List of Running Man episodes (2024) =

- No. of episodes: 48

Release
- Original network: SBS
- Original release: January 7 – December 22, 2024

Season chronology
- ← Previous; 2023 Next → 2025

This is a list of episodes of the South Korean variety show Running Man in 2024. The show airs on SBS as part of their Good Sunday lineup.

== Episodes ==
List of episodes broadcast in 2024 (686–733)
| Ep. | Airdate | Title | Guest(s) | Teams | Mission | Results | Ref. |
|---|---|---|---|---|---|---|---|
| 686 (Note: Ji Suk-jin did not attend the filming due to his health checkup.) (Note: New Year Special) | January 7, 2024 | Running Villa in Crisis (위기의 런닝빌라) | Keum Sae-rok; Kim Dong-hyun; Noh Sang-hyun | Room 102 (Yoo Jae-suk, Kim Dong-hyun) Room 104 (Haha, Song Ji-hyo) Room 101 (Kim Jong-kook, Noh Sang-hyun) Room 103 (Yang Se-chan, Keum Sae-rok) | Defeat the other team to avoid penalty. | The mission was won by Room 101, Room 102 and Room 103. Room 104 had to clean the ice before going home as a penalty. | |
| 687 (Note: Winter Special) | January 14, 2024 | 2nd Winter Festival (제2회 윈터페스티벌) | Eom Ji-yoon; Jo Se-ho; Kyuhyun (Super Junior) | No teams | Catch as many fish as possible for the highest chance to win the prizes. | There are no winners. Yang Se-chan had the most lottery tickets and Jo Se-ho had the fewest. Yoo Jae-suk received a pair of socks, handwarmer and ramyeon set. Kim Jong Kook received the stay awake gum and the first Korean beef set, but he would give it to Jo Se-ho instead. Song Ji-hyo received the grand prize of the Designer Bracelet. Yang Se-chan received a box of strawberries. Eom Ji-yoon received the second Korean beef set and Kyuhyun received the designer scarf. | |
| 688 | January 21, 2024 | Will You be Satisfied with Me? (내가 만족할 상인가) | Hong Jin-ho; Jonathan Yiombi; Kim Dong-hyun | Yoo Jae-suk Team (Yoo Jae-suk, Haha, Hong Jin-ho, Kim Dong-hyun); Kim Jong-kook Team (Kim Jong-kook, Song Ji-hyo, Yang Se-chan, Jonathan Yiombi) The Joseon Dynasty Statuses: Yoo Jae-suk as Beggar; Haha as Foreign envoy Kim Jong-Kook as Concubine; Song Ji-hyo as Local Magistrate; Yang Se-chan as Crown prince Hong Jin-ho as Slave Hunter; Jonathan Yiombi as Scholar; Kim Dong-hyun as Slave | Find the 3 right dishes before 3 pm to win the prizes. | There are no winners. Yoo Jae-suk and Kim Dong-hyun, whose penalty ball was drawn, received the flogging penalty. | |
| 689 (Note: Ji Suk-jin returns in this episode.) | January 28, 2024 | Ji Seok-jin Oh~swa Healthy Oh~swa (지석진 오~솨 건강 오~솨) | No guest | No teams | Light up the smileys according from 1–5 to win the prize. | Mission Accomplished. Since the members light up 3 smileys, they received abalone set as a prize. | |
| 690 (Note: Brief appearance by Lee Kwang-soo through the phone.) | February 4, 2024 | Wonderful Value! for Money (경이로운 갓!성비) | No guest | No teams | Spend all of your mission funds and be in the Top 3 to win the prize. | The mission was won by Yoo Jae-suk, Kim Jong-kook, and Yang Se-chan. Yoo Jae-suk receives Ji Suk-jin's money, Kim Jong-kook receives Song Ji-hyo's money and Yang Se-chan receives Haha's money as a prize respectively. | |
| 691 (Note: Special appearances by Hong Jin-ho and Jonathan Yiombi) (Note: Lunar New Year Special) | February 11, 2024 | It Is the Ji's Family Who Repays the Favor (은혜 갚은 지家네) | No guest | The Ji Family: Children (Yoo Jae-suk, Song Ji-hyo, Yang Se-chan); Son-in-law (Haha); Grandchildren (Ji Suk-jin, Kim Jong-kook) | Give the new year's foods to the recent guests as a token of gratitude for their hard works. | There are no winners. Hong Jin-ho receives the Korean beef and pork set, while Jonathan Yiombi receives the Korean beef set, and both Kim Dong-hyun and Jo Se-ho received the hangwa gift sets instead, as both of them were not available due to their busy schedules. | |
| 692 | February 18, 2024 | The Legendary Gold Bar (전설의 금괴) | Ahn Bo-hyun; Park Ji-hyun | Thieves Team (Yoo Jae-suk, Kim Jong-kook, Yang Se-chan, Park Ji-hyun); Detectives Team (Haha, Ji Suk-jin, Song Ji-hyo, Ahn Bo-hyun) | Find the real gold bar that was missing to stop the judgement stand's siren and avoid the fake gold bar. | The mission was won by Yoo Jae-suk, who finds the real gold bar by tearing Yang Se-chan's name tag and put it in the water to show the real gold bar in the name tag, receives the gold ring. Detectives Team had to write a repentance which will be posted on RM's official Instagram Account after the filming as a penalty. | |
| 693 | February 25, 2024 | I will Win in My Next Life (다음 생엔 내가 우승이야) | Hong Jin-ho; Kazuha; Kim Chae-won; Sakura (Le Sserafim); Kim Dong-hyun | Jae-suk Team (Yoo Jae-suk, Yang Se-chan, Sakura); Haha Team (Haha, Song Ji-hyo, Kim Dong-hyun, Kazuha); Suk-jin Team (Ji Suk-jin, Kim Jong-kook, Hong Jin-ho, Kim Chae-won) | Have the most team money to win the race. | The mission was won by Haha Team. The winners received the strawberry sets. Jae-suk Team, who had the least team money, had to make a comb pattern pottery after the filming as a penalty. | |
| 694 | March 3, 2024 | I will Win in My Next Life II (다음 생엔 내가 우승이야 II) | Hong Jin-ho; Kazuha; Kim Chae-won; Sakura (Le Sserafim); Kim Dong-hyun | Jae-suk Team (Yoo Jae-suk, Yang Se-chan, Sakura); Haha Team (Haha, Song Ji-hyo, Kim Dong-hyun, Kazuha); Suk-jin Team (Ji Suk-jin, Kim Jong-kook, Hong Jin-ho, Kim Chae-won) | Have the most team money to win the race. | The mission was won by Haha Team. The winners received the strawberry sets. Jae-suk Team, who had the least team money, had to make a comb pattern pottery after the filming as a penalty. | |
| 694 | March 3, 2024 | Towards the tower (과탑을 향하여) | Lee Eun-ji | MZ Rhythm Game: Departement President (Yoo Jae-suk); Jae-suk Team (Yoo Jae-suk, Ji Suk-jin, Yang Se-chan, Lee Eun-ji); Haha Team (Haha, Kim Jong-kook, Song Ji-hyo); University's Next Top Model: Departement President (Yang Se-chan); Se-chan Team (Yang Se-chan, Yoo Jae-suk, Kim Jong-kook, Song Ji-hyo); Suk-jin Team (Ji Suk-jin, Haha, Lee Eun-ji); Protect the Water Balloon: Departement President (Ji Suk-jin); Jae-suk Team (Yoo Jae-suk, Haha, Song Ji-hyo, Lee Eun-ji); Suk-jin Team (Ji Suk-jin, Kim Jong-kook, Yang Se-chan) | Have the most scholarship money to win the race. | The mission was won by Kim Jong-kook and Yang Se-chan. Kim Jong-kook was chosen by the prize ball received the Korean beef set. Ji Suk-jin, who was chosen by the penalty ball, had to pay the Korean beef set that Kim Jong-kook just won. | |
| 695 | March 10, 2024 | Top Teacher Yoo Jae-suk's Empty Head Historical Visit (일타강사 유재석의 깡깡 역사 탐방) | Hong Jin-ho; Kim Dong-hyun | No teams | Without having the fewest badges to avoid penalty. | The mission was won by Haha, Ji Suk-jin, Kim Jong-kook, Song Ji-hyo, Kim Dong-hyun & Hong Jin-ho. Yang Se-chan, who had the fewest badges, received the water slap penalty from Yoo Jae-suk. | |
| 696 (Note: Brief appearances by Cho Hye-seon (Kim Jong-kook's mother), Song Ji-hyo's father, Kim Jong-min, Song Eun-i, Lee Yi-kyung, and Heo Kyung-hwan through the phone.) | March 17, 2024 | Running Old Shops Marble (런닝 노포마불) | No guest | No teams | Have the most year scores from the badges to avoid penalty. | The mission was won by Yang Se-chan. Yoo Jae-suk and Song Ji-hyo, who had the least year scores, had to go to the sundaeguk restaurant to put the Running Man accredited good restaurant sticker at the restaurant that they just praised. | |
| 697 | March 24, 2024 | 1st Futsal Running Cup (제1회 풋살 런닝컵) | Jonathan Yiombi; Kang Hoon; Ma Sun-ho; Oh Ha-young (Apink) | Coach Yoo Team (Yoo Jae-suk, Haha, Ji Suk-jin, Jonathan Yiombi, Oh Ha-young); Coach Kook Team (Kim Jong-kook, Song Ji-hyo, Yang Se-chan, Kang Hoon, Ma Sun-ho) | Win the game of futsal. The three members on the losing team with the lowest salary will receive the penalty. | The game was won by Coach Kook Team. Each member on Coach Kook team receives a winning trophy and a box of gold apples. Haha, Ji Suk-jin and Oh Ha-young, who are the bottom three with the lowest salary, had to make 100 shots with Yoo Jae-suk who was the coach of losing team as a penalty. | |
| 698 (Note: Brief appearance by Key (Shinee) through the phone.) | March 31, 2024 | The Hips are full (힙이 차오른다) | No guest | No teams | Have the highest combined numbers from multiple dices to avoid penalty. | The mission was won by Ji Suk-jin and Song Ji-hyo. Yoo Jae-suk, Haha, Kim Jong-kook and Yang Se-chan had to go pantless during the TV Rating Notice's poster photoshoot on the next episode's filming as a penalty. | |
| 699 (Note: Last episode's losers Yoo Jae-suk, Haha, Kim Jong-kook and Yang Se-chan had to go pantless during the TV Rating Notice's poster photoshoot.) (Note: Special appearance by photographer Oh Jung-suk (Only appeared during the photoshoot sessions)) | April 7, 2024 | Spring has come to TV Rating Notice (연령고지에 봄이 왔나봐) | No guest | No teams | Have the least distances that were covered to avoid penalty. | Mission Accomplished. With the least distances that they covered, they were able to film the new TV Rating Notice at Everland. | |
| 700 (Note: 700th Episode special) (Note: The Production team pretended naming the last mission as "The Prize Money Battle Race" to hide Yoo Jae-suk's identity as Yoo-mes Bond for the entire race) | April 14, 2024 | Sweet and Sweet 7 Million Dollars (달디달고 달디단 700만원) | No guest | Fly, 360 Degrees: No teams Confetti Must Pop: No teams 700th Episode Celebration's Virtual Livestream: (Note: The Virtual Livestream was filmed first before the opening.); Yoo Jae-suk as Latte; Haha as Ilton; Ji Suk-jin as Shinbi; Kim Jong-kook as Bom; Song Ji-hyo as Dean; Yang Se-chan as Love; 007: The Return of Yoo-mes Bond Mission: Yoo-mes Bond (Yoo Jae-suk); Mission Team (Haha, Ji Suk-jin, Kim Jong-kook, Song Ji-hyo, Yang Se-chan) | Win multiple missions to obtain the most the prize money. | The mission was won by Yoo Jae-suk, who received ₩4,100,000, with all the members received ₩680,000 each. | |
| 701 (Note: Brief appearances by Wolverhampton Wanderers Footballer Hwang Hee-chan and Gwangju FC's Manager Lee Jung-hyo via video messages, and Oh Ha-young (Apink) through the phone.) (Note: Special appearance by FIFA international referee Moon Dae-Sung (only appeared during the futsal match).) | April 21, 2024 | 2nd Futsal Running Cup (제2회 풋살 런닝컵) | Bae Hye-ji; Jonathan Yiombi; Kang Hoon; Kim Dong-hyun; Ma Sun-ho; Seo Eun-kwang (BtoB) | FC Ttuk: Coach (Yoo Jae-suk); Players (Haha, Ji Suk-jin, Bae Hye-ji, Jonathan Yiombi, Seo Eun-kwang); FC Kook: Coach (Kim Jong-kook); Players (Song Ji-hyo, Yang Se-chan, Kang Hoon, Kim Dong-hyun, Ma Sun-ho) | Win the game of futsal. | The game was won by FC Kook. FC Kook's debt has been paid off and FC Ttuk's debt had reached ₩591,400. Kim Jong-kook and Kang Hoon, who was the winning manager and the MVP of the match, received the Korean pork set as a prize. Yoo Jae-suk and the production team had decided to pay half the debt respectively. | |
| 702 (Note: Kang Han-na acted as the writer for this episode.) | April 28, 2024 | Half of The Future (한나절의 미래) | Joo Jong-hyuk; Kang Han-na | Let us Clap Together: No teams Helicopter Tour: (Ji Suk-jin, Yang Se-chan, Kang Han-na, Joo Jong-hyuk); A Wonderful 8 words proposal: No teams Chili Jjamppong Eating Challenge: (Note: Yang Se-chan choose Kang Han-na and Joo Jong-hyuk to do the dances while Ji Suk-jin had to do errands as well.) (Yoo Jae-suk, Kim Jong-kook, Song Ji-hyo, Yang Se-chan); Water Bomb Penalty: (Haha, Kim Jong-kook, Yang Se-chan, Joo Jong-hyuk, Kang Han-na) | Have the fewest notebooks that were hidden to change any plans that were written by the writer. | There are no winners. Haha, Kim Jong-kook, Yang Se-chan, Joo Jong-hyuk and Kang Han-na were chosen to receive the water cannon penalty. | |
| 703 | May 5, 2024 | Returning Go Stop (돌아온 Go Stop) | Kwon Eun-bi | Green Light, Red Light with Eggs: Tagger (Kim Jong-kook); Team 1 (Yoo Jae-suk, Ji Suk-jin); Team 2 (Haha, Yang Se-chan); Team 3 (Song Ji-hyo, Kwon Eun-bi); Question Bloomed on the Skywalk: No Teams; Luge Racing: Blue Team (Yoo Jae-suk, Haha, Kim Jong-kook, Yang Se-chan); Red Team (Ji Suk-jin, Song Ji-hyo, Kwon Eun-bi) | Choose the button between Go or Stop | The mission was won by Yoo Jae-suk, Haha and Kwon Eun-bi. The winners will go home early. Ji Suk-jin, Kim Jong-kook, Song Ji-hyo and Yang Se-chan had to collect a basket of mugworts after the filming as a penalty. | |
| 704 | May 12, 2024 | More Wonderful Value! for Money Part.2 (더 경이로운 갓!성비 2탄) | Byeon Woo-seok | No teams | Have the most money by guessing the closest price of the dishes to avoid penalty. | The mission was won by Yoo Jae-suk and Byeon Woo-seok, through the hidden mission, will received the Onnuri Gift Certificates as a prize. Ji Suk-jin and Yang Se-chan had to buy five different products at a market separately as a penalty. | |
| 705 | May 19, 2024 | I Have to Come in First Place (1위를해야해) | An Yu-jin; Rei (Ive) | Smile Entertainment (Yoo Jae-suk, Ji Suk-jin, Song Ji-hyo, Rei); Tur-ve Entertainment (Kim Jong-kook, Haha, Yang Se-chan, An Yu-jin) | Produce a debut single and receive the most profit to win the race. | The mission was won by Smile Entertainment. Yoo Jae Suk received their self-produced album and Rei received coffee truck coupon as a prize. Tur-ve Entertainment had to take concept photos after the filming as a penalty which will be released on RM's official YouTube channel. | |
| 706 (Note: Kang Hoon's first episode as rental member.) (Note: Kang Hoon's birthday special.) (Note: First episode to have the rental system to be utilized for the first time.) | May 26, 2024 | Oh My Gosh Kang Hoon (어화둥둥 강훈이) | No guest | No teams | Complete all three missions in order to finish the filming early. | Mission Accomplished. Kang Hoon received an electric toothbrush, the football shoes, a football uniform and a t-shirt. Yoo Jae-suk's card was used to pay the first three prizes that were chosen while the production staff used their card to paid a t-shirt prize. | |
| 707 | June 2, 2024 | Between Partner and Fake Partner (짝꿍과 짭꿍 사이) | Ji Ye-eun; Park Ju-hyun | Fake Partner (Yoo Jae-suk, Haha, Ji Suk-jin, Kim Jong-kook, Song Ji-hyo, Yang Se-chan, Ji Ye-eun) Real Partner (Kang Hoon, Park Ju-hyun) | Find and pair with the real partner. | The mission was won by Yoo Jae-suk, Kim Jong-kook, Kang Hoon and Park Ju-hyun. Yoo Jae-suk and Kim Jong-kook, who partnered with the real partner, each received ₩300,000. Through a game of luck, Ji Suk-jin, Yang Se-chan and Ji Ye-eun had their faces squeezed in the sponges filled with ink as a penalty. | |
| 708 | June 9, 2024 | 3rd Hwang Hee-chan Cup Futsal Running Cup (제3회 황희찬배 풋살 런닝컵) | Heo Kyung-hwan; Hwang Hee-chan; Jang Hyuk; Kang Jae-jun; Oh Ha-young (Apink); Zico (Block B) | FC Ttuk: Coach (Yoo Jae-suk); Players (Haha, Ji Suk-jin, Heo Kyung-hwan, Hwang Hee-chan, Oh Ha-young); FC Kook: Coach (Kim Jong-kook); Players (Song Ji-hyo, Yang Se-chan, Kang Hoon, Jang Hyuk, Kang Jae-jun, Zico) | Win a game of futsal | The game was won by FC Ttuk. FC Ttuk received the highest Korean beef set. Kim Jong-kook, who was the losing coach of FC Kook, had to pay the total of ₩303,760, also FC Kook had to film a video within 30 seconds of approving the winning coach Yoo Jae-suk's leadership as a penalty which behind scene and penalizing video will be released on RM's official YouTube channel. | |
| 709 (Note: Kang Hoon did not attend the second part of the episode due to the filming of his drama.) | June 16, 2024 | 3rd Hwang Hee-chan Cup Futsal Running Cup II (제3회 황희찬배 풋살 런닝컵 II) | Heo Kyung-hwan; Hwang Hee-chan; Jang Hyuk; Kang Jae-jun; Oh Ha-young (Apink); Zico (Block B) | FC Ttuk: Coach (Yoo Jae-suk); Players (Haha, Ji Suk-jin, Heo Kyung-hwan, Hwang Hee-chan, Oh Ha-young); FC Kook: Coach (Kim Jong-kook); Players (Song Ji-hyo, Yang Se-chan, Kang Hoon, Jang Hyuk, Kang Jae-jun, Zico) | Win a game of futsal | The game was won by FC Ttuk. FC Ttuk received the highest Korean beef set. Kim Jong-kook, who was the losing coach of FC Kook, had to pay the total of ₩303,760, also FC Kook had to film a video within 30 seconds of approving the winning coach Yoo Jae-suk's leadership as a penalty which behind scene and penalizing video will be released on RM's official YouTube channel. | |
| 709 | June 16, 2024 | Joint Escape Area Race (공동탈출구역 레이스) | Ji Ye-eun | No teams | Win the game of snakes and ladders in 3 hours to escape the room. | Mission Accomplished. | |
| 710 | June 23, 2024 | Summer Meal Break Initiated (여름 개시 먹캉스) | No guest | No teams | Being the top two with the most badge at the end of the race to avoid penalty | The mission was won by Yoo Jae-suk and Song Ji-hyo. Yang Se-chan, who had the fewest badges at the end of the race and Kang Hoon, whose penalty ball was drawn by himself, had to distribute all 50 Running Man promotional fans in public as a penalty which will be released on RM's official YouTube channel. | |
| 711 (Note: Ji Ye-eun's first episode as rental member.) | June 30, 2024 | The Unknown Choice (미지의 선택지) | No guest | Captains (Ji Suk-jin, Ji Ye-eun) Players (Yoo Jae-suk, Haha, Kim Jong-kook, Song Ji-hyo, Yang Se-chan, Kang Hoon) | Earn as many badges as possible to increase your chances of avoiding the penalty. | The mission was won by Yoo Jae-suk, Haha, Kang Hoon and Ji Ye-eun. Ji Suk-jin, Kim Jong-kook, Song Ji-hyo and Yang Se-chan received the water slap penalty. | |
| 712 | July 7, 2024 | Good and Bad Partner (굿앤배드 파트너) | Nam Ji-hyun; P.O (Block B) | Jae-suk Team (Yoo Jae-suk, Yang Se-chan, Kang Hoon, Ji Ye-eun, Nam Ji-hyun) Jong-kook Team (Kim Jong-kook, Haha, Ji Suk-jin, Song Ji-hyo, P.O) | Choose the "Good Partner" and without choosing the "Bad Partner". | The mission was won by Yoo Jae-suk, Ji Suk-jin, Kim Jong-kook, Haha, Song Ji-hyo and P.O. P.O, who was the "Good Partner", was chosen by Yoo Jae-suk, Ji Suk-jin, Kim Jong-kook, Haha, and Song Ji-hyo each received the peaches set. Nam Ji-hyun, who was the "Bad Partner", was chosen by Yang Se-chan, Kang Hoon, and Ji Ye-eun had to drain the water from the pool after the filming as a penalty. | |
| 713 (Note: 14th Anniversary SBS Running Man Special) | July 14, 2024 | Temperature Differences in the Middle of Summer (한여름의 온도차) | No Guests | No Teams | Have the most members with the lowest temperature to win the race. | Mission Accomplished. | |
| 714 (Note: 2024 Paris Olympics Special) (Note: Kang Hoon's last episode as a Rental member.) | July 21, 2024 | 2024 Burning Runningpic (2024 불타는 런닝픽) | No Guests | Jae-suk Team (Yoo Jae-suk, Haha, Song Ji-hyo, Kang Hoon) Jong-kook Team (Kim Jong-kook, Ji Suk-jin, Yang Se-chan, Ji Ye-eun) | Keep your team's flame from going out. | The mission was won by Jong-kook Team. Yoo Jae-suk and Song Ji-hyo had to re-ignite their team's flame and use it to cook food as a penalty. | |
| 715 | August 18, 2024 | The Desperate Villagecance (필사의 촌캉스) | Park Sung-woong; Yoon Kyung-ho | Civilian (Yoo Jae-suk, Haha, Ji Suk-jin, Kim Jong-kook, Song Ji-hyo, Yang Se-chan, Ji Ye-eun) Mafia Boss (Yoon Kyung-ho) Head of Village (Criminal) (Park Sung-woong) | Civilian; Identify and eliminate the Head of Village before he/she collected and burnt 3 name tages with a red diamond sticker Mafia Boss; Find the treasure and survive to the end Head of Village; Eliminate three members with a red diamond sticker and burn the name tages to awaken scarecrow | There are no winners. | |
| 716 | August 25, 2024 | National Runningpic (국가대표 런닝픽) | Kim Ha-yun; Kim Min-jong; Oh Sang-uk; Park Hye-jeong; Park Sang-won | No teams | Earn coins in exchange for Running Balls to win the prize and escape penalty. | The mission was won by Yang Se-chan, Oh Sang-wook and Park Hye-jung. The winners each received the abalone set. Kim Ha-yun was exempted from the penalty by using the punishment pass. Yoo Jae-suk, Haha, Ji Suk-jin, Kim Jong-kook, Song Ji-hyo, Ji Ye-eun and Kim Min-jong each received the face printing penalty which will be released on RM's official YouTube channel and the penalizing video starts from 10 minutes and 42 seconds. | |
| 717 (Note: Yoo Jae-suk, Haha, and Song Ji-hyo's birthday special.) | September 1, 2024 | Happy Dice Day (해피 다이스 데이) | Joo Hyun-young; Kim Ah-young | No teams | Be the top three with the most birthday cake badges to receive the prize and avoid penalty | The mission was won by Haha, Kim Jong-kook and Ji Ye-eun. The winners each received the highest summer fruit sets. Yang Se-chan, whose penalty ball was drawn, had to write a birthday card which will be posted on RM's official Instagram Account with a pair of losing birthday boy/girl Yoo Jae-suk and Song Ji-hyo after the filming as a penalty. | |
| 718 | September 8, 2024 | Suyu-ri Catch Lucky (수유리 캐치 럭키) | No Guests | No teams | Earn as many gift exchange coupons as possible to increase the number of gifts that will be chosen randomly. | Mission Accomplished. | |
| 719 (Note: Chuseok Special) (Note: Ji Ye-eun did not attend the filming due to her pre-arranged schedule) | September 15, 2024 | The Unlucky Family Outing (불운 패밀리가 떴다) | Hong Jin-ho; Keum Sae-rok | Ji-hyo's Family; Parents (Song Ji-hyo, Yang Se-chan); Children (Yoo Jae-suk, Hong Jin-ho) Sae-rok's Family; Parents (Keum Sae-rok, Haha); Children (Ji Suk-jin, Kim Jong-kook) | Win missions to change the wedges of the family wheels. | The mission was won by Sae-rok's Family. The winners each received the ₩300,000 Onnuri gift certificates. | |
| 720 | September 22, 2024 | The Just Right Code (딱 맞는 코드) | Jonathan Yiombi; Kwon Eun-bi | Eun-bi Team (Kwon Eun-bi, Yoo Jae-suk, Ji Suk-jin, Song Ji-hyo); Jonathan Team (Jonathan Yiombi, Haha, Kim Jong-kook, Yang Se-chan) | Be the Top 3 with the most money that were collected via QR codes to win the prize and avoid penalty. | The mission was won by Yoo Jae-suk, Haha and Song Ji-hyo. The winners each received a box of autumn pears. Through a game of luck via QR codes, Ji Suk-jin and Kwon Eun-bi had to draw and scan a QR code after the filming as a penalty which will be released on RM's official YouTube channel and the penalizing video starts from 3 minutes and 26 seconds. | |
| 721 (Note: Ji Ye-eun returns in this episode.) (Note: Ji Ye-eun has to dressed as a Radish that was chosen by the production team after she lost the bet against Haha during the "One Gram at Your fingertips" mission three weeks ago.) | September 29, 2024 | Check your luck!－MT with Mr. Barrel (운빨 체크!－통아저씨와 함께 MT를) | Haewon (Nmixx); Kim Dong-jun (ZE:A) | No teams | Have the most pirate roulette knives to make the pirate pop out from the barrel to avoid penalty. | The mission was won by Yang Se-chan, Ji Ye-eun and Haewon. Yoo Jae-suk, Haha, Ji Suk-jin, Kim Jong-kook, Song Ji-hyo and Kim Dong-jun had to collected a bucket of marsh snails at the stream river as a penalty, but Kim Jong-kook would give his penalty spot to Ji Ye-eun instead, as he can't stay longer for the penalty and had to go early to the United States. | |
| 722 | October 6, 2024 | Alley Leader For Each Other (이 구역의 골목 대장) | No guest | Central Asian Alley; Alley Boss (Yoo Jae-suk) Jongno 3-ga Skirt Meat Alley; Alley Boss (Haha) Web Octopus Alley; Alley Boss (Ji Suk-jin) Dongdaemun Grilled Fish Alley; Alley Boss (Yang Se-chan) | Avoid being the bottom three with the lowest amount to keep away from three levels of penalty. | The mission was won by Yoo Jae-suk, Ji Suk-jin, Song Ji-hyo and Yang Se-Chan. Haha, Kim Jong-kook and Ji Ye-eun had to win a game of slap-match with citizens after the filming as a penalty which will be released on RM's official YouTube channel and the penalizing video starts from 6 seconds. | |
| 723 | October 13, 2024 | Indomitable Maintainer (불굴의 유지어터) | No guest | No teams | Maintain the total weight that were gained to avoid next week's filming schedule change. | Mission Failed with the Final total weight of 495.8 kg. since their total weight gained 7 kg, they have to start filming the next week's episode at 8 A.M. | |
| 724 | October 20, 2024 | Hierarchical Clan (서열 있는 종갓집) | Lee Yoo-mi; Woo Do-hwan | First Hierarchical Status; Kings (Yoo Jae-suk, Yang Se-chan, Lee Yoo-mi); Noble (Song Ji-hyo); Slaves (Haha, Ji Suk-jin, Kim Jong-kook, Ji Ye-eun, Woo Do-hwan); Human Wall Climb; Yoo-mi's Team (Lee Yoo-mi, Haha, Kim Jong-kook Yang Se-chan, Ji Ye-eun); Do-hwan's team (Woo Do-hwan, Yoo Jae-suk, Ji Suk-jin, Song Ji-hyo); Random Quiz; Team Kings and Noble (Yoo Jae-suk, Song Ji-hyo, Yang Se-chan, Lee Yoo-mi); Team Slaves (Haha, Ji Suk-jin, Kim Jong-kook, Ji Ye-eun, Woo Do-hwan) Second Hierarchical Status; King (Yoo Jae-suk); Nobles (Haha, Kim Jong-kook, Song Ji-hyo, Yang Se-chan, Ji Ye-eun, Lee Yoo-mi, Woo Do-hwan); Slave (Ji Suk-jin); Master of Photography (No Teams) Final Hierarchical Status; King (Woo Do-hwan); Nobles (Haha, Kim Jong-kook, Song Ji-hyo, Yang Se-chan, Ji Ye-eun, Lee Yoo-mi); Slaves (Yoo Jae-suk, Ji Suk-jin) | Being the Top 3 with the highest amount of brass coins to receive the prize but without being the bottom three with the lowest amount of brass coins to avoid penalty | The mission was won by Haha, Song Ji-hyo and Woo Do-hwan. Woo Do-hwan receives a box of honey while both Haha and Song Ji-hyo receives a box of Mandarin oranges. Yoo Jae-suk, Ji Suk-jin, and Lee Yoo-mi, who were the bottom three with the lowest amount of brass coins, had to receive the flogging penalty by the winners. | |
| 725 (Note: Lee Min-hyuk did not attend the first half of the episode due to his delayed flight.) | October 27, 2024 | Only Money For Me (돈 없인 안된다) | Kim Ah-young; Lee Min-hyuk; Seo Eun-kwang (BtoB) | Jae-suk's team (Yoo Jae-suk, Song Ji-hyo, Yang Se-chan, Ji Ye-eun, Seo Eun-kwang); Jong-kook's team (Kim Jong-kook, Haha, Ji Suk-jin, Kim Ah-young, Lee Min-hyuk) | Have the most money to avoid penalty. | The mission was won by Jong-kook's team with the total money of ₩375,000, with them received ₩ 75,000 each. Yoo Jae-suk, Song Ji-hyo, Yang Se-chan, Ji Ye-eun, Seo Eun-kwang, all of whom failed to have the most money, each received a cold water shower, with Ji Ye-eun received black ink shower instead. | |
| 726 | November 3, 2024 | Look at The Way You Believe Me (믿는 눈치 챙겨) | Hong Kyung; Kim Min-ju; Roh Yoon-seo | First Pick; Jae-suk's team (Yoo Jae-suk, Song Ji-hyo, Yang Se-chan, Kim Min-ju); Suk-jin's team (Ji Suk-jin, Haha, Roh Yoon-seo); Jong-kook's team (Kim Jong-kook, Ji Ye-eun, Hong Kyung) Final Pick; Jae-suk's team (Yoo Jae-suk, Yang Se-chan, Hong Kyung, Kim Min-ju); Suk-jin's team (Ji Suk-jin, Song Ji-hyo, Ji Ye-eun); Jong-kook's team (Kim Jong-kook, Haha, Roh Yoon-seo) | Have the highest numbers of a three-digit number to avoid penalty. | The mission was won by Jong-kook's team with a three-digit number total of 996. Roh Yoo-seo, who has the lowest number on the team, receives a box of pears. Yang Se-chan and Ji Ye-eun, whose penalty balls are drawn, have to make Chestnut Tiramisu and feed it to each other after the filming as a penalty. | |
| 727 | November 10, 2024 | The Monitor Election that Overestimates One's Ability feat. Autumn Picnic (주제넘는 반장선거 feat. 가을소풍) | Kim Dong-jun (ZE:A); Rami; Rora (Babymonster) | The person with a heart that's prettier than their faces Class President (Yoo Jae-suk); Volleyball of Extraordinary Size; Tallies team (Yoo Jae-suk, Ji Suk-jin, Kim Jong-kook, Ji Ye-eun, Rami); Shorties Team (Haha, Song Ji-hyo, Yang Se-chan, Kim Dong-jun, Rora) One who was popular in school but wasn't aware of it Class President (Kim Dong-jun); Speak in Interference Mode; Class President team (Kim Dong-jun, Yoo Jae-suk, Song Ji-hyo, Yang Se-chan, Rami); Jong-kook's Team (Kim Jong-kook, Haha, Ji Suk-jin, Ji Ye-eun, Rora) The one who won't get to be the class president in their next life Class President (Ji Ye-eun); Quiz Mission; Leadership team (Ji Ye-eun, Yoo Jae-suk, Ji Suk-jin, Kim Dong-jun, Rora); Cavengers team (Haha, Kim Jong-kook, Song Ji-hyo, Yang Se-chan, Rami) | Being the Top 2 with the most badges to receive the prize. | The mission was won by Haha, Ji Ye-eun and Rora, who are tied in the first place. The winners receives a collection of bestseller books. Rami, who had the least badges, along with Kim Jong-kook and Kim Dong-jun, whose penalty balls are drawn, have to decorate the pictures that members took at the picnic after filming as a penalty. | |
| 728 | November 17, 2024 | Decision to Trust (신뢰할 결심) | Joo Hyun-young | No teams | Help Ji Suk-jin maintain his anger to regain his long lost trust in the members until the end of the race. | There are no winners. Haha, Yang Se-chan and Ji Ye-eun, whose penalty balls are drawn, have to wash the dirty tablewares after filming as a penalty. | |
| 729 | November 24, 2024 | Such an Intimate Overseas Traveling (이토록 친밀한 해외여행) | No guest | No teams | Pick three country destinations & themes within 6 hours to win the race. | Mission Accomplished with a total remaining time of 8 minutes left. | |
| 730 (Note: Ji Ye-eun would eventually use her transfer card to gave her penalty spot to Kim Jong-kook that she had since episode 721, but later she was given a penalty spot by Yang Se-chan who use his transfer card from the race two weeks ago, but was also given a penalty spot by Haha who use the transfer card that he stole from Ji Suk-jin.) | December 1, 2024 | Choose your Odd/Even Choice Wisely (현명한 홀짝 선택) | Dahyun (Twice); Kyuhyun (Super Junior) | Mission Team (Yoo Jae-suk, Haha, Ji Suk-jin, Song Ji-hyo, Yang Se-chan, Ji Ye-eun, Kyuhyun); Mafia Team (Kim Jong-kook, Dahyun) | Without penalty balls were drawn by production team to avoid penalty. | The mission was won by Yoo Jae-suk, Ji Suk-jin, Kim Jong-kook, Song Ji-hyo and Dahyun. Kim Jong-kook, Yang Se-chan and Ji Ye-eun, who were chosen by the Transfer Cards, along with Kyuhyun, whose penalty ball was drawn, have to find and took a picture with three students who took the CSAT this year after the filming as a penalty. Final Penalty Ball Counts: Rank / Player / Amount; 1 / Yoo Jae-suk / 4; 2 / Haha / 4; 3 / Kim Jong-kook / 4; 4 / Yang Se-chan / 4; 5 / Dahyun / 4; 6 / Kyuhyun / 4; 7 / Song Ji-hyo / 5; 8 / Ji Ye-eun / 6; 9 / Ji Suk-jin / 8 | |
| 731 (Note: Christmas Special) (Note: Year-End Party Special) | December 8, 2024 | The invitation doesn't go as planned (초대장은 계획대로 되지 않아) | No guest | No teams | Make a plan for a detailed schedule for 2 days and 1 night year-end party. | Mission Accomplished with the location is on the 200 km radius of Sangnam. | |
| 732 | December 15, 2024 | Cool Running Year-End Party (쏘쿨한 런닝 연말 파티) | No guest | No teams | Main Mission: Without being in the top three to sleep outdoors. Main Side Mission: Without being in the first three people to wake up at 6 AM. | Main Mission: The mission was won by Kim Jong-kook, Haha, Yang Se-chan and Ji Ye-eun. Yoo Jae-suk, whose penalty ball was drawn, Ji Suk-jin who failed on the missions, and Ji Ye-eun, who were chosen by the Transfer Card, had to sleep outdoors in the night as a penalty. Main Side Mission: Yoo Jae-suk, Haha and Song Ji-hyo, who were the first three people to wake up at 6 AM, had to find a restaurant and buy foods for the entire members as a penalty. | |
| 733 (Note: Yoo Jae-suk's transfer card, that he had since episode 728, was stolen by Ji Suk-jin in the early part of episode 731, who were later got stolen by Haha in the later part of episode 731. Haha's transfer card was stolen by Yang Se-chan, who was the guest in Haha's radio show before the shooting of episode 732. Eventually Yang Se-chan gives his transfer card to Song Ji-hyo, who used it to give the penalty to Ji Ye-eun.) (Note: Ji Ye-eun's first episode as member.) | December 22, 2024 | The Cool Running Year-End Party Part 2 (쏘쿨한 런닝 연말 파티 下) | No guest | No teams | Main Mission: Without being in the top three to sleep outdoors. Main Side Mission: Without being in the first three people to wake up at 6 AM. | Main Mission: The mission was won by Kim Jong-kook, Haha, Yang Se-chan and Ji Ye-eun. Yoo Jae-suk, whose penalty ball was drawn, Ji Suk-jin who failed on the missions, and Ji Ye-eun, who were chosen by the Transfer Card, had to sleep outdoors in the night as a penalty. Main Side Mission: Yoo Jae-suk, Haha and Song Ji-hyo, who were the first three people to wake up at 6 AM, had to find a restaurant and buy foods for the entire members as a penalty. | |

== Viewership ==
Running Man : South Korea viewers per episode (thousands)

| 2024 | Episode number | | | | | | | | | | | | |
| 2024 | 1 | 2 | 3 | 4 | 5 | 6 | 7 | 8 | 9 | 10 | 11 | 12 | 13 |
|---|---|---|---|---|---|---|---|---|---|---|---|---|---|
| 686-698 | 851 | 1109 | 909 | 949 | 971 | 880 | 901 | 818 | 943 | 847 | 800 | 902 | 720 |
| 699–711 | 840 | 685 | 784 | 785 | 723 | 900 | 803 | 969 | 634 | 887 | 732 | 856 | 816 |
| 712–724 | 885 | 782 | 843 | 715 | 1081 | 890 | 977 | 715 | 828 | 816 | 891 | 943 | 836 |
| 725–733 | 782 | 724 | 885 | 929 | 862 | 978 | 837 | 1020 | 994 | – | | | |

Source: Audience measurement performed nationwide by Nielsen Media Research.

Average TV viewership ratings
| Ep. | Original broadcast date | Average audience share | |
| Ep. | Original broadcast date | Nielsen Korea | |
| Ep. | Original broadcast date | Nationwide | Seoul |
|---|---|---|---|
| 686 | January 7, 2024 | 3.4% (21st) | 3.7% (18th) |
| 687 | January 14, 2024 | 4.2% (14th) | 4.5% (12th) |
| 688 | January 21, 2024 | 4.2% (14th) | 4.8% (12th) |
| 689 | January 28, 2024 | 4.2% (11th) | 4.6% (8th) |
| 690 | February 4, 2024 | 4.1% (12th) | 4.5% (12th) |
| 691 | February 11, 2024 | 3.2% (19th) | 3.5% (12th) |
| 692 | February 18, 2024 | 3.6% (13th) | 4.2% (10th) |
| 693 | February 25, 2024 | 3.4% (14th) | 3.9% (12th) |
| 694 | March 3, 2024 | 3.5% (14th) | 3.9% (12th) |
| 695 | March 10, 2024 | 3.7% (11th) | 4.1% (10th) |
| 696 | March 17, 2024 | 3.3% (12th) | 3.6% (11th) |
| 697 | March 24, 2024 | 3.5% (12th) | 4.0% (10th) |
| 698 | March 31, 2024 | 3.1% (16th) | 3.4% (13th) |
| 699 | April 7, 2024 | 3.9% (9th) | 4.5% (8th) |
| 700 | April 14, 2024 | 3.0% (15th) | 3.2% (13th) |
| 701 | April 21, 2024 | 3.5% (13th) | 3.9% (11th) |
| 702 | April 28, 2024 | 3.4% (12th) | 3.8% (10th) |
| 703 | May 5, 2024 | 3.2% (14th) | 3.5% (11th) |
| 704 | May 12, 2024 | 4.0% (10th) | 4.4% (7th) |
| 705 | May 19, 2024 | 3.7% (10th) | 4.1% (9th) |
| 706 | May 26, 2024 | 4.0% (9th) | 4.5% (8th) |
| 707 | June 2, 2024 | 3.2% (13th) | 3.7% (10th) |
| 708 | June 9, 2024 | 3.9% (8th) | 4.2% (6th) |
| 709 | June 16, 2024 | 3.2% (13th) | 3.8% (8th) |
| 710 | June 23, 2024 | 3.5% (10th) | 3.8% (10th) |
| 711 | June 30, 2024 | 3.3% (15th) | 3.6% (11th) |
| 712 | July 7, 2024 | 3.6% (13th) | 3.9% (12th) |
| 713 | July 14, 2024 | 3.3% (13th) | 3.8% (9th) |
| 714 | July 21, 2024 | 3.3% (14th) | 3.5% (10th) |
| 715 | August 18, 2024 | 2.9% (23th) | 3.3% (16th) |
| 716 | August 25, 2024 | 4.5% (9th) | 5.7% (6th) |
| 717 | September 1, 2024 | 3.9% (12th) | 4.8% (8th) |
| 718 | September 8, 2024 | 3.9% (11th) | 4.6% (9th) |
| 719 | September 15, 2024 | 3.3% (14th) | 4.0% (9th) |
| 720 | September 22, 2024 | 3.2% (16th) | 3.7% (11th) |
| 721 | September 29, 2024 | 3.6% (12th) | 3.9% (10th) |
| 722 | October 6, 2024 | 3.9% (12th) | 4.4% (10th) |
| 723 | October 13, 2024 | 3.9% (13th) | 4.6% (9th) |
| 724 | October 20, 2024 | 3.6% (13th) | 3.9% (10th) |
| 725 | October 27, 2024 | 3.5% (12th) | 4.0% (11th) |
| 726 | November 3, 2024 | 3.4% (11th) | 3.6% (12th) |
| 727 | November 10, 2024 | 3.5% (11th) | 4.0% (9th) |
| 728 | November 17, 2024 | 4.2% (12th) | 4.8% (7th) |
| 729 | November 24, 2024 | 3.5% (15th) | 4.0% (12th) |
| 730 | December 1, 2024 | 4.2% (10th) | 4.9% (8th) |
| 731 | December 8, 2024 | 4.0% (11th) | 4.8% (10th) |
| 732 | December 15, 2024 | 4.3% (10th) | 4.7% (10th) |
| 733 | December 22, 2024 | 4.2% (13th) | 4.6% (11th) |
In the table above, the blue numbers represent the lowest ratings and the red numbers represent the highest ratings.
