= Renhat railway station =

Railway station in Madhya Pradesh, India

Renhat

General information
- Location: Renhat, Ghatigaon, Gwalior district, Madhya Pradesh; India
- Coordinates: 25°58′48″N 77°50′01″E
- Elevation: 342 m (1,122 ft)
- System: Passenger train station
- Owner: Indian Railways
- Operator: West Central Railway
- Line: Indore–Gwalior line
- Platforms: 1
- Tracks: 1

Construction
- Structure type: Standard (on ground station)

Other information
- Status: Active
- Station code: RENH
- Zone(s): West Central Railway zone
- Division(s): Bhopal

History
- Opened: 1899
- Former names: Gwalior Light Railway

Services
Preceding station	Indian Railways	Following station
Ghatigaon towards ?	West Central Railway zone Indore–Gwalior line	Mohana towards ?
Location

Renhat railway station is a railway station on Indore–Gwalior line under the Bhopal railway division of West Central Railway zone. This is situated at Renhat, Ghatigaon in Gwalior district of the Indian state of Madhya Pradesh.
