= ShareChat =

Indian social networking service

- Developer: Mohalla Tech
- Release: October 2015; 11 years ago

Stable release(s)
- Android: 2026.5.6 / 4 February 2026; 8 months ago
- iOS: 25.4 0 / 1 December 2025; 11 months ago
- Operating system: iOS; Android
- Size: 178.5 MB (iOS); 97 MB (Android)
- Available in: 15 languages
- List of languages: Assamese; Bengali; Bhojpuri; Gujarati; Haryanvi; Hindi; Kannada; Malayalam; Marathi; Odia; Punjabi; Rajasthani; Tamil; Telugu; English
- Type: Social media; Social networking service; Internet; Image sharing; Video sharing; Instant messaging; Chatroom
- Licence: Freeware
- Website: sharechat.com

ShareChat is an Indian social networking service platform, owned by Bangalore-based Mohalla Tech. It was founded by Ankush Sachdeva, Bhanu Pratap Singh and Farid Ahsan, and incorporated on 8 January 2015. ShareChat app has over 350 million monthly active users across 15 Indian languages. In 2022, the company was valued at $5 billion.

== History ==
ShareChat's holding company, Mohalla Tech Pvt Ltd, was incorporated in January 2015 by graduates from Indian Institutes of Technology Kanpur: Ankush Sachdeva, Bhanu Pratap Singh and Farid Ahsan. The company is headquartered in Bengaluru, Karnataka, and as of 2020, employed over 2,500 people.

Initially, ShareChat primarily worked as a content sharing platform, without any scope of users generating their own content. In April 2016, however, ShareChat enabled user-generated content creation on its platform, allowing its users to share their own posters and creative content. At around the same time, it also introduced open tagging for users, which would allow anyone to create their own hashtags depending on the content.

In March 2019, Mohalla Tech acquired the short video platform Clip from Transversal Tech. On 17 April 2019, ShareChat announced that it took down around half a million pieces of content and removed 54,000 accounts for spreading fake news, hate speech and spam, and for conducting coordinated misinformation campaigns.

In February 2020, it acquired the Bengaluru-based online fashion marketplace Elanic. In March 2020, it acquired the meme platform Memer. In August 2020, it acquired a hyperlocal information platform, Circle Internet.

Mohalla Tech also bought the short video platform MX TakaTak from Times Internet Group for $700 million in one of the biggest acquisitions of 2022.

In January 2023, Farid Ahsan and Bhanu Pratap Singh stepped down from their respective roles as Chief Operating Officer and Chief Technology Officer. As of 2022, Manohar Singh Charan (CFO) and Amit Zunjarwad (CPO) led the management along with Ankush Sachdeva (CEO).

== Funding ==
In September 2020, ShareChat raised $40 million from investors Pawan Munjal of Hero MotoCorp, Ajay Shridhar Shriram of DCM Shriram, Twitter, SAIF Partners, Lightspeed Ventures, and India Quotient. By April 2021, ShareChat had raised $500 million from investors and was valued at over $2 billion. In May 2022, ShareChat raised $300 million from Google, Times Group and Temasek Holdings at a valuation of $5 billion.

== Issues ==
In 2018, ShareChat accused ByteDance of copying its design and UI in their social media platform Helo. Following Delhi High Court's direction, ByteDance changed its design for Helo.

In May 2020, ShareChat laid off 101 employees. The company announced that it rehired over 50% of the laid-off workforce after the launch of the video platform Moj. In December 2022, ShareChat laid off another 5% of its workforce. In January 2023, ShareChat again laid off 400 employees which was around 20% of its workforce. In December 2023, ShareChat further fired 200 employees, around 15% of its workforce, to cut costs and achieve profitability.

== Apps ==
=== ShareChat ===
ShareChat is multilingual social media platform, which includes audio chat rooms, photo and video posts, status updates, microblogging, blogging, and direct messaging in 15 Indian languages.

=== Moj ===
Moj is a short-video platform launched by ShareChat on 29 June 2020. It emulates the features of TikTok, which was among the apps banned by the Indian government in June 2020. In a tweet, Ankush Sachdeva, co-founder and CEO of ShareChat, said the app was coded in 30 hours. It received Google Play Best of 2020 Awards. Moj has over 160 million monthly active users.

=== QuickTV ===
QuickTV is a microdrama platform released by ShareChat in 2025.
