= Kiat =

Kiat or KIAT may refer to:

- Korea Institute for Advancement of Technology, South Korean think tank

== People ==
- Kiat Songsanant, Thai film director
