= List of Running Man episodes (2023) =

- No. of episodes: 52 episodes + 1 Special

Release
- Original network: SBS
- Original release: January 1 – December 31, 2023

Season chronology
- ← Previous; 2022 Next → 2024

This is a list of episodes of the South Korean variety show Running Man in 2023. The show airs on SBS as part of their Good Sunday lineup.

== Episodes ==
List of episodes broadcast in 2023 (635–Special)
Ep.	Airdate	Title	Guest(s)	Teams	Mission	Results	Ref.
635	January 1, 2023	Running Man Outing (런닝맨이 떴다)	Joo Woo-jae	No Teams	Be the top two to receive the prize.	The mission was won by Jeon So-min and Joo Woo-jae, with Jeon So-min receiving two gold rabbit prizes, and Joo Woo-jae receiving one gold rabbit prize.	
636	January 8, 2023	Running Man Outing II (런닝맨이 떴다 II)	Joo Woo-jae	No Teams	Be the top two to receive the prize.	The mission was won by Jeon So-min and Joo Woo-jae, with Jeon So-min receiving two gold rabbit prizes, and Joo Woo-jae receiving one gold rabbit prize.	
637	January 15, 2023	Sparkling Salary Race (불꽃 튀는 연봉 레이스)	Choi Doo-ho; Choo Sung-hoon; Jung Chan-sung; Kim Dong-hyun	Yoo Jae-suk Team (Yoo Jae-suk, Haha, Jeon So-min, Choi Doo-ho, Choo Sung-hoon, Jung Chan-sung) Yang Se-chan Team (Yang Se-chan, Ji Suk-jin, Kim Jong-kook, Song Ji-hyo, Kim Dong-hyun)	Have the most salary between the teams to receive the prize.	The mission was won by Yang Se-chan, Choo Sung-hoon and Choi Doo-ho. Yoo Jae-suk, Song Ji-hyo, and Jeon So-min received the penalty, with Yoo Jae-suk getting low kicked while Song Ji-hyo and Jeon So-min were required to cross-stitch a gemstone.	
638	January 22, 2023	That is a Tattered Conglomerate Family (박 터지는 재벌집)	Kim Shin-rok	A Team (Yoo Jae-suk, Ji Suk-jin, Jeon So-min, Yang Se-chan) B Team (Kim Jong-kook, Haha, Song Ji-hyo, Kim Shin-rok)	Be the chairman and the vice chairman of the conglomerate group.	The mission was won by Yoo Jae-suk and Yang Se-chan, with the former becoming the vice chairman and the latter becoming the chairman. Yoo Jae-suk received honey gift set and Yang Se-chan received Korean beef set as prizes.	
639	January 29, 2023	Liverless Rabbit (간 없는 토끼)	An Yu-jin; Gaeul; Jang Won-young; Leeseo; Liz; Rei (Ive)	Ordinary Rabbits Team (All other members) Liverless Rabbit Team (An Yu-jin)	Ordinary Rabbits Team Guess who is the liverless rabbit to receive the prize. Liverless Rabbit Team Win the race without letting the ordinary rabbits find out about your identity.	The mission was won by An Yu-jin, Gaeul, Liz and Rei. An Yu-jin was the liverless rabbit. The winners received chocolates and macaroons as prizes, while the losers had to record a video to promote Running Man new airtime as a penalty which will be posted on RM's official Instagram Account.	
640	February 5, 2023	The Colourful Martial Arts Master (컬러풀 무림 고수)	Donnie Yen; Jang Hyuk	No teams	Win the pirate barrel game.	The mission won by Jang Hyuk. He received an autographed gift set consisting of a full set of Ip Man films, and two biographies written by Donnie Yen about Ip Man and Chinese kung fu, respectively. Donnie Yen also received a gift set containing his nametag as an appreciation for his appearance.	
640	February 5, 2023	The Golden MT Time I (금쪽같은 MT 시간 I)	No guest	No teams	Follow the MT retreat schedule created by the staff to win different prizes, including the penalty transfer cards, throughout the schedule.	There are no winners. Song Ji-hyo initially received a penalty transfer card which was later stolen by Yang Se-chan during the final mission in the retreat schedule. Hence, he received two penalty transfer cards that allows him to transfer future penalties to other members.	
641	February 12, 2023	The Golden MT Time II (금쪽같은 MT 시간 II)	No guest	No teams	Follow the MT retreat schedule created by the staff to win different prizes, including the penalty transfer cards, throughout the schedule.	There are no winners. Song Ji-hyo initially received a penalty transfer card which was later stolen by Yang Se-chan during the final mission in the retreat schedule. Hence, he received two penalty transfer cards that allows him to transfer future penalties to other members.	
642 (Note: Special appearances by KCM, Wonstein, and Parc Jae-jung (MSG Wannabe's M.O.M.) (Only appeared in the opening segment))	February 19, 2023	Winter Festival (윈터 페스티벌)	Byul; Heo Kyung-hwan; Seogy	Seogy Team (Seogy, Yoo Jae-suk, Haha) Byul Team (Byul, Ji Suk-jin, Song Ji-hyo, Yang Se-chan) Kyung-hwan Team (Heo Kyung-hwan, Kim Jong-kook, Jeon So-min)	Catch two small fish at a frozen pond in order to go home.	There are no winners. Seogy Team was the first to complete the mission, followed by Byul Team, with Kyung-hwan Team the last to complete.	
643	February 26, 2023	Butler's Days I (집사의 하루 I)	Cha Tae-hyun; Yoo Yeon-seok	Master Cha Team (Cha Tae-hyun, Yoo Jae-suk) Butler Team (Haha, Ji Suk-jin, Kim Jong-kook, Song Ji-hyo, Jeon So-min, Yang Se-chan, Yoo Yeon-seok)	Satisfy Master Cha to earn R Coins.	The mission was won by Yoo Jae-suk, Song Ji-hyo and Cha Tae-hyun. The winners each received a strawberry gift set. Ji Suk-jin, whose penalty ball was drawn by Yoo Jae-suk, had to make 30 banana puddings after the filming as a penalty.	
644	March 5, 2023	Butler's Days II (집사의 하루 II)	Cha Tae-hyun; Yoo Yeon-seok	Master Cha Team (Cha Tae-hyun, Yoo Jae-suk) Butler Team (Haha, Ji Suk-jin, Kim Jong-kook, Song Ji-hyo, Jeon So-min, Yang Se-chan, Yoo Yeon-seok)	Satisfy Master Cha to earn R Coins.	The mission was won by Yoo Jae-suk, Song Ji-hyo and Cha Tae-hyun. The winners each received a strawberry gift set. Ji Suk-jin, whose penalty ball was drawn by Yoo Jae-suk, had to make 30 banana puddings after the filming as a penalty.	
644	March 5, 2023	Suk-jin's Treat (석진이가 쏜다)	No guest	No teams	Spin the roulette to choose who has to pay for the meal.	Ji Suk-jin must pay for the members' and staffs' meals.	
645	March 12, 2023	Crash Course in Bad Hand (일타 수(手) 캔들)	Joo Woo-jae; Roh Yoon-seo	Yoo Jae-suk Team (Yoo Jae-suk, Haha, Song Ji-hyo, Joo Woo-jae, Roh Yoon-seo) Ji Suk-jin Team (Ji Suk-jin, Kim Jong-kook, Jeon So-min, Yang Se-chan)	Have the most R Coins among both teams to receive the prize.	The mission was won by Yoo Jae-suk, Yang Se-chan and Roh Yoon-seo. Through a game of luck, Song Ji-hyo, Jeon So-min and Joo Woo-jae squeezed sponges filled with ink on their faces as a penalty.	
646	March 19, 2023	Dongducheon Class (동두천 클라쓰)	No guests	No teams	Choose 2 Credit Cards R For Withdraw Before Receive Penalty	The mission was won by Yoo Jae-suk, Haha, Ji Suk-jin, Kim Jong-kook and Song Ji-hyo. Jeon So-min and Yang Se-chan received the barber shop styling penalty.	
647	March 26, 2023	Just right! Now Suitable for Camping (딱! 지금 하기 좋은 캠핑)	No guests	No teams	5 Running Man members who flip the R Ddakji will be exampted from penalty	The mission was won by Yoo Jae-suk, Kim Jong-kook, Song Ji-hyo, Jeon So-min and Yang Se-chan. Haha and Ji Suk-jin must go to a strawberry farm and pick strawberries after the filming as a penalty.	
648	April 2, 2023	Just right! Now Suitable for Camping Part.2 (딱! 지금 하기 좋은 캠핑 下)	No guests	No teams	5 Running Man members who flip the R Ddakji will be exampted from penalty	The mission was won by Yoo Jae-suk, Kim Jong-kook, Song Ji-hyo, Jeon So-min and Yang Se-chan. Haha and Ji Suk-jin must go to a strawberry farm and pick strawberries after the filming as a penalty.	
649	April 9, 2023	Do You Know the Flower Scholar? (꽃선비를 아시나요?)	Kang Hoon; Shin Ye-eun	Kook's Family (Kim Jong-kook, Yoo Jae-suk, Yang Se-chan, Kang Hoon) Ye-eun's Family (Shin Ye-eun, Ji Suk-jin, Song Ji-hyo, Jeon So-min) Fake Scholar (Haha)	Flower Scholar Team; Guess who is the fake scholar and guess right the talent cards to receive the prize. Fake Scholar; Win the race without letting the Flower Scholars find out about your identity to receive the prize.	The mission was won by Kim Jong-kook, Yang Se-chan and Kang Hoon. The winners each received the fruits gift set. Haha received the water slap penalty.	
650	April 16, 2023	Running Man in the Philippines (런닝맨 in 필리핀)	No Guests	No Teams	TBA	Mission Accomplished	
651	April 23, 2023	No Coin No Gain (노 코인 노 게인)	Manny Pacquiao; Ryan Bang	No Teams	Earn R Coins to enjoy the resort and get a chance to sleep in the suite.	The mission was won by Ji Suk-jin, Kim Jong-kook, Song Ji-hyo and Yang Se-chan. Yoo Jae-suk, Haha and Jeon So-min must stay outside of the resort for a few more hours as a penalty.	
652	April 30, 2023	Running Tour Project (런닝투어 프로젝트)	No Guests	No Teams	Roll the highest number in a dice throw.	The mission was won by Song Ji-hyo and Yang Se-chan.	
653	May 7, 2023	Age Notice Picture Exhibition (연령고지 그림 전시회)	No Guests	A Team (Yoo Jae-suk, Ji Suk-jin, Kim Jong-kook) B Team (Haha & Jeon So-min) C Team (Song Ji-hyo & Yang Se-chan)	The last drawing that is not completed shredded becomes the new Age Notice concept.	The mission was won by A Team. Yoo Jae-suk dressed as a jimmy jib mic, Haha dressed as a boom mic, Ji Suk-jin dressed as an E.T. alien in a suit, Kim Jong-kook dressed as Ma Dong-seok, Song Ji-hyo dressed as Toshio, Jeon So-min dressed as a lobster and Yang Se-chan dressed as a monkfish.	
654	May 14, 2023	Age Notice Picture Exhibition Part.2 (연령고지 그림 전시회 下)	No Guests	A Team (Yoo Jae-suk, Ji Suk-jin, Kim Jong-kook) B Team (Haha & Jeon So-min) C Team (Song Ji-hyo & Yang Se-chan)	The last drawing that is not completed shredded becomes the new Age Notice concept.	The mission was won by A Team. Yoo Jae-suk dressed as a jimmy jib mic, Haha dressed as a boom mic, Ji Suk-jin dressed as an E.T. alien in a suit, Kim Jong-kook dressed as Ma Dong-seok, Song Ji-hyo dressed as Toshio, Jeon So-min dressed as a lobster and Yang Se-chan dressed as a monkfish.	
655	May 21, 2023	2023 Choice of So-min (2023 소민이의 선택)	Jo Se-ho; Kang Hoon	No Teams	2 members have a chance to go on a date with Jeon So-min.	The mission was won by Haha and Jo Se-Ho. Jeon So-min has a course meal with both Haha and Jo Se-Ho.	
656	May 28, 2023	You're My Fool (너는 나의 봉이다)	Kim Dong-hyun	Se-chan Team (Yang Se-chan, Yoo Jae-suk, Kim Jong-kook, Song Ji-hyo) Dong-hyun Team (Kim Dong-hyun, Haha, Ji Suk-jin, Jeon So-min)	Earn the greatest score. Golden eggs are worth +1 points and fake eggs are worth -1 points.	The mission was won by Ji Suk-Jin. Yang Se Chan was placed last but he used the transfer card and gave the penalty to Ji Suk-jin. Ji Suk-jin chooses Yoo Jae-Suk to make the members' Cheer Sticks after the filming as a penalty.	
657	June 4, 2023	Ji-hyo's Detox Tour (지효의 디톡스 투어)	No Guests	No Teams	Earn the most Running Balls for a draw from Song Ji-hyo to decide who will have their next trip after her.	Kim Jong-Kook had the most balls and Ji Suk-jin had the least. Yoo Jae-Suk was picked as the member whose trip will be next	
658	June 11, 2023	I'm Single's Inferno (나는 솔로 지옥)	DEX; Han Ji-eun; Lee Se-hee	No Teams	Scroll From Heart to Heart Partner Will be The Winner	The mission was won by Haha, Kim Jong-kook, Song Ji-hyo, DEX, Han Ji-eun and Lee Se-hee. Yoo Jae-suk, Ji Suk-jin, Yang Se-chan and Jeon So-min's faces will be drawn by the Running Man Members as a penalty which will be posted on RM's official Instagram Account.	
659	June 18, 2023	I'm Single's Inferno (나는 솔로 지옥)	DEX; Han Ji-eun; Lee Se-hee	No Teams	Scroll From Heart to Heart Partner Will be The Winner	The mission was won by Haha, Kim Jong-kook, Song Ji-hyo, DEX, Han Ji-eun and Lee Se-hee. Yoo Jae-suk, Ji Suk-jin, Yang Se-chan and Jeon So-min's faces will be drawn by the Running Man Members as a penalty which will be posted on RM's official Instagram Account.	
659	June 18, 2023	The Lucky 29th (운수 좋은 29일)	No Guests	No Teams	Between Odd Or Even Number Will be The Winner	The mission was won by Haha, Jeon So-min and Yang Se-chan	
660	June 25, 2023	Heating with Noodles (이열치면)	No Guests	No Teams	Complete a Bingo board of summer noodle dishes by asking pedestrians for recommendations.	Mission Accomplished	
661	July 2, 2023	'Go Away, Age' Party (나이야 가라 파티)	Joohoney (Monsta X); Yun Sung-bin	Jong-kook's Team (Kim Jong-kook, Yoo Jae-suk, Song Ji-hyo, Joohoney) Sung-bin's Family (Yun Sung-bin, Haha, Ji Suk-jin, Jeon So-min, Yang Se-chan)	As a team, earn the most R Coins.	The mission was won by Jong-kook's Team. Jong-kook's Team had the chance to throw R Coins and win any reward the coins landed on.	
662	July 9, 2023	Running Scout (런닝 스카우트)	Dae-ho Lee; Hwang Kwang-hee (ZE:A)	Member Team (Haha, Ji Suk-jin, Kim Jong-kook, Song Ji-hyo, Jeon So-min, Lee Dae-ho, Hwang Kwang-hee) Captain (Yang Se-chan) Villain (Yoo Jae-suk)	Scout Team & Captain Mission: Eliminate the Villain Villain Mission: Eliminate the Captain	The mission was won by Yoo Jae-suk.	
663 (Note: 13th Anniversary SBS Running Man Special)	July 16, 2023	Along with Veterans Joseon Dynasty Edition (조선판 꾼과 함께)	No Guests	No Teams	Earn the greatest number of candies.	The mission was won by Kim Jong-kook. All the other members had to make Rope shoes after the filming as a penalty.	
664	July 23, 2023	Yoo Jae-suk's Cultural Heritage Inspection Diary (유재석의 문화유산답사기)	No Guests	No Teams	Earn the most Running Balls for a draw from Yoo Jae-suk to decide who will have their next trip after Jae-suk	Jeon So-min was picked by Yoo Jae-suk will be the next trip	
665	July 30, 2023	Summer Vacation: Running Man Outing (여름방학 편－런닝맨이 떴다)	No Guests	No Teams	Complete all writing diary note book until end of filming	The Mission was won by Song Ji-hyo	
666	August 6, 2023	Summer Vacation: Running Man Outing (Part 2) (여름방학 편－런닝맨이 떴다 (하))	No Guests	No Teams	Complete all writing diary note book until end of filming	The Mission was won by Song Ji-hyo	
667	August 13, 2023	Summer Vacation in Fishing Village: Running Man Outing (여름방학 어촌편－런닝맨이 떴다)	No Guests	No Teams	Earn the most Running Balls for a draw pick one member will be most coin island will be the winner	The Mission was won by Yoo Jae-suk, Haha, Song Ji-hyo, Jeon So-min and Yang Se-chan. Ji Suk-jin and Kim Jong-kook received the octopus fishing penalty in the morning of the next day.	
668	August 20, 2023	Summer Vacation in Fishing Village: Running Man Outing Part 2 (여름방학 어촌편－런닝맨이 떴다 (中))	No Guests	No Teams	Earn the most Running Balls for a draw pick one member will be most coin island will be the winner	The Mission was won by Yoo Jae-suk, Haha, Song Ji-hyo, Jeon So-min and Yang Se-chan. Ji Suk-jin and Kim Jong-kook received the octopus fishing penalty in the morning of the next day.	
669	August 27, 2023	Midsummer Nights Detective (한여름 밤의 명탐정)	Kang Hoon	Yellow Team (Yoo Jae-suk & Ji Suk-jin) Green Team (Haha & Kim Jong-kook) Orange Team (Song Ji-hyo & Yang Se-chan) Blue Team (Jeon So-min & Kang Hoon)	Find the clue inside the haunted complex and rip the suspect's name tag.	The mission was won by Yellow and Green Team. Yoo Jae-suk, Haha, Ji Suk-jin and Kim Jong-kook will receive 1 set of Irwin.	
670	September 3, 2023	Midsummer Nights Detective (한여름 밤의 명탐정)	Kang Hoon	Yellow Team (Yoo Jae-suk & Ji Suk-jin) Green Team (Haha & Kim Jong-kook) Orange Team (Song Ji-hyo & Yang Se-chan) Blue Team (Jeon So-min & Kang Hoon)	Find the clue inside the haunted complex and rip the suspect's name tag.	The mission was won by Yellow and Green Team. Yoo Jae-suk, Haha, Ji Suk-jin and Kim Jong-kook will receive 1 set of Irwin.	
671	September 10, 2023	Vtopia That Eats Up The Ground (땅따먹는 뷔토피아)	V (BTS)	No Team	Be the most highest tally number will be the winner.	The Mission was won in the order - V, Song Ji-hyo, Kim Jong-kook, Yoo Jae-suk, Jeon So-min, Yang Se-chan and Ji Suk-jin. Song Ji-hyo and V each received Korean beef sets as a prize.	
672	September 17, 2023	Money Road in Daehangno (머니 로드 in 대학로)	No Guest	No Team	Be the most highest money inside envalope will be the winner.	The mission won by Yoo Jae-suk and Yang Se-chan. Yoo Jae-suk will receive 7,510 won in cash.	
673	September 24, 2023	Amnesia Couple Battle (기억상실 커플 대전)	Jung So-min; Kang Ha-neul	One-Sided Crush Team (Yoo Jae-suk, Haha, Kim Jong-kook, Song Ji-hyo, Jung So-min) Popular Guy (Yang Se-chan) Popular Girl (Ji Suk-jin) Popular Guy's Girlfriend (Jeon So-min) Popular Girl's Boyfriend (Kang Ha-Neul)	Find the right couple to win the race.	The mission was won by Kim Jong-kook and Jung So-min. The winners will receive 2 fruit sets. Haha, Ji Suk-jin, Jeon So-min, Yang Se-chan and Kang Ha-neul, who failed to find the right couple had to write a letter to their lovers which will be posted on RM's official Instagram Account after the filming as a penalty .	
674	October 8, 2023	"Yoo" are my Leader ('유' are my 팀장)	Kim Dong-hwi; Yoo Seung-ho; Yoo Su-bin	Yoo Jae-suk Team (Yoo Jae-suk, Kim Jong-kook, Jeon So-min, Kim Dong-hwi, Yoo Su-bin) Yoo Seung-ho Team (Yoo Seung-ho, Haha, Ji Suk-jin, Song Ji-hyo, Yang Se-chan)	Have the most money in the brief case without being the Bottom 3 with the least money to win the race.	The mission was won by Yoo Jae-suk Team. Yoo Jae-suk, Kim Dong-hwi and Yoo Su-bin each received the highest pine mushroom sets. Through a game of luck, Ji Suk-jin and Yang Se-chan received water shower penalty.	
675	October 15, 2023	The Escape of the Ten (10인의 탈출)	Lee Joon; Uhm Ki-joon; Yoon Jong-hoon	No Teams	Have to guess your own crime to escape penalty.	The mission was won by Yoo Jae-suk, Ji Suk-jin, Kim Jong-kook, Song Ji-hyo, Jeon So-min, Yang Se-chan, Lee Joon and Yoon Jong-hoon. The winners each receive red bean jelly sets. Haha and Uhm Ki-joon, who failed to guess their crimes, received the water bomb penalty.	
676	October 22, 2023	Few Heaven (소수의 헤븐)	DK; Hoshi; Seung-kwan (BSS)	No Teams	Have to pick Paradise over Inferno and earn R Coins in exchange for Running Balls to escape penalty.	There are no winners. Hoshi and Seung-kwan, whose penalty ball was drawn, had to exercise in the ladder treadmill as a penalty.	
677	October 29, 2023	Autumn Food Party (가을미식회)	Mimi (Oh My Girl); Miyeon ((G)I-dle)	Non-singer Team (Yoo Jae-suk, Song Ji-hyo, Jeon So-min, Yang Se-chan) Singer Team (Haha, Ji Suk-jin, Kim Jong-kook, Mimi, Miyeon)	Earn the most price badges to win the prize and avoid penalty.	The mission was won by Kim Jong-kook and Song Ji-hyo. The winners each receive chestnut jam sets. Yoo Jae-suk and Mimi, whose penalty ball was drawn by Mimi and Miyeon, had to peel 10 chestnuts after the filming as a penalty.	
678	November 5, 2023	The Dream of a Million Dollars (백만 원의 꿈)	No Guests	No Teams	Find the prize envelope to win the prize and find also the debt envelope to write the names who would receive the penalty.	The mission was won by Yoo Jae-suk. The winner receive ₩ 100,000, but Yoo Jae-suk gave the prize to Jeon So-min. Jeon So-min and Yang Se-chan, whose names are in the debt envelope, received the stream water penalty.	
679 (Note: Jeon So-min's last episode as a member.)	November 12, 2023	Goodbye So-Min (굿바이 소민)	No Guests	No Teams	Collect as many badges to avoid penalty.	The mission was won by Yoo Jae-suk, Kim Jong-kook and Yang Se-chan. The winners will not get picked in the penalty. Haha, whose penalty ball was drawn by Jeon So-min, has to wear a servant clothes in Singapore as a penalty.	
680	November 19, 2023	Do You Want to Win The SGP Championship? (우승이 하고 싶으싱가SGP?)	Hong Jin-ho; Shin Ye-eun	Jin-ho Team (Hong Jin-ho, Yoo Jae-suk, Song Ji-hyo, Yang Se-chan) Ye-eun Team (Shin Ye-eun, Haha, Ji Suk-jin, Kim Jong-kook)	Pick the numbers from 1-10 and the total should be lower than 52. The bottom two with the fewest penalty tickets will win the prize while the top two with the most penalty tickets will receive the penalty.	The mission was won by Yoo Jae-suk and Yang Se-chan. The winners will get to sleep in a luxurious rooms as a prize. Hong Jin-ho and Shin Ye-eun received a forehead slap from Yoo Jae-suk and Yang Se-chan as a penalty.	
681	November 26, 2023	Singapore Exclusive Package (싱가포르 독박패키지)	Hong Jin-ho; Shin Ye-eun	Human Cultural Heritage Team (Yoo Jae-suk, Ji Suk-jin) Olympiad Mathematics Team (Haha, Song Ji-hyo) Professional Boxer & Manager Team (Kim Jong-kook, Hong Jin-ho) Transfer to Love Team (Yang Se-chan, Shin Ye-eun)	Have the most money to win the race and avoid penalty.	The mission was won by the Olympiad Mathematics Team. Haha and Song Ji-hyo receive the teapot set. The Transfer to Love Team, who has the least money, had to dance with 5 people as a penalty.	
682	December 3, 2023	Tazza: Veteran's Wonderland (타짜: 꾼의 낙원)	V (BTS); Yoo Seung-ho	No Teams	Have the most caramels to win the prize.	The mission was won by V. The winner receive the Golden Caramel Plaque.	
683 (Note: Special appearances by Jung Ho-cheol, Kim Seung-jin, Lee Hye-ji, Lee Jung-soo, Park Kyung-ho, Yang Bae-cha and Yang Seung-won.) (Note: The rental system was mentioned in this episode, which will be used for the first time later on in episode 706.)	December 10, 2023	Tazza: Veteran's Wonderland (타짜: 꾼의 낙원)	V (BTS); Yoo Seung-ho	No Teams	Have the most caramels to win the prize.	The mission was won by V. The winner receive the Golden Caramel Plaque.	
683	December 10, 2023	Travel to Suk-jin in Advance (미리 하는 석진의 환갑 여행)	No Guests	No Teams	Choose between the 2 gourds that has a bracelet to win the prize.	There are no winners. Ji Suk-jin received the flour penalty for failing to guess between the 2 gourds and was picked as the member whose trip will be next.	
684	December 17, 2023	Attack and Defense Come, Attack and Defense Stay: Clear War (공수래 공수거：비우기 전쟁)	Joo Hyun-young; Kwon Eun-bi; Tsuki (Billlie)	Hyun-young Team (Joo Hyun-young, Yoo Jae-suk, Ji Suk-jin) Tsuki Team (Tsuki, Haha, Song Ji-hyo) Eun-bi Team (Kwon Eun-bi, Kim Jong-kook, Yang Se-chan)	Have the least R Coins to receive the prize but without being the Top 4 with the most R Coins to avoid penalty.	The mission was won by Hyun-young Team. Yoo Jae-suk, Ji Suk-jin and Joo Hyun-young will each receive fruits gift sets. Kim Jong-kook, Yang Se-chan, Kwon Eun-bi and Tsuki, who are the Top 4 with the most R Coins, has to put stickers in the R coins after the filming as a penalty.	
685 (Note: Ji Suk-jin did not attend the filming due to his health checkup.) (Note: Christmas Special)	December 24, 2023	Will I Give You a Gift at Christmas? (크리스마스에 선물이 올까요?)	Beomgyu; Huening Kai; Soobin; Taehyun; Yeonjun (Tomorrow X Together); Kim Dong-hyun	Jae-suk Team (Yoo Jae-suk, Song Ji-hyo, Yang Se-chan, Beomgyu, Yeonjun, Kim Dong-hyun) Jong-kook Team (Kim Jong-kook, Haha, Huening Kai, Soobin, Taehyun)	Collect as many christmas boxes and have to win in the roulette game to win a christmas present and avoid the penalty.	The mission was won by Kim Jong-kook, Song Ji-hyo, Beomgyu and Huening Kai. Kim Jong-kook receive the golden key, Song Ji-hyo receive the beef steak set, Beomgyu receive the Christmas lease and Huening Kai receive the macaron set. Yoo Jae-suk, Haha, Yang Se-chan, Soobin, Taehyun, Yeonjun and Kim Dong-hyun who weren't drawn by the roulette received the water cannon penalty.	
Special	December 31, 2023	2023 Running Man Guest Awards (2023년 런닝맨 게스트 어워즈)	No guests	No Teams	Special episode of the show with flashbacks of the best moments of some guests who appeared in 2023.	Power Category; Intimidating Spirit Award: Choo Sung-hoon; Variety Overpower Award: Kim Dong-hyun; Triumph Over Jong-kook Award: Yun Sung-bin; Best Hustler Category; The Hustler Among Hustlers Award: Cha Tae-hyun; Clumsy Hustler Award: Yoo Yeon-seok; Growing Hustler Award: Yoo Seung-ho; Luck Category; Luck in Romance Award: DEX; Luck in Wealth Award: V (BTS); Spirit Category; Wanted As New Member Award: Shin Ye-eun	

== Viewership ==
Running Man : South Korea viewers per episode (thousands)

2023	Episode number												
2023	1	2	3	4	5	6	7	8	9	10	11	12	13
635–647	1378	1322	1083	771	1080	971	1018	932	951	1038	979	1046	996
648–660	888	930	1096	1021	798	711	859	908	797	716	699	684	833
661–673	868	865	1119	1057	844	994	899	837	803	759	829	964	704
674–Special	800	916	1123	978	1001	965	792	942	855	863	TBD	TBD	TBD

Source: Audience measurement performed nationwide by Nielsen Media Research.

Average TV viewership ratings
Ep.	Original broadcast date	Nielsen Korea		TNmS
Ep.	Original broadcast date	Nationwide	Seoul	Nationwide
635	January 1, 2023	5.9% (7th)	6.6% (4th)	5.5% (10th)
636	January 8, 2022	5.8% (7th)	6.6% (6th)	5.2% (12th)
637	January 15, 2023	5.2% (10th)	5.9% (8th)	5.0% (13th)
638	January 22, 2023	3.7% (15th)	4.1% (14th)	4.4% (15th)
639	January 29, 2023	4.6% (12th)	5.0% (11th)	4.8% (12th)
640	February 5, 2023	4.2% (14th)	4.8% (9th)	4.2% (13th)
641	February 12, 2023	4.7% (12th)	5.1% (10th)	4.9% (13th)
642	February 19, 2023	4.2% (13th)	4.7% (12th)	4.2% (14th)
643	February 26, 2023	4.2% (12th)	4.8% (8th)	4.3% (12th)
644	March 5, 2023	4.7% (10th)	5.4% (6th)	4.1% (16th)
645	March 12, 2023	4.3% (12th)	4.8% (8th)	4.1% (14th)
646	March 19, 2023	4.7% (10th)	5.2% (7th)	4.5% (12th)
647	March 26, 2023	4.3% (13th)	4.9% (8th)	3.9% (13th)
648	April 2, 2023	4.1% (10th)	4.6% (10th)	3.1% (16th)
649	April 9, 2023	4.2% (10th)	4.9% (6th)	4.3% (14th)
650	April 16, 2023	4.9% (11th)	5.7% (5th)	4.3% (13th)
651	April 23, 2023	4.5% (10th)	5.0% (7th)	4.6% (10th)
652	April 30, 2023	3.6% (12th)	4.1% (9th)	3.5% (16th)
653	May 7, 2023	3.2% (16th)	3.6% (11th)	3.7% (14th)
654	May 14, 2023	3.6% (12th)	3.9% (9th)	3.1% (19th)
655	May 21, 2023	3.7% (13th)	4.3% (8th)	3.5% (16th)
656	May 28, 2023	3.7% (15th)	4.1% (12th)	3.6% (17th)
657	June 4, 2023	3.4% (14th)	3.8% (12th)	4.2% (12th)
658	June 11, 2023	3.1% (18th)	3.2% (18th)	3.2% (16th)
659	June 18, 2023	2.8% (18th)	3.3% (13th)	N/A
660	June 25, 2023	3.5% (15th)	4.0% (10th)	3.7% (17th)
661	July 2, 2023	3.6% (14th)	4.0% (9th)	3.8% (12th)
662	July 9, 2023	3.6% (15th)	4.0% (11th)	3.6% (13th)
663	July 16, 2023	5.1% (12th)	5.6% (8th)	5.3% (11th)
664	July 23, 2023	4.1% (14th)	4.5% (11th)	4.6% (12th)
665	July 30, 2023	3.5% (15th)	3.8% (12th)	3.4% (15th)
666	August 6, 2023	4.6% (10th)	5.1% (9th)	N/A
667	August 13, 2023	3.7% (12th)	4.1% (9th)	3.5% (15th)
668	August 20, 2023	3.9% (12th)	4.2% (11th)	3.5% (15th)
669	August 27, 2023	3.4% (16th)	3.9% (11th)	3.6% (15th)
670	September 3, 2023	3.5% (14th)	4.1% (11th)	3.4% (18th)
671	September 10, 2023	4.0% (11th)	4.6% (7th)	3.2% (18th)
672	September 17, 2023	4.3% (11th)	4.6% (7th)	3.2% (18th)
673	September 24, 2023	3.0% (13th)	3.3% (12th)	2.9% (17th)
674	October 8, 2023	3.5% (14th)	3.8% (11th)	4.1% (13th)
675	October 15, 2023	3.8% (13th)	4.4% (8th)	3.5% (15th)
676	October 22, 2023	4.4% (11th)	5.2% (6th)	3.7% (15th)
677	October 29, 2023	4.2% (10th)	4.5% (8th)	4.6% (9th)
678	November 5, 2023	4.3% (12th)	4.7% (10th)	3.9% (14th)
679	November 12, 2023	4.2% (12th)	4.6% (13th)	3.8% (14th)
680	November 19, 2023	3.5% (13th)	4.1% (9th)	3.5% (17th)
681	November 26, 2023	4.2% (13th)	4.5% (11th)	3.6% (15th)
682	December 3, 2023	3.6% (14th)	4.1% (13th)	4.1% (14th)
683	December 10, 2023	3.9% (13th)	4.5% (10th)	3.3% (18th)
684	December 17, 2023	3.6% (17th)	N/A	N/A
685	December 24, 2023	3.1% (23rd)	N/A	N/A
Special	December 31, 2023	N/A	N/A	N/A
N/A denotes episode didn't enter top 20 in Nielsen Korea and TNmS ratings.
