= Naugaon railway station =

Railway station in Madhya Pradesh

Naugaon

General information
- Location: Shitla Mata Mandir Road, Naugaon, Gwalior district, Madhya Pradesh; India
- Coordinates: 26°07′50″N 78°07′13″E
- System: Passenger train station
- Owner: Indian Railways
- Operator: West Central Railway
- Line: Indore–Gwalior line
- Platforms: 1
- Tracks: 1

Construction
- Structure type: Standard (on ground station)

Other information
- Status: Active
- Station code: NGON
- Zone(s): West Central Railway zone
- Division(s): Bhopal

History
- Opened: 1899
- Former names: Gwalior Light Railway

Services
Preceding station	Indian Railways	Following station
Gwalior Junction towards ?	West Central Railway zone Indore–Gwalior line	Panihar towards ?
Location

Naugaon railway station is a railway station on Indore–Gwalior line under the Bhopal railway division of West Central Railway zone. This is situated beside Shitla Mata Mandir Road at Naugaon in Gwalior district of the Indian state of Madhya Pradesh.
