= Moj =

Indian video-sharing service

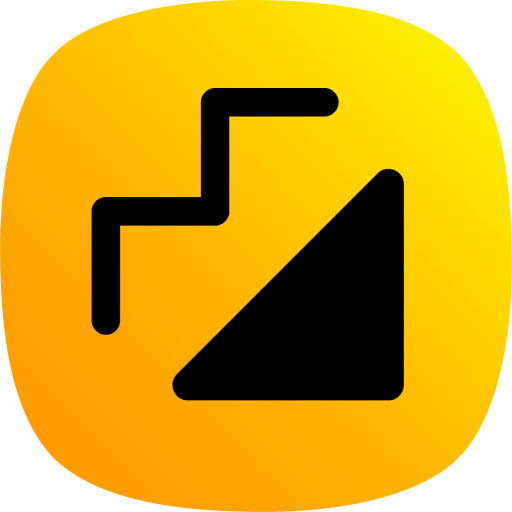

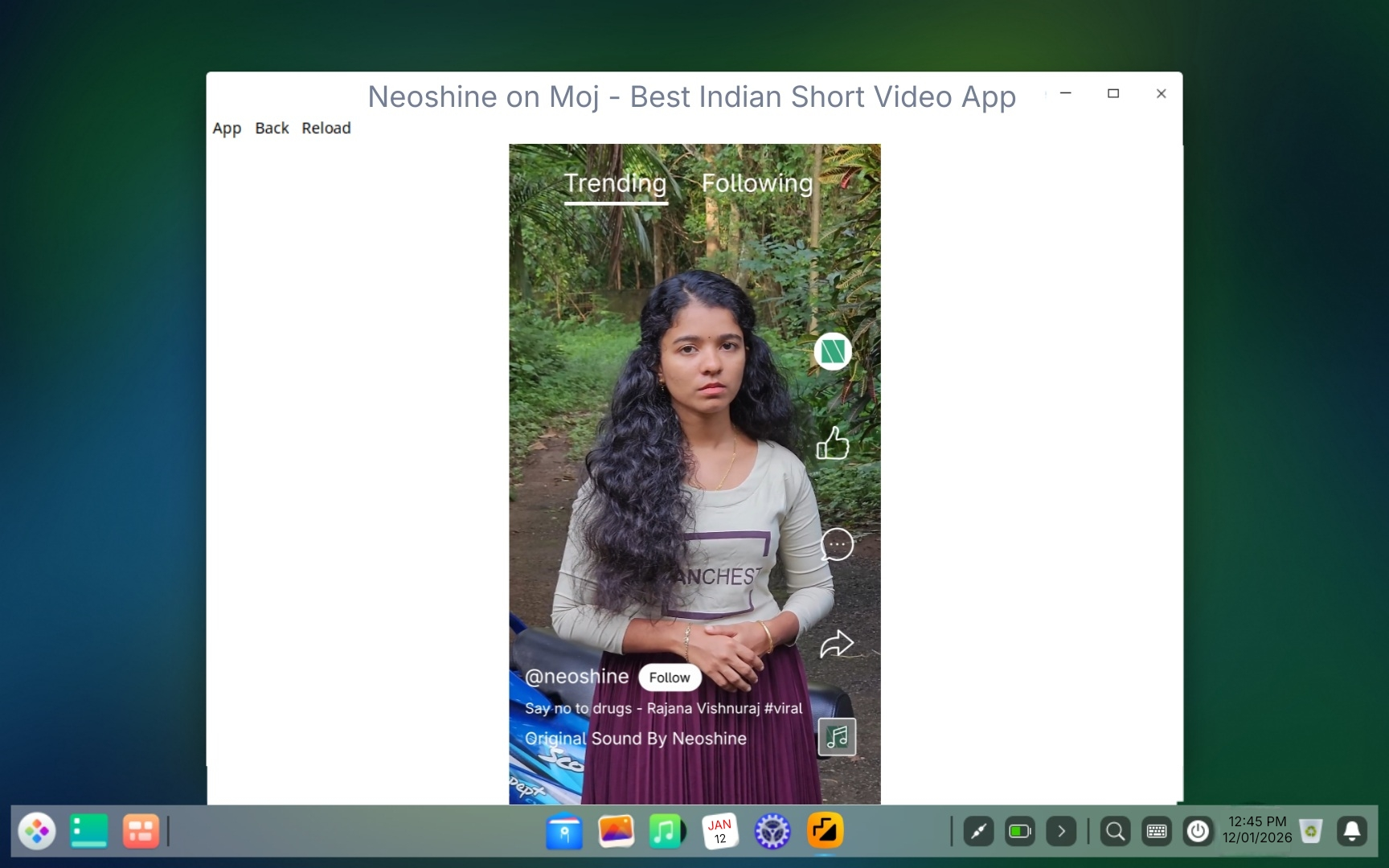
- Screenshot Moj app is playing a short video on Arch Linux
- Developer: Mohalla Tech
- Initial release: 29 June 2020; 5 years ago
- Operating system: iOS; Android
- Size: 263.8 MB (iOS); 104 MB (Android)
- Available in: 12 languages
- List of languages: Hindi; Bengali; Bhojpuri; Gujarati; Kannada; Malayalam; Marathi; Odia; Punjabi; Tamil; Telugu; English
- Type: Social Media; Video sharing
- Licence: Freeware
- Website: mojapp.in

Moj is an Indian short-form video-sharing social networking service owned by Mohalla Tech Pvt Ltd, the parent company of ShareChat. Launched on 29 June 2020, shortly after the Government of India banned TikTok and several other Chinese apps, Moj quickly gained popularity as one of the leading domestic alternatives for short-form video content in India.

== History ==
Moj was introduced by Mohalla Tech, the Bengaluru-based parent company of ShareChat, within days of the TikTok ban in India in June 2020. The app targeted the growing demand for short-form video platforms in the country.

By early 2021, Moj had amassed over 100 million downloads on the Google Play Store. In February 2021, Mohalla Tech raised significant funding from investors like Tiger Global, Snapchat, and others, which supported both Moj and ShareChat’s growth.

In 2022, Moj partnered with several music labels to expand its licensed music library, competing directly with global platforms such as Instagram Reels and YouTube Shorts.

== Features ==
- Short Videos: Users can create and watch videos up to 15–60 seconds.
- Filters & Effects: The platform provides AR filters, editing tools, stickers, and music integration.
- Regional Language Support: Moj supports more than 15 Indian languages including Hindi, Bengali, Tamil, Telugu, Kannada, and Marathi.
- Music Integration: Users can add music tracks to their videos from licensed Indian and international music libraries.
- Creator Program: Moj launched initiatives to support influencers and creators, offering training, monetization, and promotional opportunities.

== Popularity ==
- By mid-2021, Moj reported over 160 million monthly active users.
- According to reports, Moj consistently ranked among the top social media apps in India in terms of downloads.
- The app gained traction in Tier-2 and Tier-3 cities due to its multilingual support and focus on local content.

== Competitors ==
Moj competes with several other short video platforms in India, including:

- Instagram Reels (Meta)
- YouTube Shorts (Google)
- Josh (Dailyhunt/VerSe Innovation)
- Roposo (InMobi)
- MX TakaTak (later merged with Moj in 2022)
- RedPost (an emerging Indian social networking platform)

== Merger with MX TakaTak ==
In February 2022, Mohalla Tech announced that Moj would merge with MX TakaTak, another leading short video app owned by Times Internet. The merger created one of the largest short-video ecosystems in India, with a combined user base of over 300 million monthly active users.

== See also ==
- ShareChat
- Josh (app)
- Instagram Reels
- YouTube Shorts
