= MOJ (motorcycle) =

Defunct Polish motorcycle brand

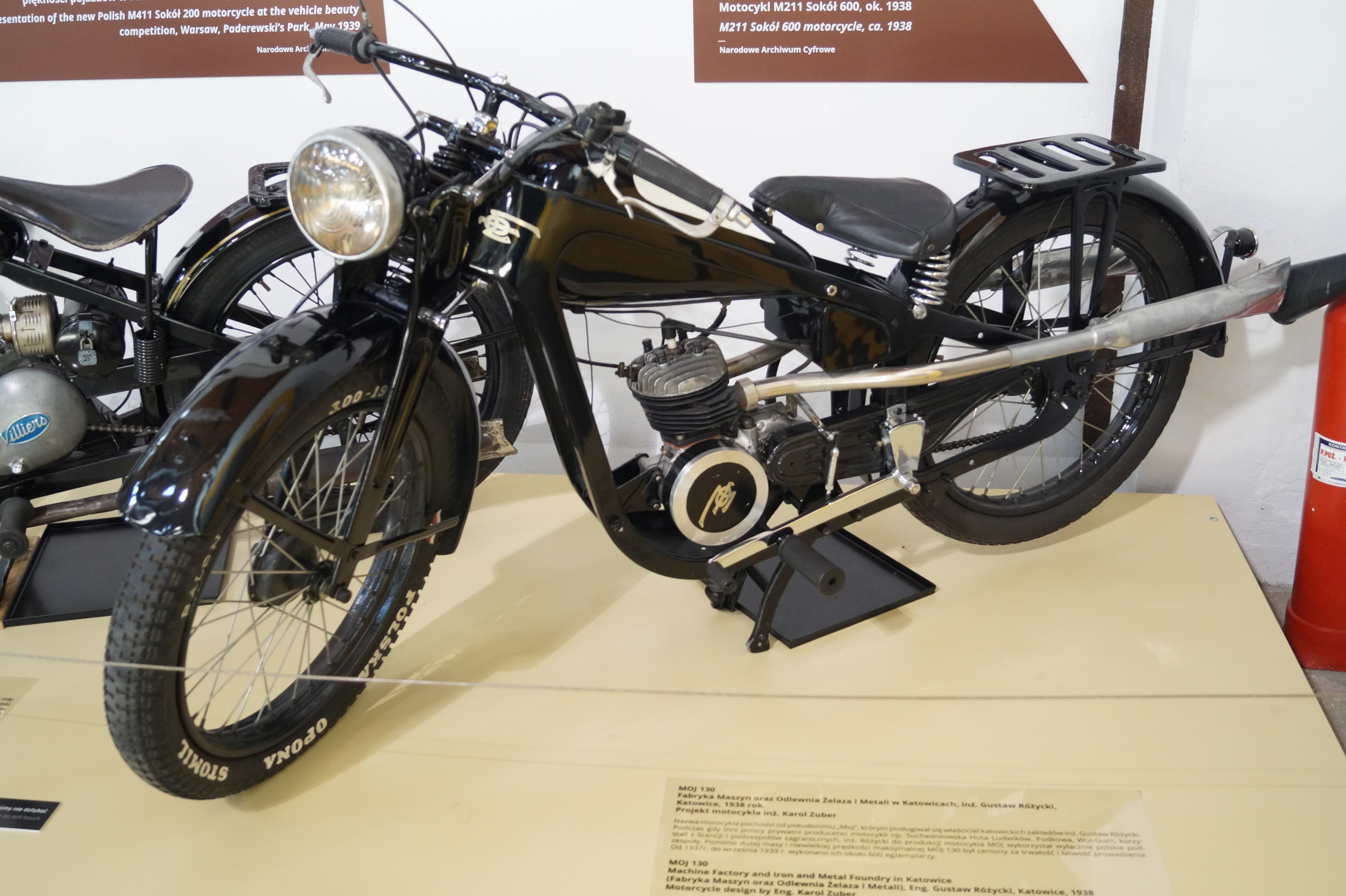
- MOJ 130 displayed in the National Museum, Kraków
- Industry: Motorcycle manufacturer
- Founded: 1935 in Katowice, Poland
- Founder: Gustaw Różycki
- Defunct: September 1939
- Fate: Commandeered for war production
- Key people: Karol Zuber
- Products: MOJ 130
- Number of employees: 800 (1939)
- Parent: Fabryka Maszyn Oraz Odlewnia Żelaza i Metali MOJ

MOJ (Note: Sometimes incorrectly translated as MOY) is a defunct brand of motorcycles that were manufactured in Katowice, Poland from 1937 to 1939. The name derives from the nickname of the founder, Gustaw Różycki, whilst he was a student at the University of Leoben.

== History ==
In 1933, mining engineer Gustaw Różycki bought a small mining machinery factory in Załęże, Katowice from Alfred Wagner and renamed it Fabryka Maszyn Oraz Odlewnia Żelaza i Metali MOJ. He set about expanding the company and by the time WWII broke out the number of employees had risen from 15 to 800. The company produced mining equipment, boat engines, chain saws and other machinery.

Różycki was a motorcycle enthusiast and wanted to produce his own machines. In 1935 he employed engineer Karol Zuber to head a new motorcycle division. The first motorcycle, the MOJ 130, was produced later that year. It had a 128 cc two-stroke engine. A 250 cc machine was in development, and there were plans to produce cars. Land had been brought in Sandomierz to build a second factory for car production. Car production was due to start in 1940/1 but the war brought an end to this plan. A rotary engine was in development and Różycki was granted a patent for the design.

Following the German invasion of Poland, the factory was commandeered by the Germans to produce mining equipment and ammunition, although a small number of motorcycles were manufactured for military use. Różycki joined the resistance and as a result spent the rest of the war in concentration camps in Dachau and Gusen.

After the end of WWII, the factory was nationalised and it was decided not to re-establish motorcycle production.

== Models ==
=== MOJ 130 ===
The motorcycle was modelled on German motorcycles of the time, with an emphasis on quality. Prototype models were fitted with a Villiers engine, but production models used their own 128 cc single cylinder two-stroke engine. A rigid duplex frame was used with pressed steel girder forks. Most components were made by the factory or were from Polish manufacturers. The motorcycle was presented to the press in February 1937 and production machines were available in August of that year.

In 1938 the engine was improved with dual exhausts exiting the cylinder at the rear and the carburettor moved to the side of the engine. The gearchange was changed from hand to foot operated. Some machines were purchased by the military, including the 10th Motorized Cavalry Brigade. There was also a state-funded purchase scheme for officers to buy the motorcycle.

A few competition versions of the model were made and on which Różycki entered various events, including the 1939 Tatra Rally, which he won.

Around 600 units of the MOJ 130 were produced pre-war.

== Notes and references ==
=== Bibliography ===
- Jońca, Adam (2013). Motocykle Wojska Polskiego [Motorcycles of the Polish Army] (in Polish). Warszawa: Edipresse Polska. ISBN 978-83-7769-570-8.
- Jońca, Adam; Szubański, Rajmund; Tarczyński, Jan (1990). Wrzesień 1939: pojazdy Wojska Polskiego; barwa i broń [September 1939: vehicles of the Polish Army; color and weapons] (in Polish). Wydawnictwa Komunikacji i Łączności. ISBN 978-83-206-0847-2.
- Szczerbicki, Tomasz (2010). "Niecodzienna fotografia" [Unusual photography]. Militaria XX Wieku (in Polish). 5 (38).
