= Ghatigaon =

Ghatigaon Ghātīgaon
- Village
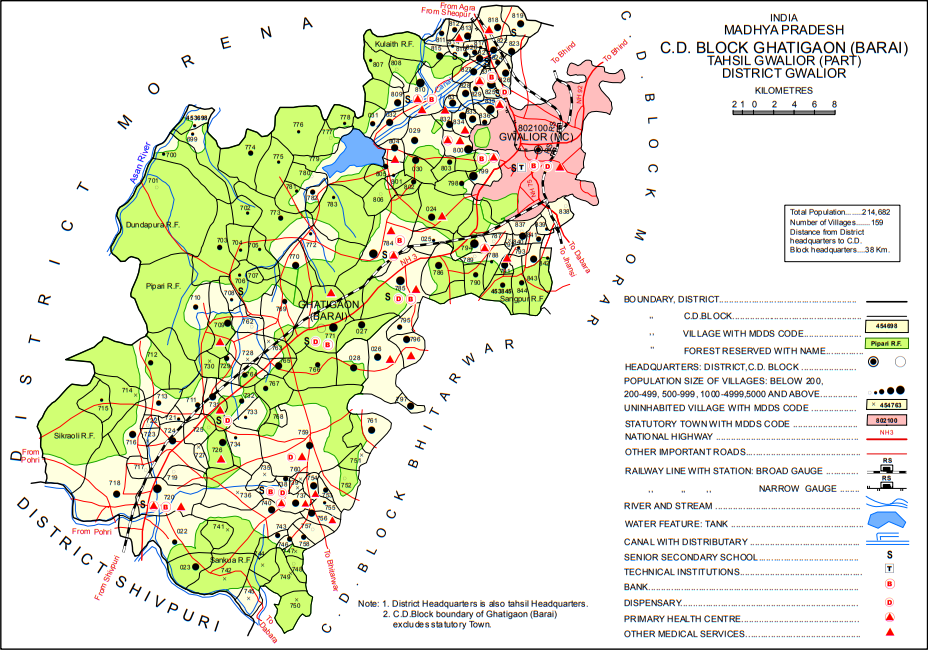
- Map of Ghatigaon CD block

- Location in Madhya Pradesh, India Ghatigaon (India)
- Coordinates: 26.053327°N 77.936016°E
- Country: India
- State: Madhya Pradesh
- District: Gwalior

Area
  - Total: 18.601 km^{2} (7.182 sq mi)

Population (2011)
  - Total: 5,641
  - Density: 303.3/km^{2} (785.4/sq mi)

Languages
  - Official: Hindi
- Time zone: UTC+5:30 (IST)

Ghatigaon (Gháṭígaon) is a village and corresponding community development block in Gwalior district of Madhya Pradesh, India. As of 2011, the village population was 5,641, in 1,088 households.

== History ==
Ghatigaon is mentioned in the 1908 British gazetteer as a village of Gwalior State, in pargana Mastura of zila Gird Gwalior, with an area of 10,703 bighas and a population of 679. It had a camping ground, a Dak bungalow, an excise shop, metalled road access, a state post office, a railway station, and a sayar naka.

== Villages ==
Ghatigaon CD block has the following 159 villages:

Village name	Total land area (hectares)	Population (in 2011)
Baraj-Kalan	919.9	352
Samedi	1,744.6	355
Khitera	1,396.6	327
Basota	4,350.4	149
Surhela	779.1	381
Charaidang	980.4	652
Tilawali	852.2	225
Para	897.5	331
Antri	1,000.4	338
Ghatwasini	79.6	111
Jakhodi	503.4	388
Jakhoda	7,919	4,202
Amargarh	2,529.8	747
Charairehanta	1,211.7	851
Bagwalagaon	3,340.7	700
Dabka	673.6	595
Charaisikrawali	4,345.8	0
Sikrawali	1,248.1	458
Sahasari	1,699.1	2,045
Mahua Kheda	330.3	46
Badagaonjagir	2,547.5	3,298
Baraipura	617.1	104
Mohana	4,157.7	18,542
Renhati (Rehati81)	209.4	220
Pehasari (Pehsari)	289.4	168
Dangkandhar	658.2	0
Dorar	1,520.5	3,370
Jivajipur	154.2	101
Shyampur	317.6	1,009
Seedhni	260.2	0
Keroli	146.8	0
Ghegholi	965.5	776
Dain	311.9	0
Renhat	1,191.7	2,104
Charaipilkhana	954.6	537
Siyawari	805.3	270
Kemari	1,235.8	267
Bhakarra	401.4	0
Manpur	1,905	0
Patai	1,001.8	2,972
Domtorkhalsa	104	700
Domtormafi	106.3	0
Karahi (Karai)	185.5	1,923
Obra	1,011	0
Sankua	2,490.4	0
Banheri	769	974
Banhera	185.5	0
Durgasi	813.8	0
Sekra	365.4	557
Sekri	294.7	0
Chui (1981=Chuhi)	237.6	0
Patpari	920.8	0
Poonchhari	1,077.4	0
Dharamgarh	759.8	0
Kalawah	1,256.7	164
Dangora	173	532
Samrai	279.5	1,428
Changora	452.2	392
Badkagaon	343.5	1,067
Tadhai	524.6	1
Barahana	405.4	773
Aron	6,621.5	4,268
Pahi Aron	164.6	0
Chait	1,261.8	2,054
Berkheda	524.6	162
Chhapra	91.6	0
Kiat	785.4	903
Sirsa	1,082.6	1,315
Dursedi	1,304.6	861
Maharampura	928.8	534
Shambhupur	313.4	0
Khudawali	504.6	859
Dhuwan	2,057.3	1,042
Ghatigaon (Barai)	1,860.1	5,641
Dundapura	3,835.9	329
Jadidrai	3,154.5	935
Chhikari	2,546.1	631
Lakhanpura	1,898.7	408
Gurja	1,284.3	300
Raikasba	3,179.1	4
Prayagpura	421	343
Nagdha	478.6	24
Bhoreshwar	415.5	37
Mircha	819.6	217
Pawa Madaiya	685.8	855
Pawata	2,594.7	253
Barai	5,303.4	8,302
Panihar	2,513.7	7,119
Nayagaon	1,994.4	2,699
Chandoha Khurd	246.2	10
Bela	582.5	494
Kheriya Mritya	100.4	57
Chhonda	388.9	988
Naugaon	942.4	1,909
Nonera	150.2	0
Kheriya Kachhai	220.8	419
Ajaypur	647.4	8,328
Rampur	533.2	649
Par	1,112.6	2,847
Hukamgarh	387.9	2,012
Chak Girvai No. 1	110.3	517
Girvai	1,168.9	9,770
Virpur	97	6,140
Bithauli	94	403
Rampura	171	921
Maharajpura	92	703
Tighra	778.5	1,390
Sujwaya	992.4	527
Malipura	150	12
Maheshwara	90.9	432
Agrabhatpura	910.4	80
Mehadpur	285.7	1,127
Kuleth	1,997.1	5,383
Tilghana	512.2	553
Mangupura	154.3	630
Nirawali	331.1	1,744
Nayakpura	165.2	388
Dugnawali	1,242.6	1,583
Bilpura	163.8	926
Gajipura	87.8	337
Baraua Nurabad	852.3	3,371
Susera	916.6	2,987
Jinawali	193	738
Milawali	246	1,113
Rairu	723.1	1,732
Roodhpura	246.5	1,738
Gangapur	223	844
Puranichavni	479.1	10,219
Malnpur	393.1	1,503
Jigsoli	562.4	1,779
Sigora	409	2,224
Tehlri	197.9	768
Kheriya Bhat	140.1	465
Kheriya Kuleth	212.5	1,383
Bhaypura	253	1,207
Jebra	617.8	1,003
Odpura	794.4	2,147
Shankrpur	545.3	6,705
Thar	67.8	678
Kalyanpur	2.3	3
Kotaviran	15.1	10
Barauapichhore	294.3	417
Salupura	322.7	1,100
Piproli	289	997
Tiletha	479.5	333
Purasani	1098.7	1,099
Kushrajpur	810.7	527
Santau	1,256.5	698
Ummedgarh	2,849	601
Dadori	1,819	1,273
Raipur	3,215.3	3,257
Bhagwan Ka Pura	3,215	423
Simiriya Tanka	6,489.1	3,827
Jakha	0	1,328
Imliya	0	2,772
Sojna	1,645.2	2,002
Parpate Ka Pura	0	1,371
Kaitha	2,202.8	990
Talpura	0	2,134
