= Onnuri Gift Certificate =

South Korean vouchers

Onnuri Gift Certificates (Korean: 온누리상품권) are vouchers issued by the South Korean government that are intended to benefit small–medium businesses of the domestic economy. To accomplish this, their use is subject to a number of restrictions that have varied over time. As of 2025, they are only redeemable at South Korean companies with annual sales of ₩3 billion (around US$2 million) or less. They are available in physical and digital form.

The program was founded in July 2009 via the Uplifting Traditional Markets and Stores Special Law (전통시장 및 상점가 육성을 위한 특별법).

The gift certificates have been used in a variety of ways. The Korea Institute for Advancement of Technology, under an agreement with the employee union, paid out part of employee bonuses using the certificates in 2020. In 2026, amidst an AI-related business windfall, Samsung Electronics offered Onnuri Gift Certificates amounting to 20% of a purchase to anyone who purchased a Samsung product in a limited time.
