= Mohana railway station =

Railway station in Madhya Pradesh, India

Mohana

General information
- Location: Keketo Dam Road, Badagaonjagir, Gwalior district, Madhya Pradesh; India
- Coordinates: 25°53′49″N 77°45′46″E
- Elevation: 317 m (1,040 ft)
- System: Passenger train station
- Owner: Indian Railways
- Operator: West Central Railway
- Line: Indore–Gwalior line
- Platforms: 1
- Tracks: 1

Construction
- Structure type: Standard (on ground station)

Other information
- Status: Active
- Station code: MOJ
- Zone(s): West Central Railway zone
- Division(s): Bhopal

History
- Opened: 1899
- Former names: Gwalior Light Railway

Services
Preceding station	Indian Railways	Following station
Renhat towards ?	West Central Railway zone Indore–Gwalior line	Indargarh towards ?
Location

Mohana railway station is a railway station on Indore–Gwalior line under the Bhopal railway division of West Central Railway zone. This is situated beside Keketo Dam Road at Badagaonjagir in Gwalior district of the Indian state of Madhya Pradesh.
