= Korea Institute for Advancement of Technology =

Korea Institute for Advancement of Technology (KIAT) (Hangul: 한국산업기술진흥원)
- Company type: Public Institute
- Founded: 2009
- Headquarters: Seoul, Republic of Korea
- Revenue: US$1.17bn (2012)
- Number of employees: 257 (2012)
- Parent: Ministry of Trade
- Website: www.kiat.or.kr

The Korea Institute for Advancement of Technology (KIAT) is a quasi government-public institute under the Korean Ministry of Trade, Industry and Energy. Formed in May 2009, the main functions of KIAT include analyzing and formulating Korean R&D and industrial policy, acting as an industrial technology innovation funding agency, creating Korea's industrial and technological ecosystem, and fostering international technological cooperation. KIAT has an annual budget of circa one billion dollars, and employs 257 staff. (2012)

== History ==
KIAT was formed in May 2009 by the merger and consolidation of six previous Korean government and public institutes: ITEP (Korea Institute of Industrial Technology Evaluation and Planning), KOTEF (Korea Industrial Technology Foundation), KTTC (Korea Technology Transfer Center), IITA (Institution for Information Technology Advancement), KMAC (Korea Materials and Components Industry Agency), and KIDP (Korea Institute of Design Promotion).

== KIAT Presidents ==
Date	President
May, 2009–September, 2013	Kim Yong Geun (김용근)
September, 2013–2018	Chung Jae Hoon (정재훈)
September, 2018	Han Chang Min (한창민)
September, 2018–2019	Kim Hak Do (김학도) Interim
September, 2019–2022	Seok Yeon Cheol (석연철)
September, 2022–present	Min Byung Ju (Ms) (민병주)

== Project Funding and grants ==
In 2012, KIAT distributed circa US$940m in technology project grants and R&D funding.

== Events ==
KIAT is responsible for organizing numerous annual technology, R&D, and collaboration events. These include the tech+ forum and Eureka day events.

=== tech+ forum ===
The Tech Plus Forum ('tech+ forum') has been held since 2009 in Korea. It is a 'knowledge concert' that gathers leading experts in innovation and inspiration to discuss themed-topics over the course of a two-day event. The name Tech+ is derived from technology, economy, culture and humanity. In 2012, tech+ was held under the theme of ‘dream@technology'.

=== Eureka Day ===
EUREKA is a pan-European collaborative R&D network that was established in 1985. It currently has 41 full member countries and Korea is an associate member. KIAT acts as the EUREKA NCP (National Contact Point) for Korea, and since 2011 has held an annual Eureka day event to advance Korea-European cooperation and innovation via matchmaking and seminars.

== Notes ==
Reference #4. Figures derived and calculated from Korean government official statistics, Knowledge Economy Committee, Korean National Assembly, accessed Jan 09, 2013.
