= Umaria railway station =

Railway station in Madhya Pradesh, India

Umaria

General information
- Location: Umaria, Umaria district, MP; India
- Coordinates: 23°31′23″N 80°49′21″E
- Elevation: 468 metres (1,535 ft)
- System: Express train and Passenger train station
- Owner: Indian Railways
- Line: Allahabad–Jabalpur section
- Platforms: 3
- Tracks: 3

Construction
- Structure type: Standard (on ground)
- Parking: Yes

Other information
- Status: Functioning
- Station code: UMR
- Zone(s): South East Central Railway
- Division(s): Bilaspur
Location
- Location within India Location within Madhya Pradesh

Umaria railway station is a railway station in Umaria city of Umaria district in Madhya Pradesh. The station was built in 1886. The Tropic of Cancer passes at about 14.65 km to east. The station code of Umaria is 'UMR'. It has three platforms. It comes under Bilaspur railway division of South East Central Railway zone.

== Trains ==
- Amarkantak Express
- Bilaspur–Rewa Express
- Betwa Express
- Durg–Nautanwa Express (via Sultanpur)
- Durg–Nautanwa Express (via Varanasi)
- Bhopal–Bilaspur Express
- Sarnath Express
- Kalinga Utkal Express
- Durg–Jammu Tawi Superfast Express
- Chhattisgarh Sampark Kranti Superfast Express
- Narmada Express
- Durg–Ajmer Express
- Durg–Firozpur Cantonment Antyodaya Express
- Durg–Hazrat Nizamuddin Humsafar Express
- Madan Mahal–Ambikapur Intercity Express
- Bhopal–Chirimiri Express
- Hirakud Express
