= Shahdol railway station =

Railway station in Madhya Pradesh, India

Shahdol

General information
- Location: Shahdol, Shahdol district, MP; India
- Coordinates: 23°17′10″N 81°21′55″E
- Elevation: 467 metres (1,532 ft)
- System: Express train and Passenger train station
- Owner: Indian Railways
- Line: Bilaspur–Katni line
- Platforms: 3
- Tracks: 11

Construction
- Structure type: Standard (on ground)
- Parking: Yes

Other information
- Status: Functioning
- Station code: SDL
- Zone(s): South East Central Railway
- Division(s): Bilaspur
Location
- Location within India Location within Madhya Pradesh

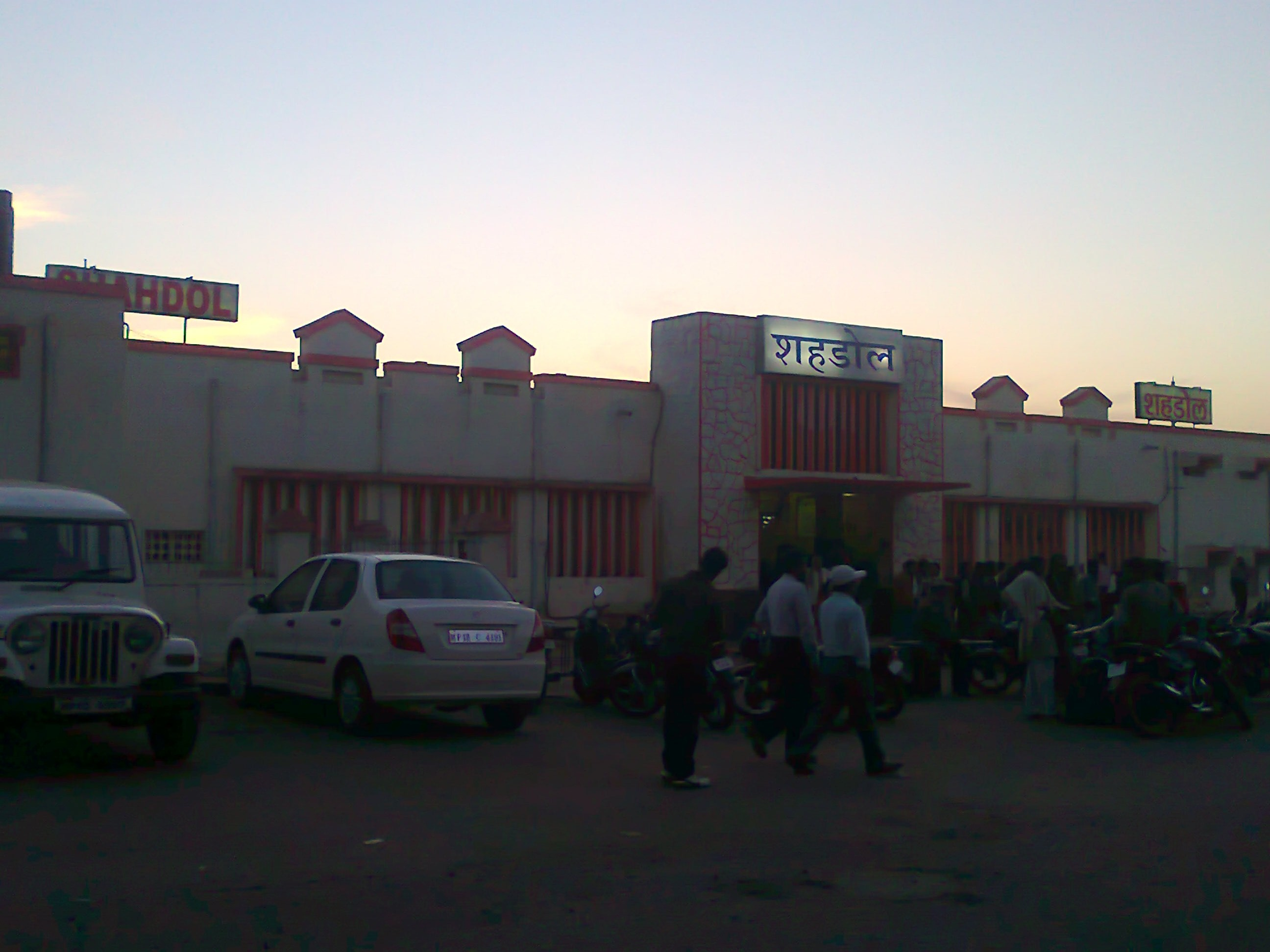
Front view of Shahdol's railway station

Shahdol railway station is a railway station in Shahdol town of Shahdol district in Madhya Pradesh. Station Code of Shahdol is 'SDL'. It has three platforms. It comes under Bilaspur railway division of South East Central Railway Zone. It is on the Allahabad–Jabalpur section.

== Trains Originate and Terminate From Shahdol ==
- Nagpur Shahdol Express
- Ambikapur Shahdol Express
- Bilaspur Shahdol Memu
- Ambikapur Shahdol Memu

== Trains ==
- Durg–Firozpur Cantonment Antyodaya Express
- Durg–Hazrat Nizamuddin Humsafar Express
- Jabalpur–Santragachi Humsafar Express
- Santragachi–Habibganj Humsafar Express
- Sarnath Express
- Bhopal–Bilaspur Express
- Betwa Express
- Durg–Nautanwa Express (via Sultanpur)
- Durg–Nautanwa Express (via Varanasi)
- Hirakud Express
- Amarkantak Express
- Lucknow–Raipur Garib Rath Express
- Durg–Chirimiri Express
- Durg–Ambikapur Express
- Bhopal–Chirimiri Express
- Bilaspur–Rewa Express
- Kalinga Utkal Express
- Durg–Jammu Tawi Superfast Express
- Chhattisgarh Sampark Kranti Superfast Express
- Madan Mahal–Ambikapur Intercity Express
- Shalimar–Udaipur City Weekly Express
- Shalimar–Bhuj Weekly Superfast Express
- Narmada Express
- Durg–Jammu Tawi Express
- Bikaner–Bilaspur Antyodaya Express
- Durg–Ajmer Express
- Visakhapatnam–Bhagat Ki Kothi Express
- Durg–Jaipur Weekly Express
- Valsad–Puri Superfast Express
- Bikaner–Puri Express
