= Amarkantak Express =

Train in India

Amarkantak Superfast Express
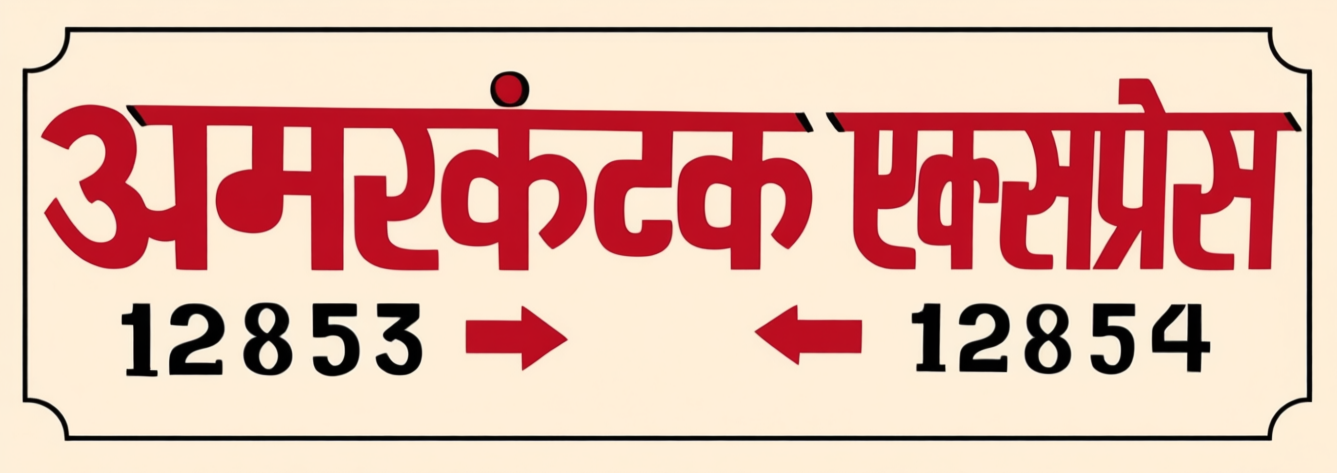

Overview
- Service type: Express
- Locale: Chhattisgarh & Madhya Pradesh
- Current operator: South East Central Railways

Route
- Termini: Durg (DURG); Bhopal (BPL)
- Stops: 29
- Distance travelled: 893 km (555 mi)
- Average journey time: 16 hours 10 minutes
- Service frequency: Daily
- Train number: 12853 / 12854

On-board services
- Classes: First AC, AC 2 tier, AC 3 tier, Sleeper Class, General Unreserved
- Seating arrangements: Yes
- Sleeping arrangements: Yes
- Catering facilities: Available
- Observation facilities: Large windows
- Baggage facilities: Below the seats

Technical
- Rolling stock: LHB coaches
- Track gauge: 1,676 mm (5 ft 6 in)
- Operating speed: 130 km/h (81 mph) maximum, 56 km/h (35 mph) average with halts
Route map
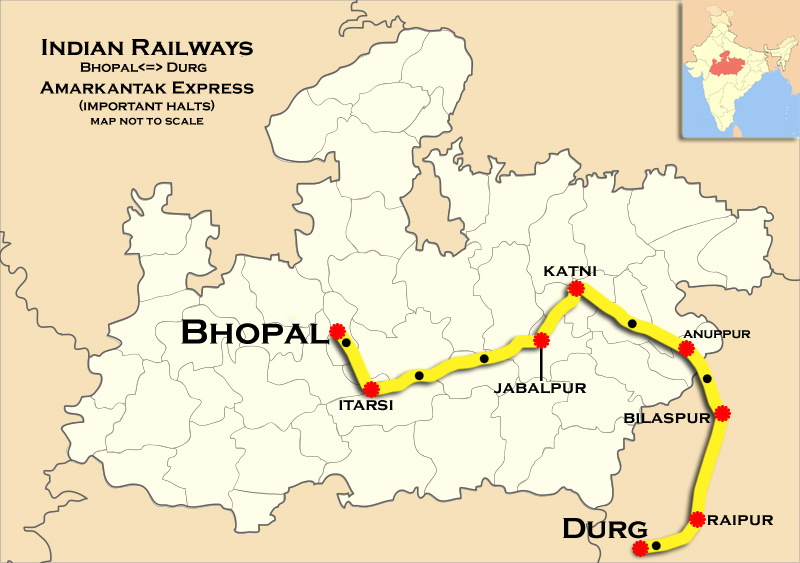

The 12853 / 12854 Amarkantak Express is a daily Superfast Express train which runs between the Bhopal Junction railway station in Bhopal, the capital city of Madhya Pradesh and Durg, a city in Chhattisgarh state in central India. This train replaced the 8225/8226 Bhopal–Bilaspur Mahanadi Express along with the 8291/8292 Bhopal–Raipur Express and the 1235/1236 Bhopal–Jabalpur Express.

== Background ==
The name of the train comes from the name of the city Amarkantak, which is a pilgrim town in the Anuppur District from the state of Madhya Pradesh. The Narmada River, which is the largest river in Central India originates near the city.

== Arrival and departure information ==
Train no. 12854 departs from Bhopal Junction daily at 4.00 pm, reaching Durg the next day at 08.05 am. Train no. 12853 departs daily from Durg at 6.25 pm reaching Bhopal Junction the next day at 10:30 am. This train takes in all 27 halts before reaching its destination

== Route and halts ==
The important stations along the train route are:

- Bhopal Junction
- Rani Kamalapati
- Narmadapuram
- Obeidullaganj
- Itarsi Junction
- Sohagpur
- Pipariya
- Gadarwara
- Narsinghpur
- Madan Mahal
- Jabalpur Junction
- Katni South
- Umaria
- Shahdol
- Anuppur Junction
- Amlai
- Pendra Road
- Bilaspur Junction
- Bhatapara
- Raipur Junction
- Bhilai Power House
- Durg

== Coach composition ==
The train normally consists of 22 LHB coaches:

- 1 AC 1 cum II Tier (HA1)
- 2 AC II Tier (A1 A2)
- 7 AC III Tier (B1-B7)
- 1 AC III Tier economy (M1)
- 6 Sleeper coach (S1-S6)
- 3 General coach
- 1 EOG/Power Car
- 1 Seating cum luggage rake/SLR

As is customary with Indian Railways, coaches are added/removed as per the demand.

== Average speed and frequency ==
This is a daily train service in each direction. The trains operate at an average speed of 54 km/hour.

== Loco links ==
The trains are hauled by the following locomotives;

- Itarsi-based WAP-4 / WAP-7 locomotive between Bhopal Junction and Itarsi Junction.
- Itarsi-based WAP-7 locomotive between Itarsi Junction and Bilaspur Junction.
- Bhilai-based WAP-7 locomotive between Bilaspur Junction and Durg Junction.

== Direction reversal ==
The train reverses its direction twice at;

- Itarsi Junction
- Bilaspur Junction.

== Other trains from Bhopal to Bilaspur ==
- 12441/12442 Bilaspur Rajdhani Express
- 18233/18234 Narmada Express
- 18235/18236 Bhopal–Bilaspur Passenger cum Express
- 18237/18238 Chhattisgarh Express
- 18473/18474 Puri–Jodhpur Express
- 12409/12410 Raigarh–Hazrat Nizamuddin Gondwana Express
- 22909/22910 Valsad–Puri Superfast Express
