= Durg–Jaipur Weekly Express =

Train in India

Overview
- Service type: Express
- First service: 16 February 2014; 12 years ago
- Current operator: South East Central Railway zone

Route
- Termini: Durg Junction (DURG); Jaipur Junction (JP)
- Stops: 18
- Distance travelled: 1,262 km (784 mi)
- Average journey time: 23h 20m
- Service frequency: Weekly (Note: Runs one day in a week for every direction.)
- Train number: 18213/18214

On-board services
- Classes: AC 2 tier, AC 3 tier, Sleeper class, General Unreserved
- Seating arrangements: No
- Sleeping arrangements: Yes
- Catering facilities: On-board catering E-catering
- Observation facilities: ICF coach
- Entertainment facilities: No
- Baggage facilities: No
- Other facilities: Below the seats

Technical
- Rolling stock: 2
- Track gauge: 1,676 mm (5 ft 6 in)
- Operating speed: 54 km/h (34 mph), including halts
Route map
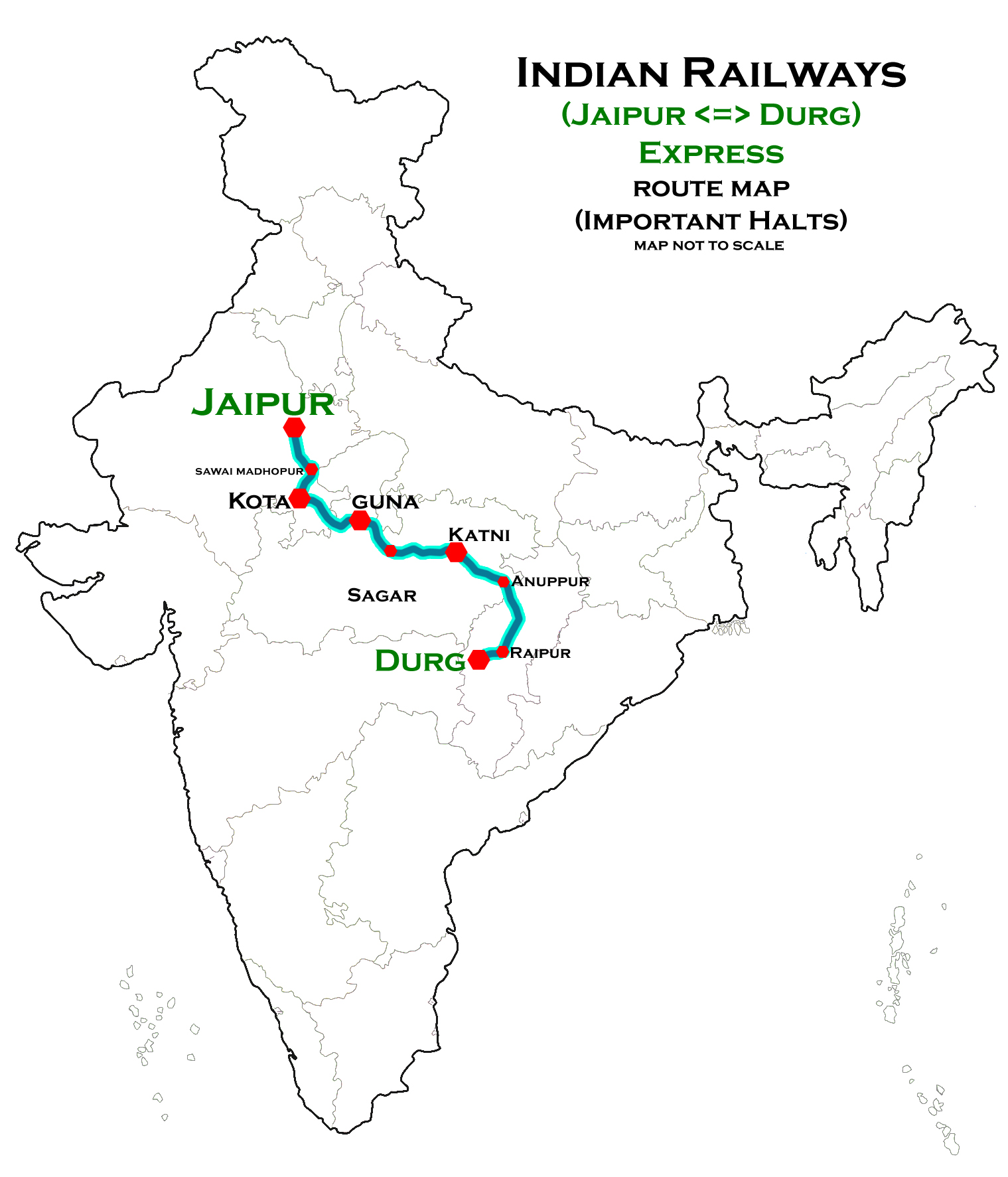

The Durg–Jaipur Weekly Express is an Express train belonging to South East Central Railway zone that runs between Durg Junction and Jaipur Junction in India. It is currently being operated with 18213/18214 train numbers on a weekly basis.

== Service ==
The 18213/Durg–Jaipur Weekly Express has an average speed of 54 km/h and covers 1262 km in 23h 20m. The 18214/Jaipur–Durg Weekly Express has an average speed of 51 km/h and covers 1262 km in 24h 35m.

== Route and halts ==
The important halts of the train are:

- Durg Junction
- Raipur Junction
- Uslapur
- Pendra Road
- Anuppur Junction
- Shahdol
- Umaria
- Katni Murwara
- Saugor
- Ashoknagar
- Guna Junction
- Ruthiyai Junction
- Baran
- Kota Junction
- Sawai Madhopur Junction
- Durgapura
- Jaipur Junction

== Coach composition ==
The train has standard ICF rakes with a maximum speed of 110 kmph. The train consists of 21 coaches:

- 1 First AC
- 2 AC II Tier
- 2 AC III Tier
- 8 Sleeper coaches
- 6 General Unreserved
- 2 Seating cum Luggage Rake

== Traction ==
Both trains are hauled by a Ghaziabad Loco Shed-based WAM-4 electric locomotive from Durg to Sawai Madhopur Junction. From Sawai Madhopur Junction, trains are hauled by a Bhagat Ki Kothi Loco Shed-based WDP-4D diesel locomotive uptil Jaipur.

== Rake sharing ==
The train shares its rake with 18215/18216 Durg–Jammu Tawi Express.

== Direction reversal ==
The train reverses its direction 2 times:

- Kota Junction
- Sawai Madhopur Junction

== See also ==
- Durg Junction railway station
- Jaipur Junction railway station
- Durg–Jammu Tawi Express
