= Anuppur Junction railway station =

Railway station in Madhya Pradesh, India

Anuppur Junction

General information
- Location: Anuppur, Anuppur district, Madhya Pradesh; India
- Coordinates: 23°07′03″N 81°41′46″E
- Elevation: 489 metres (1,604 ft)
- System: Express train and Passenger train station
- Owner: Indian Railways
- Line: Katni–Bilaspur line
- Platforms: 4
- Tracks: 4

Construction
- Structure type: Standard (on ground)
- Parking: Yes

Other information
- Status: Functioning
- Station code: APR
- Zone(s): South East Central Railway
- Division(s): Bilaspur
Location
- Location within India Location within Madhya Pradesh

Anuppur Junction railway station is a railway station in Anuppur town of Anuppur district in Madhya Pradesh. The station code of Anuppur Junction is 'APR'. It has four platforms. It comes under Bilaspur railway division of South East Central Railway Zone. It is on the Katni–Bilaspur line and connects to and Katni, Bilaspur and Ambikapur.

== Trains ==
- Durg–Firozpur Cantonment Antyodaya Express
- Durg–Hazrat Nizamuddin Humsafar Express
- Sarnath Express
- Bhopal–Bilaspur Express
- Betwa Express
- Durg–Nautanwa Express (via Sultanpur)
- Durg–Nautanwa Express (via Varanasi)
- Hirakud Express
- Amarkantak Express
- Lucknow–Raipur Garib Rath Express
- Durg–Chirimiri Express
- Durg–Ambikapur Express
- Bhopal–Chirimiri Express
- Bilaspur–Rewa Express
- Kalinga Utkal Express
- Durg–Jammu Tawi Superfast Express
- Chhattisgarh Sampark Kranti Superfast Express
- Madan Mahal–Ambikapur Intercity Express
- Shalimar–Udaipur City Weekly Express
- Shalimar–Bhuj Weekly Superfast Express
- Narmada Express
- Durg–Jammu Tawi Express
- Bikaner–Bilaspur Antyodaya Express
- Durg–Ajmer Express
- Visakhapatnam–Bhagat Ki Kothi Express
- Durg–Jaipur Weekly Express
- Valsad–Puri Superfast Express
- Bikaner–Puri Express
