= Durg–Firozpur Cantonment Antyodaya Express =

Train in India

Overview
- Service type: Antyodaya Express
- First service: 1 May 2018; 6 years ago
- Current operator(s): South East Central Railways

Route
- Termini: Durg Junction (DURG); Firozpur Cantonment (FZR)
- Stops: 18
- Distance travelled: 1,671 km (1,038 mi)
- Average journey time: 30h 00m
- Service frequency: Weekly (Note: Run once in a week for every direction.)
- Train number(s): 22895 / 22896

On-board services
- Class(es): Unreserved
- Seating arrangements: Yes
- Sleeping arrangements: No
- Catering facilities: No
- Baggage facilities: Yes

Technical
- Rolling stock: LHB-Antyodaya
- Track gauge: 1,676 mm (5 ft 6 in)
- Operating speed: 62 km/h (39 mph)

The 22895 / 22896 Durg–Firozpur Cantonment Antyodaya Express is a Superfast train belonging to South East Central Railway zone that runs between Durg Junction and Firozpur Cantonment.

It is being operated with 22895/22896 train numbers on a weekly basis.

== Coach composition ==
The trains is completely general coaches trains designed by Indian Railways with features of LED screen display to show information about stations, train speed etc. Vending machines for water. Bio toilets in compartments as well as CCTV cameras and mobile charging points and toilet occupancy indicators.

== Service ==
- 22895/Durg–Firozpur Cantonment Antyodaya Express has an average speed of 58 km/h and covers 1671 km in 28 hrs 40 mins.
- 22896/Firozpur Cantonment–Durg Antyodaya Express has an average speed of 55 km/h and covers 1671 km in 30 hrs 10 mins.

== Route & halts ==
The important halts of the train are:

- Durg Junction
- Raipur Junction
- Uslapur
- Pendra Road
- Anuppur Junction
- Shahdol
- Umaria
- Katni Murwara
- Damoh
- Saugor
- Jhansi Junction
- Delhi Safdarjung
- Rohtak Junction
- Jind Junction
- Jakhal Junction
- Bathinda Junction
- Firozpur Cantonment

== Schedule ==
Train number	Station code	Departure station	Departure time	Departure day	Arrival station	Arrival time	Arrival day
22895	DURG	Durg Junction	07:10 AM	Sun	Firozpur Cantonment	11:50 AM	Mon
22896	FZR	Firozpur Cantonment	00:20 AM	Tue	Durg Junction	06:30 AM	Wed

== Traction ==
Both trains are hauled by a Bhilai Loco Shed-based WAP-7 electric locomotive between Durg Junction and Bathinda Junction. After Bathinda Junction, both trains are hauled by a Ludhiana Loco Shed-based WDM-3A diesel locomotive & vice versa.

== See also ==
- Antyodaya Express
