= Durg–Jammu Tawi Superfast Express =

Train in India

Durg–MCTM Udhampur Superfast Express
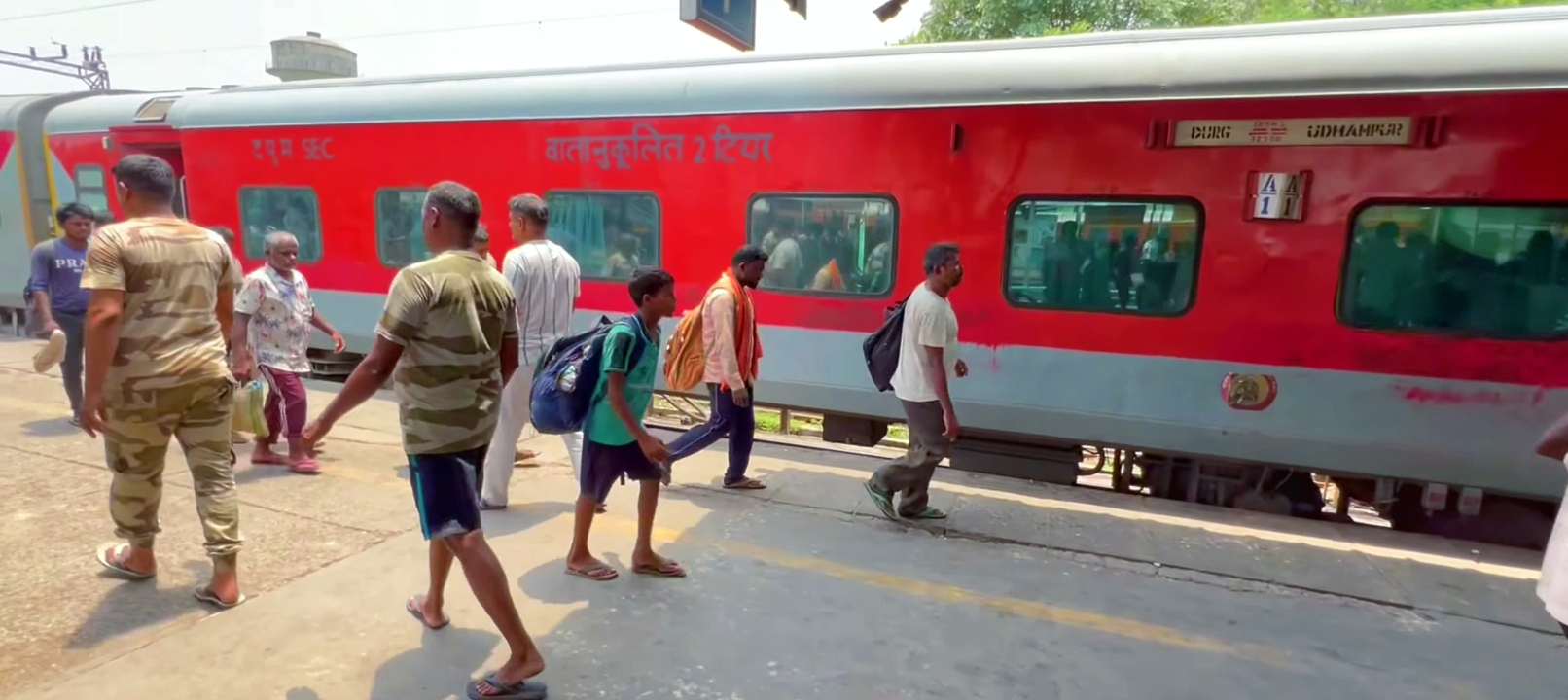
- Durg–MCTM Udhampur Superfast Express At Ambala Cantonment Junction railway station

Overview
- Service type: Superfast
- First service: 3 August 2010; 16 years ago
- Current operator: South East Central Railway

Route
- Termini: Durg Junction (DURG); MCTM Udhampur (MCTM)
- Stops: 18
- Distance travelled: 1,920 km (1,193 mi)
- Average journey time: 31 hours 10 minutes
- Service frequency: Weekly (Note: Runs one day in a week for every direction.)
- Train number: 12549 / 12550

On-board services
- Classes: AC 2 Tier, AC 3 Tier, Sleeper Class, General Unreserved
- Seating arrangements: Yes
- Sleeping arrangements: Yes
- Catering facilities: Available
- Observation facilities: Large windows
- Baggage facilities: No
- Other facilities: Below the seats

Technical
- Rolling stock: LHB coach
- Track gauge: 1,676 mm (5 ft 6 in)
- Operating speed: 62 km/h (39 mph) average including halts.

The 12549 / 12550 Durg–MCTM Udhampur Superfast Express is a Superfast train belonging to South East Central Railway zone that runs between Durg Junction and Martyr Captain Tushar Mahajan Udhampur in India. It is currently being operated with 12549/12550 train numbers on a weekly basis.

== Service ==
The 12549/Durg–MCTM Udhampur Superfast Express has an average speed of 61 km/hrand covers 1,920 kilometres (1,190 mi) in 32h 00m. The 12550/MCTM Udhampur–Durg Weekly Superfast Express has an average speed of 62 km/h and covers 1920 km in 31h 10m.

== Route and halts ==
The important halts of the train are:

- Durg Junction
- Raipur Junction
- Bilaspur Junction
- Anuppur Junction
- Katni Murwara Junction
- Saugor
- Jhansi Junction
- Gwalior Junction
- Agra Cantonment
- Safdarjung
- Ambala Cantonment Junction
- Ludhiana Junction
- Jalandhar Cantonment Junction
- Pathankot Cantonment
- Jammu Tawi
- MCTM Udhampur

== Coach composition ==
The train has standard LHB rakes with a maximum speed of 160 km/h. The train consists of 24 coaches :

- 0.5 First AC
- 2.5 AC II Tier
- 4 AC III Tier
- 9 Sleeper coaches
- 1 Pantry car
- 3 General Unreserved
- 2 Seating cum Luggage Rake

As it shares its rake with 12834 Durg–Hazrat Nizamuddin Chhattisgarh Sampark Kranti, it has been replaced with LHB coach.

== Traction ==
Both trains are hauled by a Tughlakabad Loco Shed-based WAP-7 electric locomotive from Jammu to Bilaspur, from Bilaspur to Durg both trains are hauled by a Bhilai Loco Shed-based WAP-7 electric locomotive and vice versa.

== Rake sharing ==
The train shares its rake with 12823/12824 Chhattisgarh Sampark Kranti Superfast Express.

== See also ==
- Durg Junction railway station
- Jammu Tawi railway station
- Durg–Jammu Tawi Express
- Chhattisgarh Sampark Kranti Superfast Express
