= Bilaspur–Bikaner Express =

Train in India

Bilaspur–Bikaner Superfast Express

Overview
- Service type: Superfast
- First service: 4 February 2016; 10 years ago
- Current operator: South East Central Railway

Route
- Termini: Bilaspur (BSP); Bikaner (BKN)
- Stops: 31
- Distance travelled: 1,884 km (1,171 mi)
- Average journey time: 35 hrs 30 mins
- Service frequency: Bi-weekly
- Train number: 20845 / 20846

On-board services
- Classes: AC 2 Tier, AC 3 Tier, Sleeper 3 Tier, General Unreserved
- Seating arrangements: Yes
- Sleeping arrangements: Yes
- Catering facilities: On-board catering, E-catering
- Observation facilities: Large windows
- Baggage facilities: No
- Other facilities: Below the seats

Technical
- Rolling stock: LHB coach
- Track gauge: 1,676 mm (5 ft 6 in)
- Operating speed: 53 km/h (33 mph) average including halts.
- Rake sharing: Rake sharing with 20843/20844 Bhagat Ki Kothi-Bilaspur Express.

The 20845 / 20846 Bilaspur–Bikaner Superfast Express is a superfast express train of the Indian Railways connecting Bilaspur Junction in Chhattisgarh and Bikaner Junction in Rajasthan. It is currently operated with train numbers 20845/20846, two days per week.

== Service ==
- 20845 Bilaspur–Bikaner Express has an average speed of 53 km/h and covers 1883 km in 35 hrs and 30 mins.
- 20846 Bikaner–Bilaspur Express has an average speed of 51 km/h and covers 1884 km in 36 hours and 50 minutes.

== Route and halts ==
The important halts of the train are:

- Bilaspur Junction
- Raipur Junction
- Durg Junction
- Rajnandgaon
- Gondia Junction
- Nagpur Junction
- Itarsi Junction
- Rani Kamalapati
- Bhopal Junction
- Ujjain Junction
- Nagda Junction
- Kota Junction
- Sawai Madhopur Junction
- Durgapura
- Jaipur Junction
- Nagaur
- Bikaner Junction

== Traction ==
As the route is yet to be fully electrified, it is hauled by a Ajni Loco Shed-based WAP-7 electric locomotive from Bilaspur Junction up to Sawai Madhopur Junction handing over to a Bhagat Ki Kothi Loco Shed-based WDP-4 / WDP-4B / WDP-4D diesel locomotive for the remainder of the journey until Bikaner Junction.

== Coach composition ==
The train consists of 22 LHB coaches :

- 3 AC II Tier
- 3 AC III Tier
- 5 Sleeper Coaches
- 6 General Unreserved
- 2 Second-class Luggage/parcel van.

== Direction reversal ==
The train reverses its direction 3 times:

- Nagpur Junction
- Nagda Junction
- Sawai Madhopur Junction

== See also ==
- Bikaner–Puri Express
