= Durg–Nautanwa Express (via Sultanpur) =

Train in India

Overview
- Service type: Express
- First service: 28 December 2006; 18 years ago
- Current operator(s): South East Central Railway

Route
- Termini: Durg (DURG); Nautanwa (NTV)
- Stops: 23
- Distance travelled: 1,145 km (711 mi)
- Average journey time: 26 hrs 50 min
- Service frequency: Weekly
- Train number(s): 18205 / 18206

On-board services
- Class(es): AC 2 tier, AC 3 tier, Sleeper Class, General Unreserved
- Seating arrangements: Yes
- Sleeping arrangements: Yes
- Catering facilities: On-board catering, E-catering
- Observation facilities: Large windows
- Baggage facilities: No
- Other facilities: Below the seats

Technical
- Rolling stock: LHB coach
- Track gauge: 1,676 mm (5 ft 6 in)
- Operating speed: 43 km/h (27 mph) average including halts.

The 18205 / 18206 Durg–Nautanwa Express is an Express train belonging to the South East Central Railway zone that runs between Durg Junction and Nautanwa in India. It is currently being operated with train numbers 18205/18206 on a weekly basis.

== Service ==
The 18205/Durg–Nautanwa Express has an average speed of 43 km/h and covers 1151 km in 26h 55m. The 18206/Nautanwa–Durg Express averages 39 km/h and covers 1151 km in 29h 20m.

== Route & halts ==
The important halts of the train are:

- Durg Junction
- Bhilai Power House
- Raipur Junction
- Bilaspur Junction
- Pendra Road
- Anuppur Junction
- Shahdol
- Katni Junction
- Satna Junction
- Manikpur Junction
- Allahabad Junction
- Pratapgarh Junction
- Sultanpur Junction
- Faizabad Junction
- Ayodhya Junction
- Mankapur Junction
- Basti
- Gorakhpur Junction
- Anand Nagar Junction
- Nautanwa

== Coach composition ==
The train has standard LHB rakes with a max speed of 110 kmph. The train consists of 21 coache

== Traction ==
Both trains are hauled by a Bhilai based WAP-7 twin locomotive from Durg to Prayagraj. From Prayagraj it is hauled by an twin from wap 7 Gorakhpur locomotive to Nautanwa, with the same being used in the opposite direction

== Direction reversal ==
Train reverses its direction 2 times:

- Allahabad Junction
- Faizabad Junction
- Gorakhpur Junction

== See also ==
- Nautanwa
- Durg Junction
- Durg–Nautanwa Express (via Varanasi)
- Durg–Ajmer Express
