= Mahanadi Express =

Train in India

The Mahanadi Express was a train which ran between Bhopal, the capital city of Madhya Pradesh and Bilaspur, a major city in Chhattisgarh. The train numbered as 18225 and 18226. It was named for an important river of the state called Mahanadi.

== Route ==
Its important halts were Rani Kamalapati, Narmadapuram, Itarsi Junction, Amla Junction, Betul, Nagpur Junction, Gondia Junction, Durg Junction, Raipur Junction and Bilaspur Junction. AC 2, AC 3 and sleeper coaches were available in this train.

It ran on a triweekly basis from both the sites and its rake was shared by Amarkantak Express which used to run on a triweekly basis via Jabalpur Junction. Later, in 2005, this train was cancelled and the Amarkantak Express was made daily.
