= Durg–Hazrat Nizamuddin Humsafar Express =

Train in India

Durg - Hazrat Nizamuddin Humsafar Express
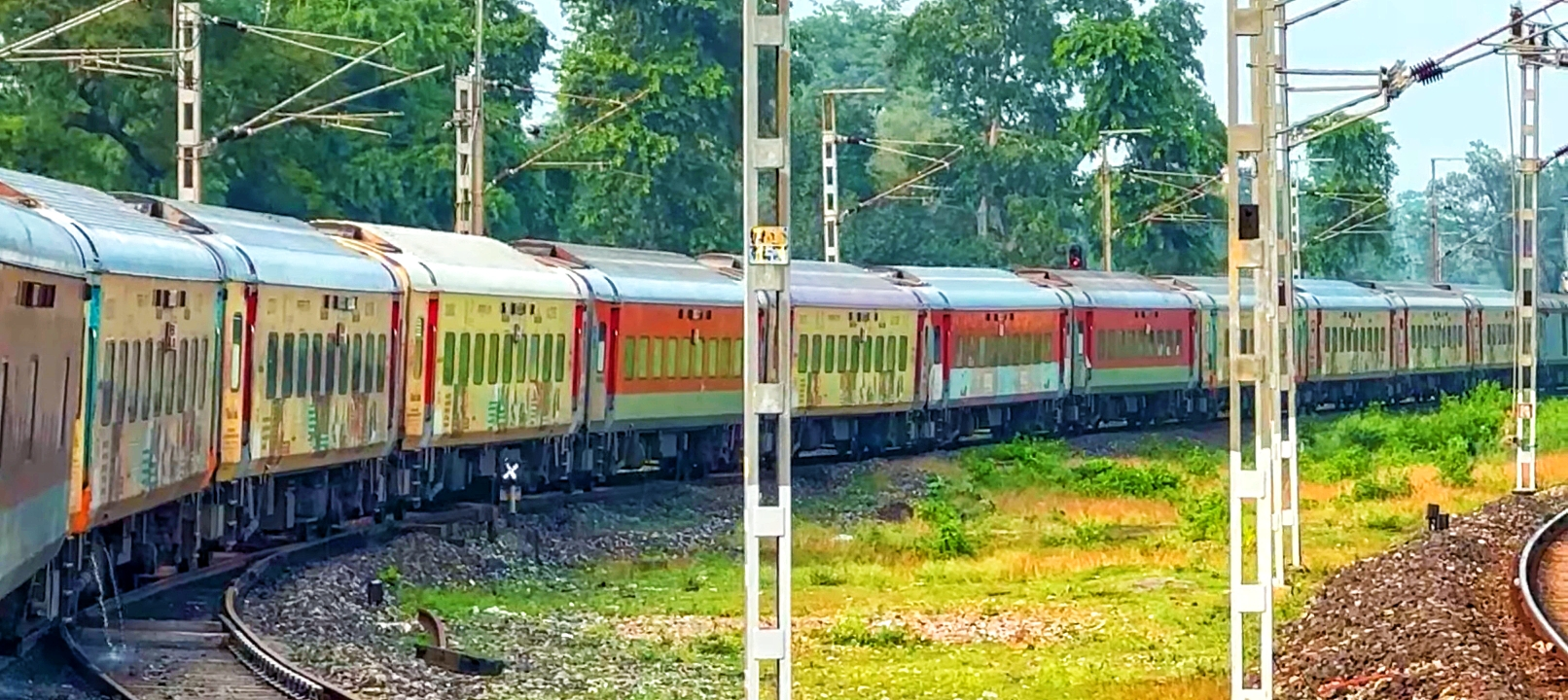
- DURG-NZM Humsafar Express At Mathura Junction railway station

Overview
- Service type: Humsafar Express
- First service: 28 April 2017; 9 years ago
- Current operator: South East Central Railways

Route
- Termini: Durg Junction (DURG); Hazrat Nizamuddin (NZM)
- Stops: 14
- Distance travelled: 1,280 km (795 mi)
- Average journey time: 21h 20min
- Service frequency: Bi - Weekly
- Train number: 22867 / 22868

On-board services
- Class: AC 3 tier
- Seating arrangements: No
- Sleeping arrangements: Yes
- Catering facilities: Available
- Observation facilities: Large windows

Technical
- Rolling stock: LHB Humsafar
- Track gauge: 1,676 mm (5 ft 6 in)
- Operating speed: 59 km/h (37 mph) average including halts
Route map
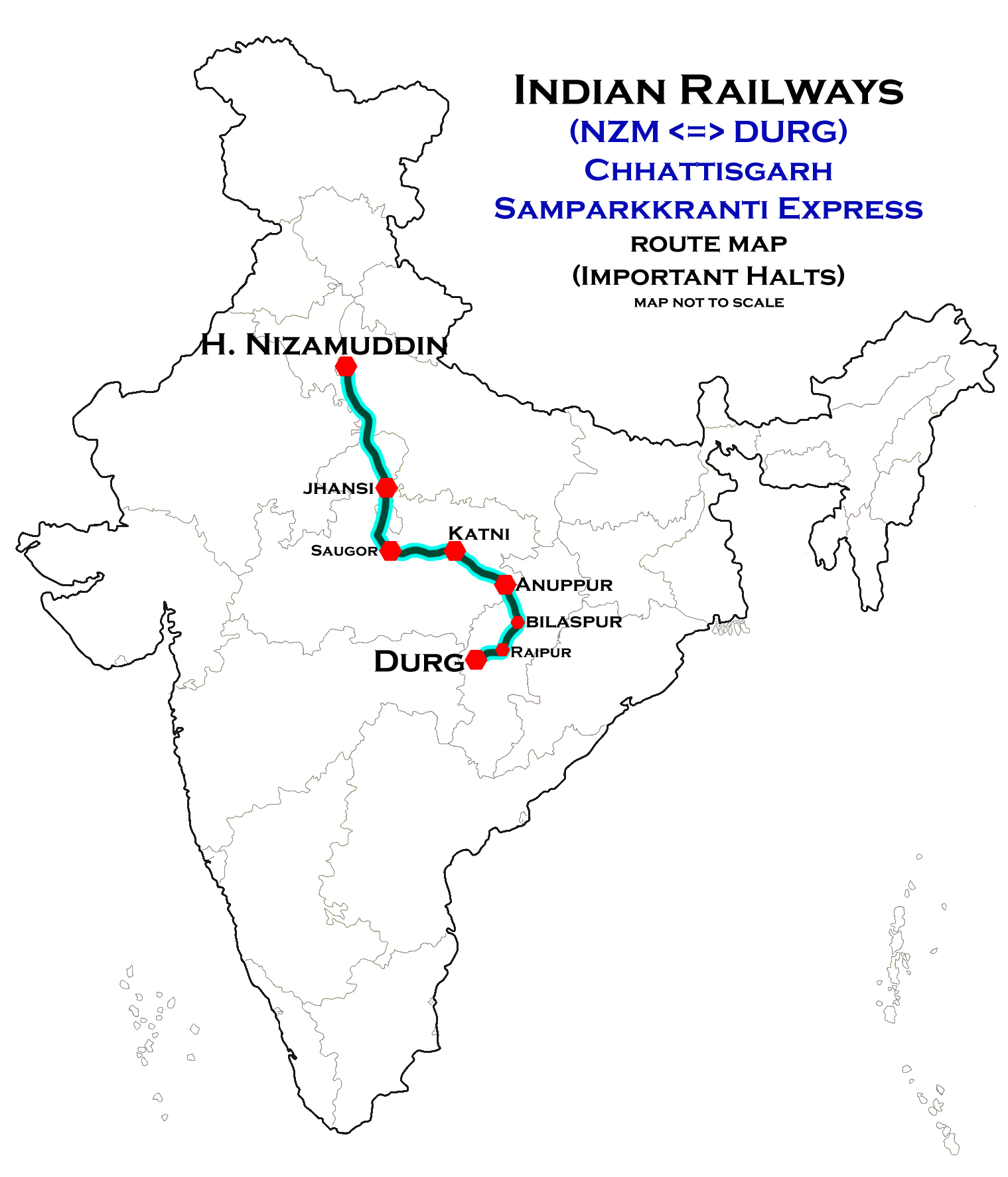

The 22867 / 22868 Durg - Hazrat Nizamuddin Humsafar Express is a superfast express train of the Indian Railways connecting Durg Junction in Chhattisgarh and Hazrat Nizamuddin in Delhi. It is currently being operated with 22867/22868 train numbers on bi-weekly basis.

== Coach composition ==
The train is completely 3-tier AC sleeper designed by Indian Railways with features of LED screen display to show information about stations, train speed etc. and will have announcement system as well, Vending machines for tea, coffee and milk, Bio toilets in compartments as well as CCTV cameras.

== Service ==
It averages 60 km/h as 22867 Humsafar Express starts on Tuesday and Friday from Durg Junction covering 1280 km in 21 hrs 20 mins & 58 km/h as 22868 Humsafar Express starts on Wednesday and Saturday from Hazrat Nizamuddin covering 1280 kilometer in 22 hours.

== Traction ==
Both trains are hauled by a WAP 7 locomotive of Bhilai Electric Locomotive Shed on its entire journey.

== Route and halts ==
1. Durg
2. Raipur
3. Bhatapara
4. Bilaspur Junction
5. Pendra Road
6. Anuppur
7. Shahdol
8. Umaria
9. Katni Murwara
10. Damoh
11. Saugor
12. Jhansi Junction
13. Gwalior Junction
14. Agra Cantonment
15. Mathura Junction
16. Hazrat Nizamuddin

== See also ==
- Humsafar Express
