= Chhattisgarh Sampark Kranti Superfast Express =

Train in India

Chhattisgarh Sampark Kranti Express
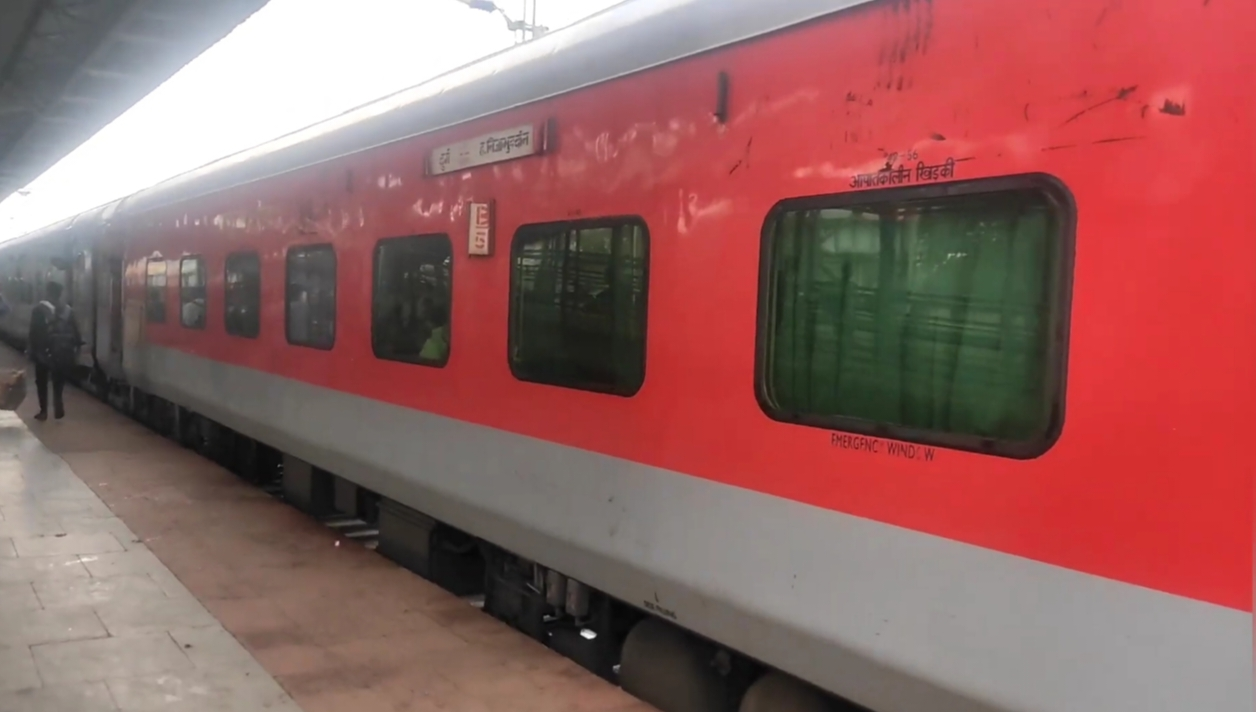
- Chhattisgarh Sampark Kranti Express At Mathura Junction railway station

Overview
- Service type: Sampark Kranti Express
- Locale: Chhattisgarh, Madhya Pradesh, Uttar Pradesh, Haryana & Delhi
- First service: 21 March 2005; 21 years ago
- Current operator: South East Central Railway

Route
- Termini: Durg Junction (DURG); Hazrat Nizamuddin (NZM)
- Stops: 11
- Distance travelled: 1,280 km (795 mi)
- Average journey time: 21 hours 20 minutes
- Service frequency: Tri-weekly
- Train number: 12823 / 12824

On-board services
- Classes: AC First Class, AC 2 tier, AC 3 tier, Sleeper class, General Unreserved
- Seating arrangements: Yes
- Sleeping arrangements: Yes
- Catering facilities: Available
- Observation facilities: Large windows
- Baggage facilities: No
- Other facilities: Below the seats

Technical
- Rolling stock: LHB coach
- Track gauge: 1,676 mm (5 ft 6 in)
- Operating speed: 60 km/h (37 mph) average including halts.
Route map
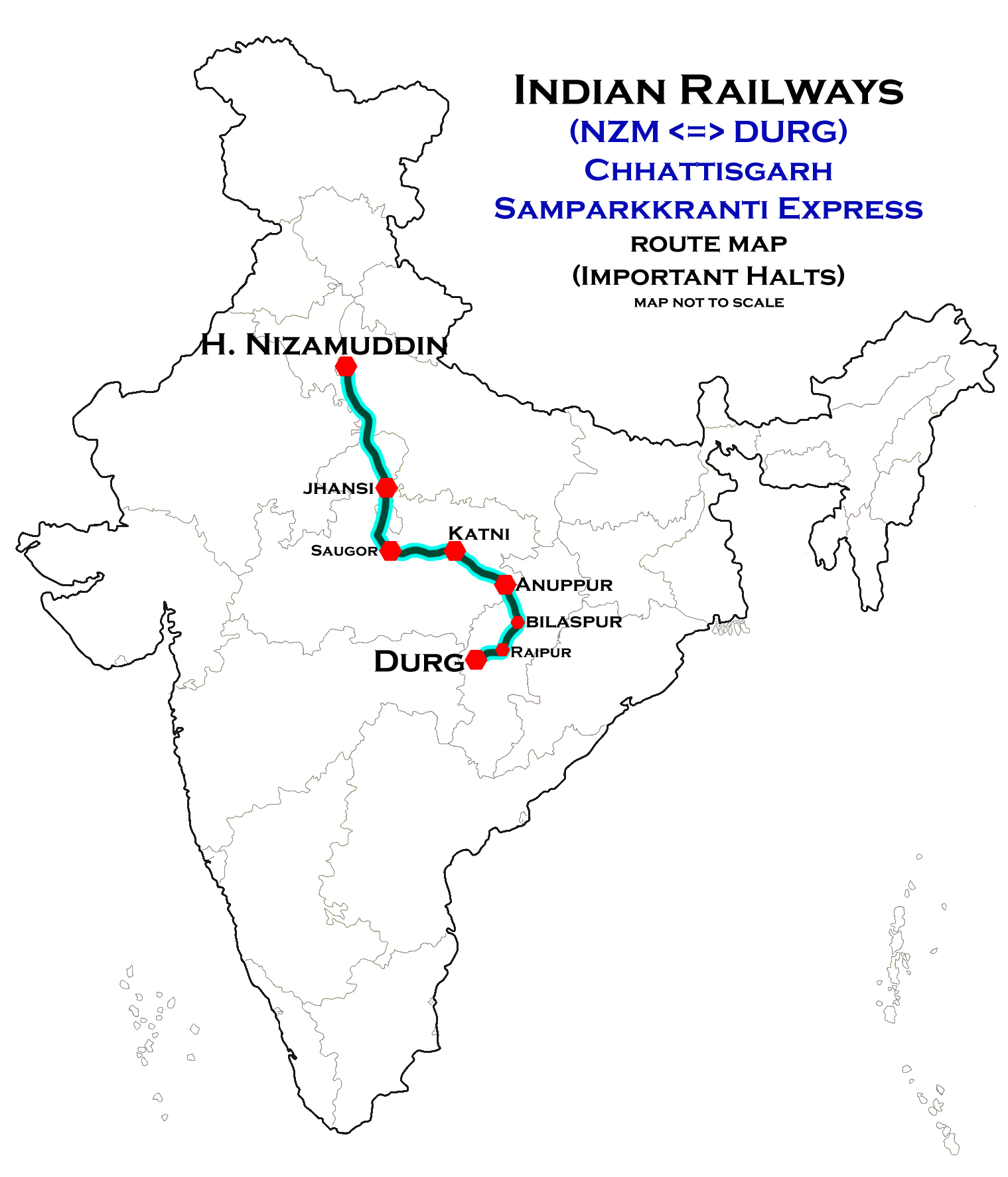

The 12823 / 12824 Chhattisgarh Sampark Kranti Express is an India Superfast express train belonging to Indian Railways that runs between Durg Junction and Hazrat Nizamuddin in India, and is also called the king of South East Central Railway. It operates as train number 12823 from Durg to Hazrat Nizamuddin and as train number 12824 in the reverse direction.

== Coaches ==
The 12823/12824 Chhattisgarh Sampark Kranti Superfast Express presently has 1 AC 1st Class cum AC 2 tier, 2 AC 2 tier, 1 AC 2 cum AC 3 tier, 4 AC 3 tier, 10 Sleeper class, 6 General Unreserved coaches & 1 Pantry car. As with most train services in India, coach composition may be amended at the discretion of Indian Railways depending on demand. It is operating with LHB coach since 2017.

== Service ==
The 12823 Chhattisgarh Sampark Kranti Superfast Express covers the distance of 1281 kilometres in 21 hours 05 mins (60.76 km/h) & 1284 kilometres in 21 hours 45 mins as 12824 Chhattisgarh Sampark Kranti Superfast Express (59.03 km/h). As the average speed of the train is more than 55 km/h, its fare includes a Superfast surcharge.

It reverses direction at Bilaspur Junction.

== Route & halts ==
It runs from Durg via Raipur Junction, Bhatapara, Bilaspur Junction, Pendra Road, Anuppur Junction, Shahdol, Umaria, Katni Murwara Junction, Saugor, Jhansi Junction to Hazrat Nizamuddin.

== Traction ==
As the route is fully electrified, it is hauled by WAP-7 or WAP-5 locomotive of Bhilai Loco Shed between Durg and Hazrat Nizamuddin.

== Direction reversal ==
- Bilaspur Junction

== Schedule ==
- 12823 Chhattisgarh Sampark Kranti Superfast Express leaves Durg every Monday, Thursday, Saturday and reaches Hazrat Nizamuddin the next day.
- 12824 Chhattisgarh Sampark Kranti Superfast Express leaves Hazrat Nizamuddin every Sunday, Tuesday, Friday and reaches Durg the next day.
