= Pendra Road railway station =

Railway station in Chhattisgarh

Pendra Road

General information
- Location: Pendra Road, Gaurela-Pendra-Marwahi district, Chhattisgarh; India
- Coordinates: 22.7561°N 81.8991°E
- Elevation: 618 metres (2,028 ft)
- System: Indian Railways station
- Owner: Indian Railways
- Operator: South East Central Railway
- Line: Bilaspur–Katni line
- Platforms: 3
- Tracks: 5 (Double electrified BG)
- Connections: Auto stand

Construction
- Structure type: Standard (on-ground station)
- Parking: yes
- Cycle facilities: yes

Other information
- Status: Functioning
- Station code: PND
- Zone(s): South East Central Railway
- Division(s): Bilaspur

History
- Former names: Bengal Nagpur Railway
Location

Pendra Road railway station is a main railway station in Gaurella-Pendra-Marwahi district, Chhattisgarh. Its code is PND. It serves Pendra city as well as Gaurella. The station consists of three platforms. The platforms are well sheltered. It has facilities including water and sanitation.

== Major trains ==
The following trains run from Pendra Road railway station:

- Ajmer–Durg Weekly Express
- Amarkantak Express
- Ambikapur Durg Express-cum-Passenger
- Betwa Express
- Bhagat Ki Kothi–Visakhapatnam Weekly Express
- Bhopal Bilaspur Express
- Bilaspur–Rewa Fast Passenger
- Bilaspur Chirmiri Passenger
- Bilaspur Katni MEMU
- Bilaspur Pendra Road MEMU
- Chhattisgarh Sampark Kranti Superfast Express
- Chirmiri Durg Express-cum-Passenger
- Durg–Jaipur Weekly Express
- Durg–Jammu Tawi Express (via Amritsar)
- Durg–Nautanwa Express (via Varanasi)
- Durg–Nautanwa Express (via Sultanpur)
- Durg–Jammu Weekly Superfast Express
- Hirakud Express
- Kalinga Utkal Express
- Lucknow–Raipur Garib Rath Express
- Narmada Express
- Valsad–Puri Superfast Express
- Sarnath Express
- Shalimar–Udaipur City Weekly Express
