= Sarnath Express =

Train in India

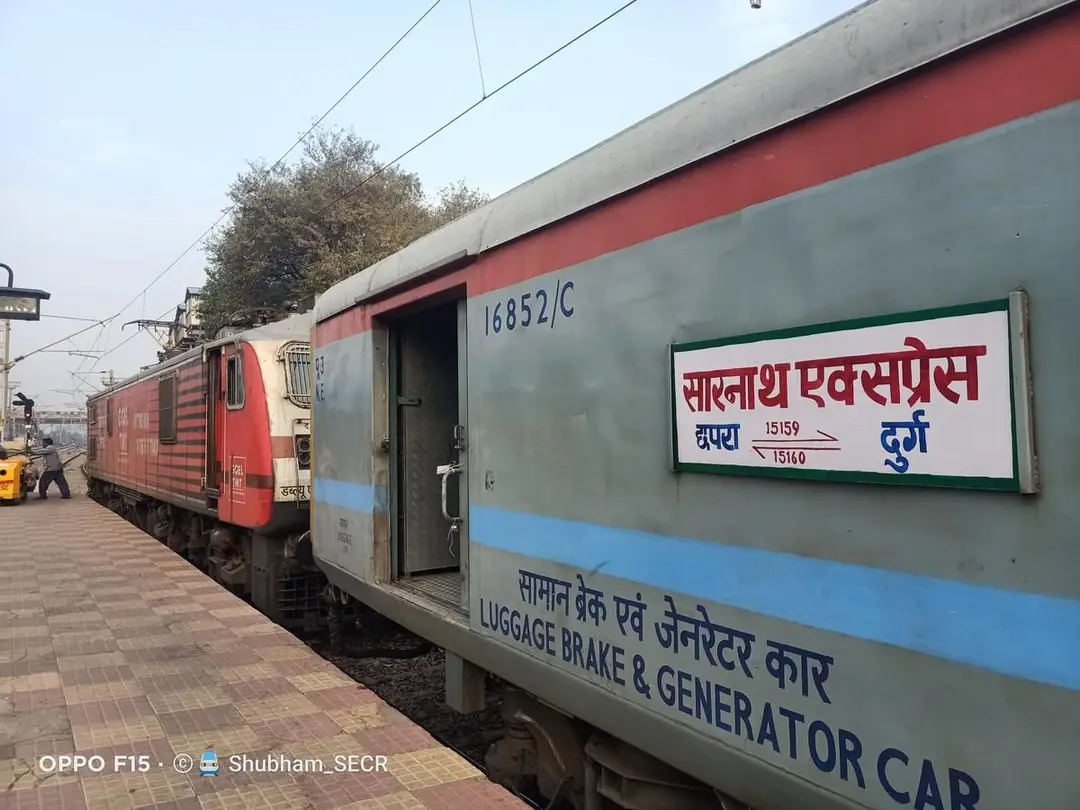

Overview
- Service type: Express train
- Locale: Bihar, Uttar Pradesh, Madhya Pradesh & Chhattisgarh
- First service: 2 November 1978; 47 years ago
- Current operator: North Eastern Railway

Route
- Termini: Chhapra (CPR); Durg (DURG)
- Stops: 42
- Distance travelled: 1,077 km (669 mi)
- Average journey time: 24 hours (Approx.)
- Service frequency: Daily
- Train number: 15159 / 15160

On-board services
- Classes: AC first, AC 2 tier, AC 3 tier, Sleeper class, General Unreserved
- Seating arrangements: Yes
- Sleeping arrangements: Yes
- Auto-rack arrangements: No
- Catering facilities: On-board catering E-catering
- Observation facilities: Large windows
- Baggage facilities: Available

Technical
- Rolling stock: LHB coach
- Track gauge: 1,676 mm (5 ft 6 in)
- Operating speed: 45 km/h (28 mph) average including halts.
Route map
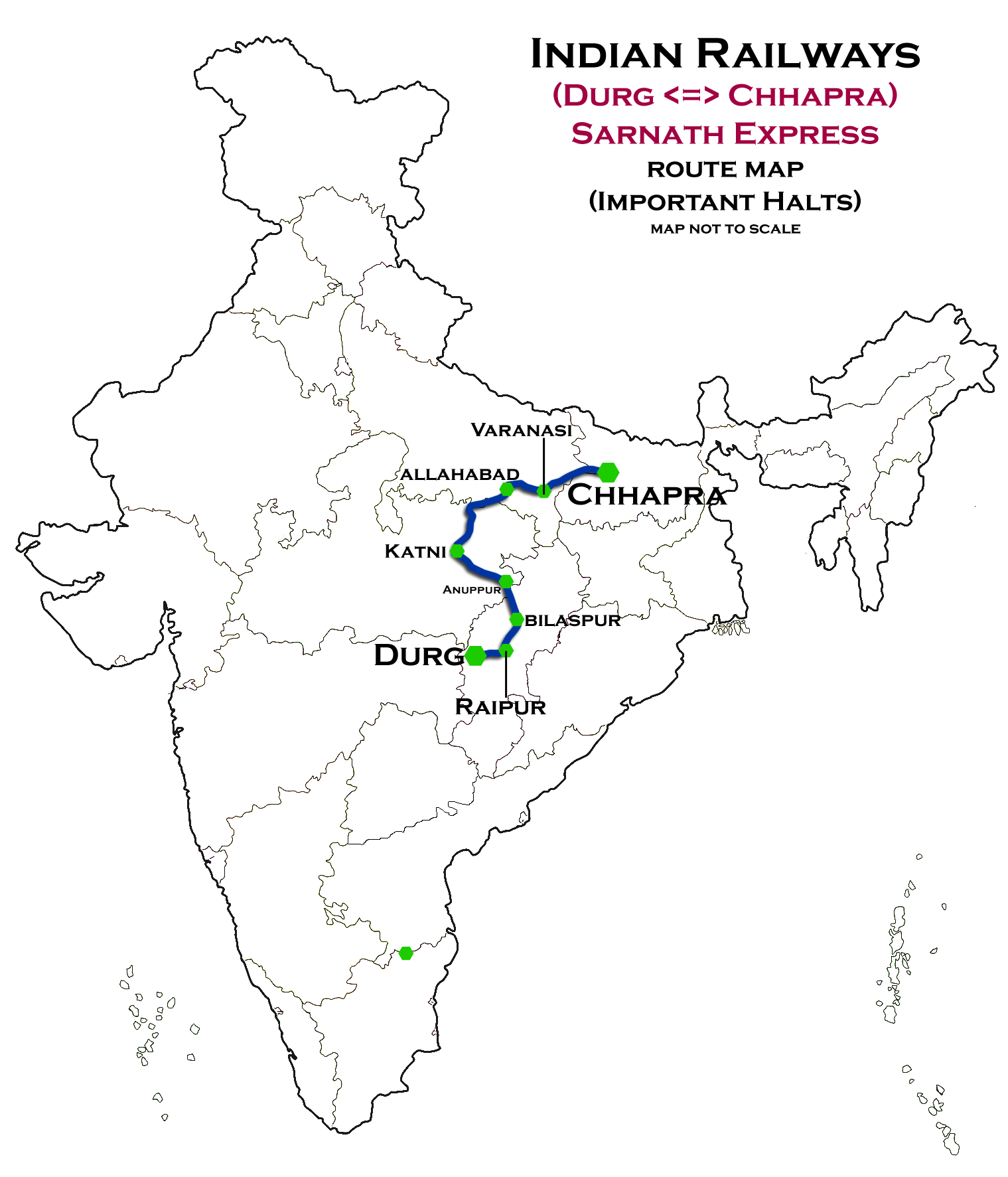

The 15159 / 15160 Sarnath Express is a legendary express train belonging to North Eastern Railway connecting Chhapra Junction with Durg Junction. Sarnath Express initially used to run between Varanasi Junction and Durg Junction, whereas at present, the service extended up to Chhapra Junction.

== Overview ==
Sarnath Express being numbered as No.15159 / 15160 running from Chhapra Junction with Durg Junction. The then Minister of Railways, Pawan Kumar Bansal announced during Railway Budget for 2013–2014 that the service will be extended up to Muzaffarpur Junction and Gonda Junction.

== Route & halts ==
- Chhapra Junction
- Ballia
- Ghazipur City
- Varanasi Junction
- Prayagraj Junction
- Naini Junction
- Manikpur Junction
- Satna Junction
- Maihar
- Katni Junction
- Shahdol
- Anuppur Junction
- Pendra Road
- Uslapur
- Raipur Junction
- Bhilai
- Durg Junction

== Traction ==
Both trains are hauled by a Lallaguda Loco Shed or Bhilai Loco Shed-based WAP-7 electric locomotive from Chhapra to Durg and vice versa.

== Rakes ==
The service has one First A/C (HA1), two Second A/C (2A), eight Third A/C (3A) and 05 Sleeper Class (LS) of Couchette car type in addition to five General Class (UR/GS) of Corridor coach type and two Seating–Luggage rakes (SLR). During 16 March 2017, it was announced by North Eastern Railway zone that an additional Third A/C coach will be added to the existing for a period of three months from 19 March 2017 – 19 June 2017 for both up and down services. (Note: The coach composition is subject to change.)

Loco	1	2	3	4	5	6	7	8	9	10	11	12	13	14	15	16	17	18	19	20	21	
	EOG	GEN	GEN	HA1	A1	A2	B6	B5	B4	B3	B2	B1	S7	S6	S5	S4	S3	S2	S1	GEN	EOG	2

== Route ==
The service originates as Train.No.15159 from Chhapra Junction and traverses through Ghazipur City, Varanasi Junction, Allahabad Junction Katni Junction Uslapur, a satellite station of Bilaspur, Raipur before it reaches final destination at Durg Junction. The return journey commences as Train.No.15160 and follows the same route to the destination at Chhapra Junction. (Note: The schedule and routes are subject to change for administrative reasons.)
