= Kalinga Utkal Express =

Train in India

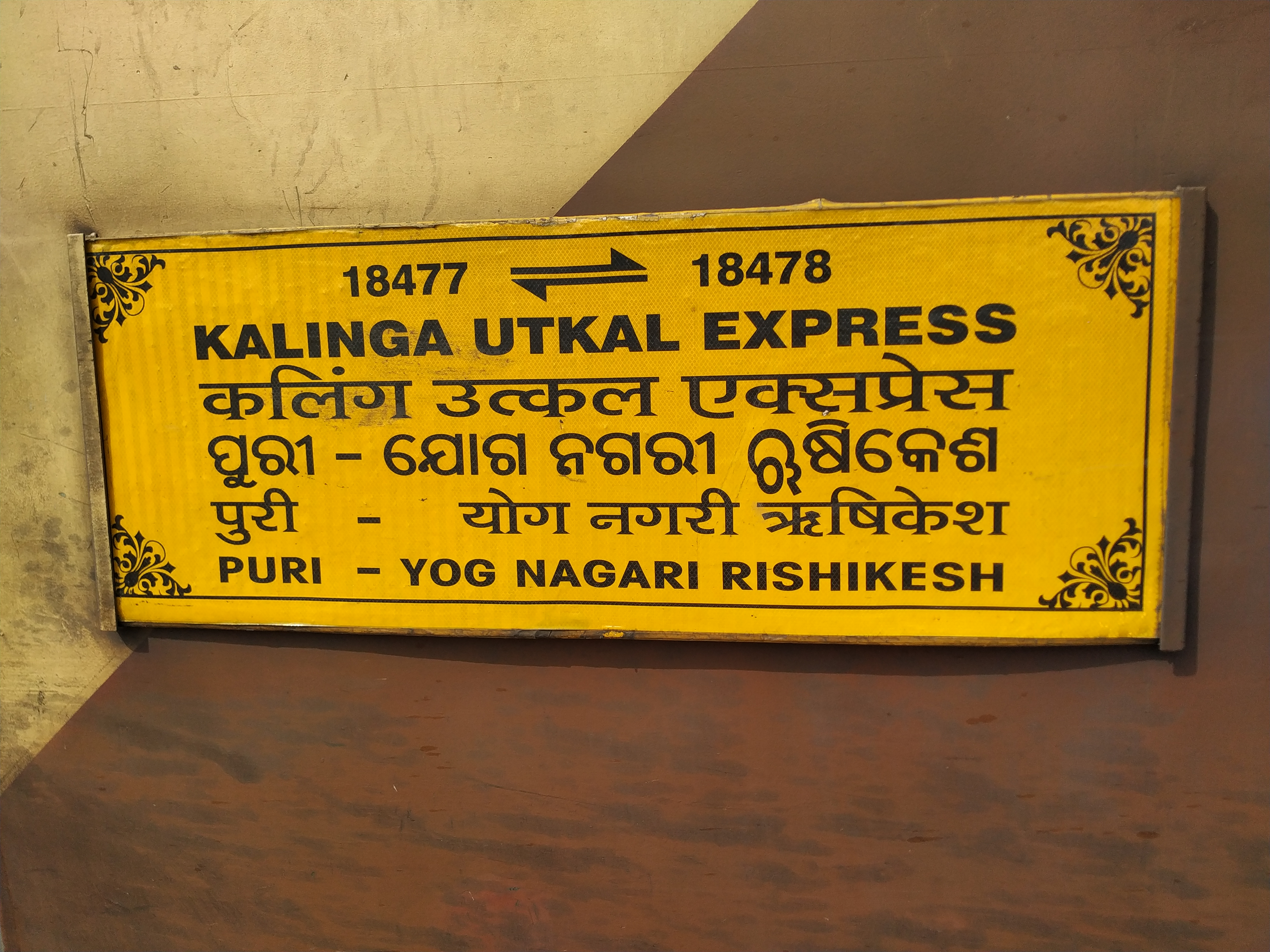
- Kalinga Utkal Express train board

Overview
- Service type: Express
- Locale: Odisha, West Bengal, Jharkhand, Chhattisgarh, Madhya Pradesh, Uttar Pradesh, Haryana, Delhi & Uttarakhand
- First service: 1 October 1969; 56 years ago (initial service between Puri and New Delhi)
- Current operator: East Coast Railways

Route
- Termini: Puri (PURI); Yog Nagari Rishikesh (YNRK)
- Stops: 73
- Distance travelled: 2,367 km (1,471 mi)
- Average journey time: 48 hours 25 minutes
- Service frequency: Daily
- Train number: 18477 / 18478

On-board services
- Classes: AC 1 Tier, AC 2 Tier, AC 3 Tier, Sleeper Class, General Unreserved
- Seating arrangements: Yes
- Sleeping arrangements: Yes
- Catering facilities: Available
- Baggage facilities: No

Technical
- Rolling stock: LHB coach
- Track gauge: 1,676 mm (5 ft 6 in)
- Operating speed: 49 km/h (30 mph) average including halts
Route map
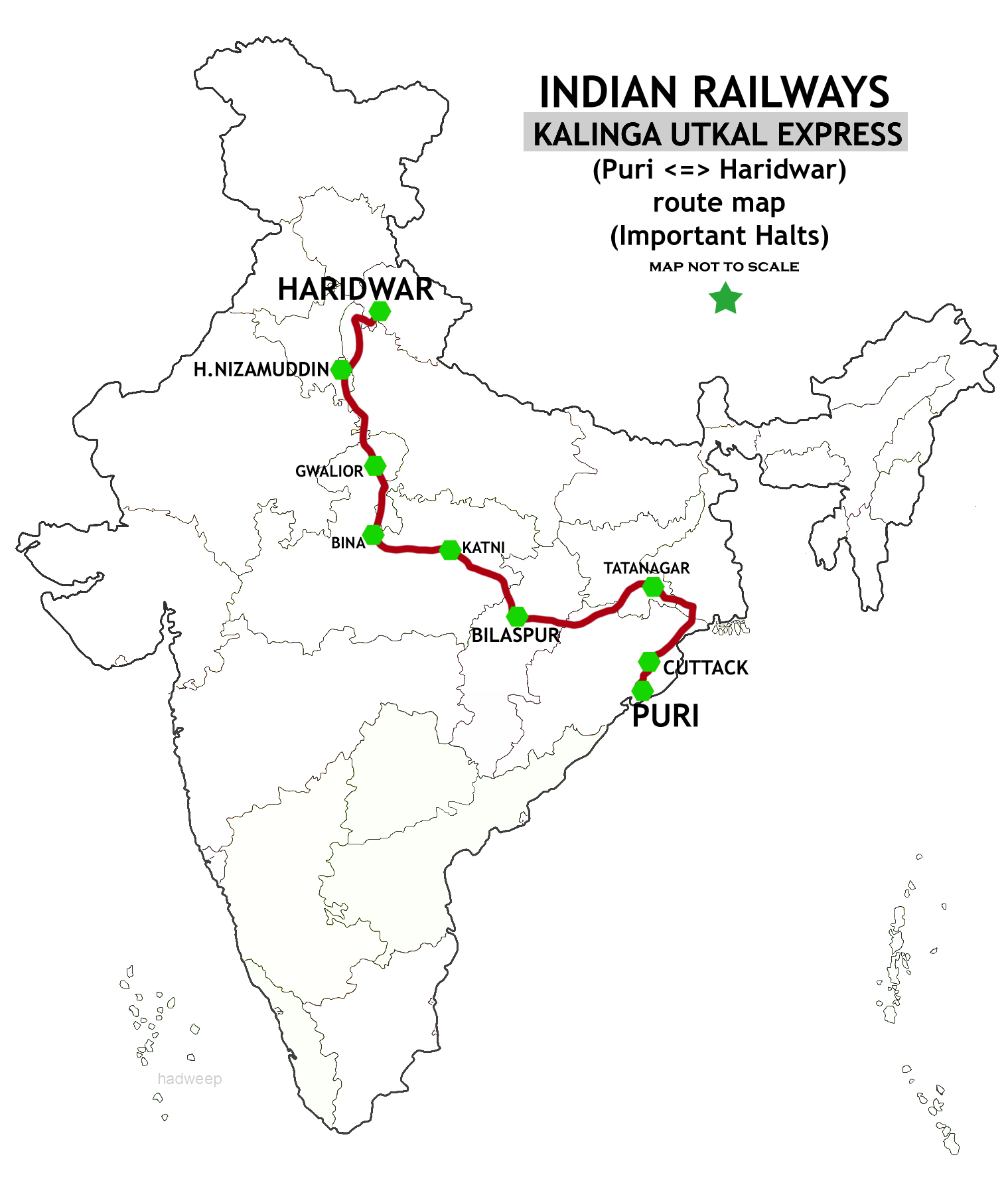
- Kalinga Utkal Express Route Map

The 18477 / 18478 Kalinga Utkal Express is an important Express of Indian Railways connecting two pilgrimage centres of India, Yog Nagari Rishikesh and Puri.

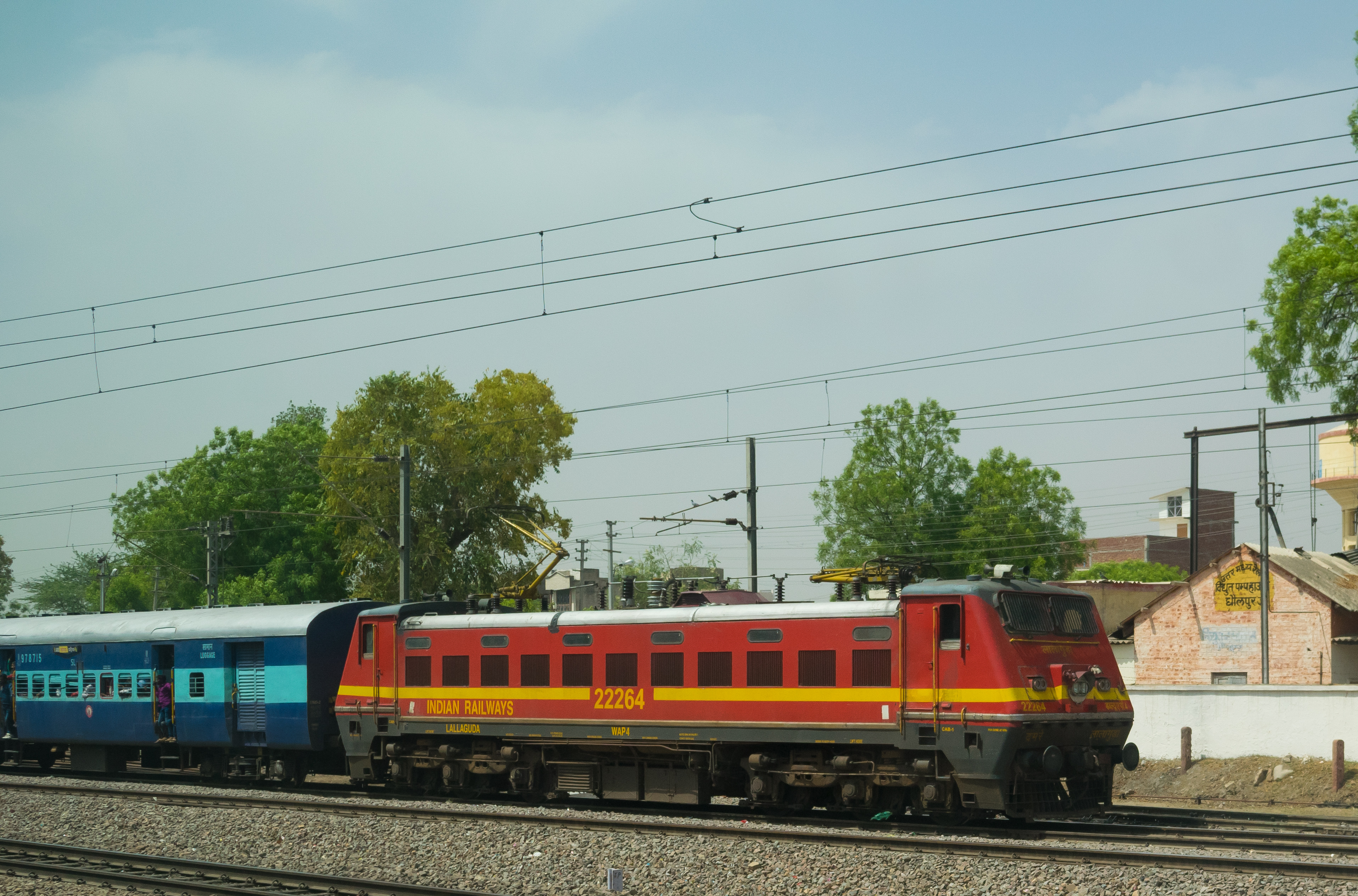
Kaling Utkal Express near Dholpur

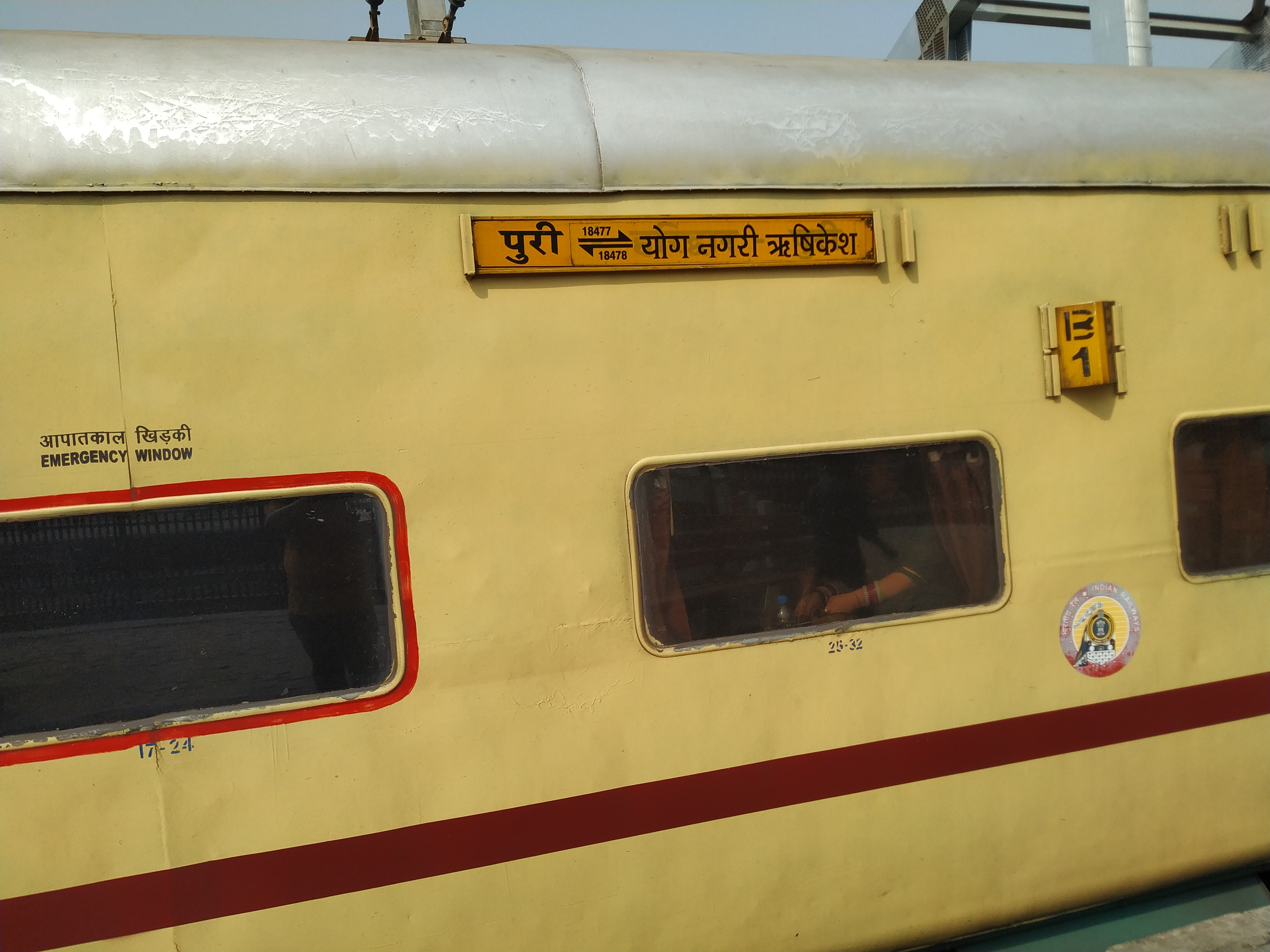
Kalinga Utkal Express in Ghaziabad Junction

== History ==
Kalinga Utkal Express was introduced in 1969 as train no.77/78 Utkal Express, a bi-weekly train from Puri to Hazrat Nizamuddin. The frequency of the train was later increased to 4 days a week. In 1983 Utkal Express was merged with erstwhile train no.143/144 Kalinga Express to become Kalinga Utkal Express and the frequency was also increased to daily.

== Route and halts ==
The train runs from Puri via Khurda Road, Bhubaneswar, Cuttack, Balasore, Tatanagar, Chakradharpur, Rourkela, Jharsuguda, Raigarh, Champa, Bilaspur, Pendra Road, Anuppur Junction, Shahdol, Umaria, Katni Murwara, Damoh, Saugor, Khurai, Jhansi Junction, Gwalior, Dholpur, Agra Cantonment, Mathura Junction, Hazrat Nizamuddin, Meerut City, Muzaffarnagar, Tapri Junction, Roorkee, Haridwar to Yog Nagari Rishikesh.

== Locomotive ==
earlier was WAG-9. It is hauled by Tughlakabad / Ghaziabad-based WAP-7 locomotive on its entire journey.

== Rakes ==
This train has total 5 rakes running between Puri & Haridwar. earlier was ICF rakes, now The train has 27 coaches comprising
Three A/C 2-Tier
One A/C 1-Tier
Four A/C 3-tier
Twelve Sleeper class
Four General compartments (unreserved)
Two Luggage van (SLR) and
One pantry car. (Note: The coach composition is subject to change.)

Loco	1	2	3	4	5	6	7	8	9	10	11	12	13	14	15	16	17	18	19	20	21	22	23	24	25	26	27
	SLR	GS	B1	A1	A2	A3	H1	B2	B3	B4	S1	S2	PC	S3	S4	S5	S6	S7	S8	S9	S10	S11	S12	GS	GS	SLR	

== Accidents ==
On 19 August 2017, heading to Haridwar in Uttarakhand from Puri in Odisha, the Kalinga-Utkal Express derailed with fourteen coaches of the train going off track in Khatauli in Uttar Pradesh. The incident resulted in the death of 23 people while injuring 40 others. Minister for Railways, Suresh Prabhu, ordered an inquiry into the incident.
