= Jabalpur–Ambikapur Intercity Express =

Train in India

Jabalpur-Ambikapur Intercity Express
Overview
- Service type: Express
- Locale: Madhya Pradesh & Chhattisgarh
- First service: March 24, 2010; 16 years ago
- Current operator: West Central Railway

Route
- Termini: Jabalpur Junction (JBP); Ambikapur (ABKP)
- Stops: 12
- Distance travelled: 428 km (266 mi)
- Average journey time: 10 hours 15 minutes
- Service frequency: Daily
- Train number: 11265 / 11266

On-board services
- Classes: AC Chair car, Chair Car, General Unreserved
- Seating arrangements: Yes
- Sleeping arrangements: No
- Auto-rack arrangements: Overhead racks
- Catering facilities: On-board catering, E-catering
- Observation facilities: Large windows
- Baggage facilities: No
- Other facilities: Below the seats

Technical
- Rolling stock: LHB coach
- Track gauge: 1,676 mm (5 ft 6 in)
- Operating speed: 44 km/h (27 mph) average including halts.

The 11265 / 11266 Jabalpur-Ambikapur Intercity Express is an intercity train of the Indian Railways connecting Jabalpur near Jabalpur city in Madhya Pradesh and Ambikapur of Chhattisgarh.

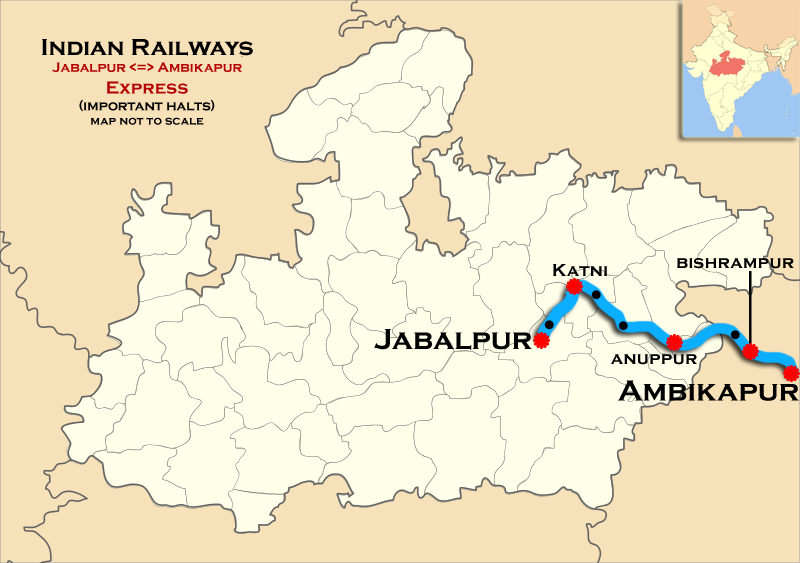
(Jabalpur - Ambikapur) Express route map

== Number and nomenclature ==
The train was announced in the railway budget 2009–2010 by railway minister Mamata Banerjee. The train number is 11265/11266. This train has great importance specially for the passengers travelling from Jabalpur to Ambikapur as time taken to reach Ambikapur has reduced drastically. To decongest the load of train in Jabalpur Railway station, the train was recently shifted to its new terminal, Madan Mahal.

== Departure and arrival ==
The train departs from Madan Mahal daily at 13:40 and reaches Ambikapur at 23:00. It departs from Ambikapur every day at 6:15 and reaches Madan Mahal at 15:15

== Route and halts ==
The important halts of the train are:

- Jabalpur Junction
- Sihora Road
- Katni Junction
- Umaria
- Shahdol
- Anuppur Junction
- Ambikapur

== Coach composite ==
The train has standard ICF rakes with max speed of 110 kmph. The train consists of 15 coaches:

- 1 AC III Tier Chair Car
- 10 Chair Car
- 2 General
- 2 Second-class Luggage/parcel van

== Traction ==
Both trains are hauled by an Itarsi Loco Shed based WAP-7 electric locomotive from Jabalpur to Ambikapur and vice versa.

== Rake sharing ==
This train shares its rake with

- 11651/11652 Jabalpur-Singrauli Intercity Express
- 22189/22190 Jabalpur-Rewa Intercity Express

== See also ==
- Jabalpur - Singrauli Intercity Express
- Jabalpur - Habibganj Intercity Express
- Jabalpur–Rewa Intercity Express
