= Gaurella =

Gaurella Pendra Road
- Town
- Nickname: Gaurella
- Location in Chhattisgarh, India Gaurella (India)
- Coordinates: 22°45′22.373″N 81°54′0.106″E
- Country: India
- State: Chhattisgarh
- District: Gaurela-Pendra-Marwahi district

Government
  - Type: Nagar Palika

Population (2001)
  - Total: 15,173

Languages
  - Official: Hindi, Chhattisgarhi
- Time zone: UTC+5:30 (IST)
- PIN: 495117
- Telephone code: 07751
- Vehicle registration: CG 31

Gaurella, also known as Pendra road, is a Census town part of Gaurella-Pendra-Marwahi district in the state of Chhattisgarh, India. Distt Headquarter is Gaurella. Gaurella and Pendra are twin cities.

Gaurella is a town and District Headquarter of GPM District Of Chhattisgarh, and it is also known as Pendra road, The railway station of Gaurela town is Pendra Road railway station on Bilaspur - Katni rail route of South East Central Railway, and is the point on the S.E.C railway. Height from sea level is 618.4 m. It is the nearest station to the holy pilgrimage site of Amarkantak. Numerous rivers, including the Arpa, Johila, Son, and Tipan, flow through the region. The Narmada, the country's most prominent and sacred river, originates in Amarkantak, located just 30 kilometers from Gaurela. For Amarkantak pilgrimage and sightseeing, alight at Pendra Road railway station. The nearest airports to Gaurela are Bilaspur (100 km), Raipur (226 km), and Jabalpur (270 km). It is also easily accessible by road from Bilaspur, Shahdol, Ambikapur, Katni, and Jabalpur.

The Arpa River is a major river in Chhattisgarh. Government records and visual representations place the Arpa River's origin in Khodri village in the Gaurela block. However, some locals believe the Arpa originates in Amarpur village near Pendra Nagar. The Son River is mythologically believed to originate in Sonmuda in Amarkantak, Madhya Pradesh, where it cascades down as a waterfall and disappears, before flowing continuously from the Son Kund in Sonbacharwar village in Gaurela Pendra Marwahi district. Sonbacharwar is considered the actual source of the Son River. The Juhila River also originates near the Jwaleshwar Mahadev Temple, a self-proclaimed Shiva temple located in Tawadbara village in Gaurela Pendra Marwahi district. The town is a destination for holy and beautiful Tirth Amarkantak, and also a beautiful place to enjoy and place is a growing tourist centre in the region.

Gaurela is a quiet, cool and beautiful place to enjoy and stay and is a fast emerging area on the tourism map of Chhattisgarh.

== Geography ==
Gaurella is located on 22°45′21″N 81°54′04″E. Gaurella has an average elevation of 617 metres (2,024 ft).

== Climate ==
Gaurella's monsoon season takes place in July, August, and September. However, the village experiences rain throughout the year, with February being the only month that is normally dry.

Climate data for Gaurella (1991–2020, extremes 1903–2020)
Month	Jan	Feb	Mar	Apr	May	Jun	Jul	Aug	Sep	Oct	Nov	Dec	Year
Record high °C (°F)	33.0 (91.4)	36.0 (96.8)	40.8 (105.4)	43.2 (109.8)	46.2 (115.2)	44.6 (112.3)	38.6 (101.5)	35.2 (95.4)	34.6 (94.3)	36.9 (98.4)	35.5 (95.9)	31.5 (88.7)	46.2 (115.2)
Mean daily maximum °C (°F)	24.8 (76.6)	28.0 (82.4)	32.6 (90.7)	37.1 (98.8)	39.4 (102.9)	35.5 (95.9)	30.1 (86.2)	29.4 (84.9)	30.1 (86.2)	30.4 (86.7)	28.1 (82.6)	25.9 (78.6)	30.9 (87.6)
Mean daily minimum °C (°F)	10.8 (51.4)	13.6 (56.5)	17.8 (64.0)	22.3 (72.1)	25.3 (77.5)	24.6 (76.3)	23.0 (73.4)	22.6 (72.7)	21.9 (71.4)	18.6 (65.5)	14.5 (58.1)	11.0 (51.8)	18.8 (65.8)
Record low °C (°F)	2.5 (36.5)	1.7 (35.1)	8.7 (47.7)	12.4 (54.3)	15.5 (59.9)	16.7 (62.1)	18.1 (64.6)	17.9 (64.2)	15.5 (59.9)	11.5 (52.7)	6.1 (43.0)	3.9 (39.0)	1.7 (35.1)
Average rainfall mm (inches)	28.2 (1.11)	21.8 (0.86)	31.3 (1.23)	27.5 (1.08)	38.7 (1.52)	187.0 (7.36)	312.8 (12.31)	333.2 (13.12)	230.9 (9.09)	61.5 (2.42)	15.2 (0.60)	9.1 (0.36)	1,297.2 (51.07)
Average rainy days	2.0	2.0	2.5	2.2	3.5	10.2	17.0	16.6	11.0	3.7	1.2	0.4	72.3
Average relative humidity (%) (at 17:30 IST)	48	39	32	27	30	55	79	80	76	62	55	49	53
Source: India Meteorological Department

== Demographics ==
As of the 2011 Indian census, Gaurella had a population of 18,165. Males constituted 51% of the population and females 49%. The average literacy rate in the village was 22%, substantially lower than the national average of 59.5%. Male literacy was 29%, and female literacy 14%.

== Transport ==
Pendra Road railway station is major railway station of city, many passenger, express and Superfast trains halt in Pendra.
