= Lucknow–Raipur Garib Rath Express =

Train in India

Lucknow Charbah - Raipur Junction Garib Rath Express
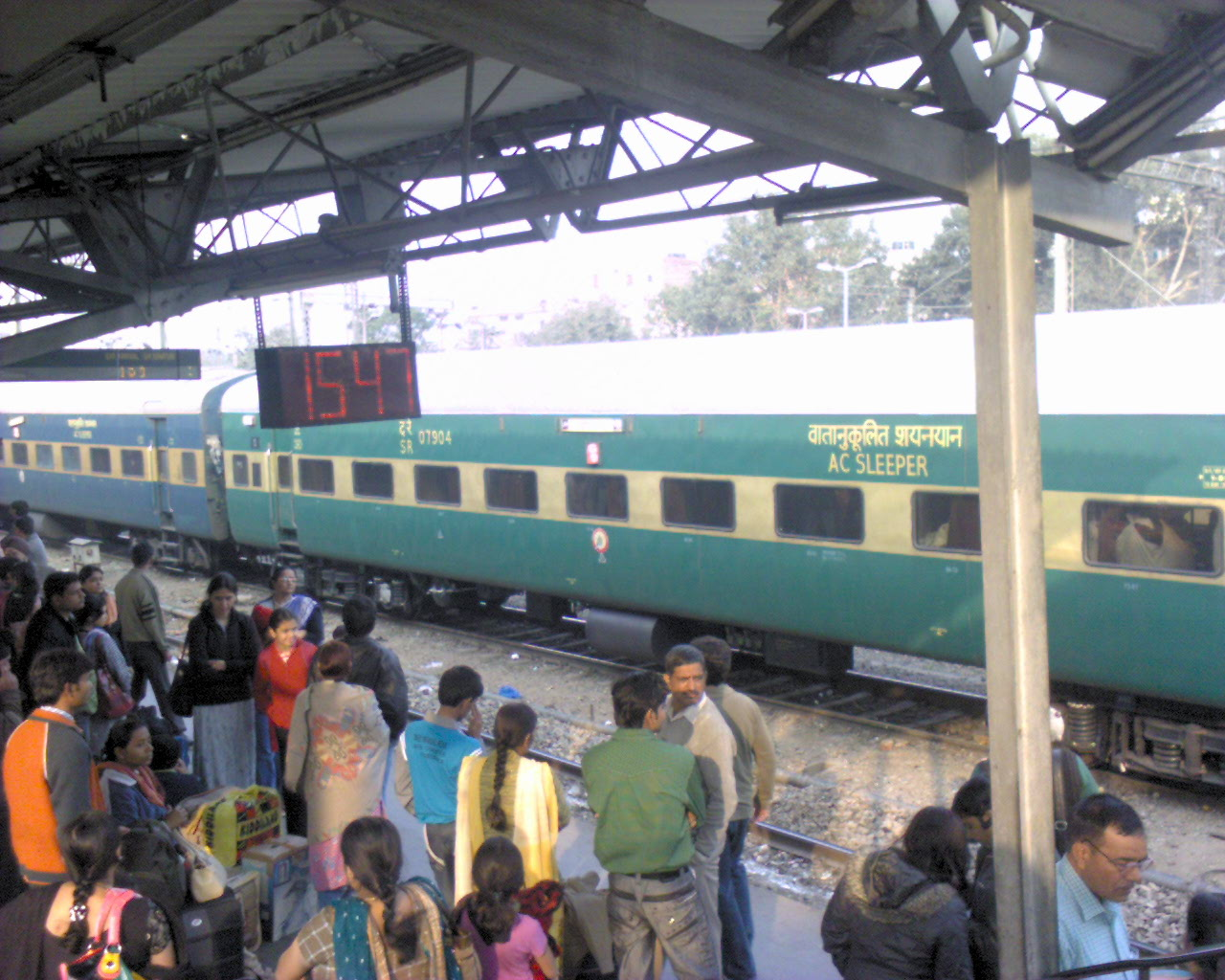
- Garib Rath Express At Katni Junction railway station

Overview
- Service type: Superfast Express, Garib Rath Express
- First service: 23 February 2008
- Current operator: North Eastern Railway zone

Route
- Termini: Lucknow Junction; Raipur Junction
- Stops: 10
- Distance travelled: 919 km (571 mi)
- Average journey time: 16 hours (Approx.)
- Service frequency: Bi-weekly
- Train number: 12535 / 12536

On-board services
- Class: AC 3 tier
- Seating arrangements: No
- Sleeping arrangements: Yes
- Auto-rack arrangements: No
- Catering facilities: No
- Observation facilities: Large Windows

Technical
- Rolling stock: Standard Indian Railways Garib Rath Coaches
- Track gauge: 1,676 mm (5 ft 6 in)
- Operating speed: 55 km/h (34 mph) Avg. with Halts 110 km/h (68 mph) Max.
Route map
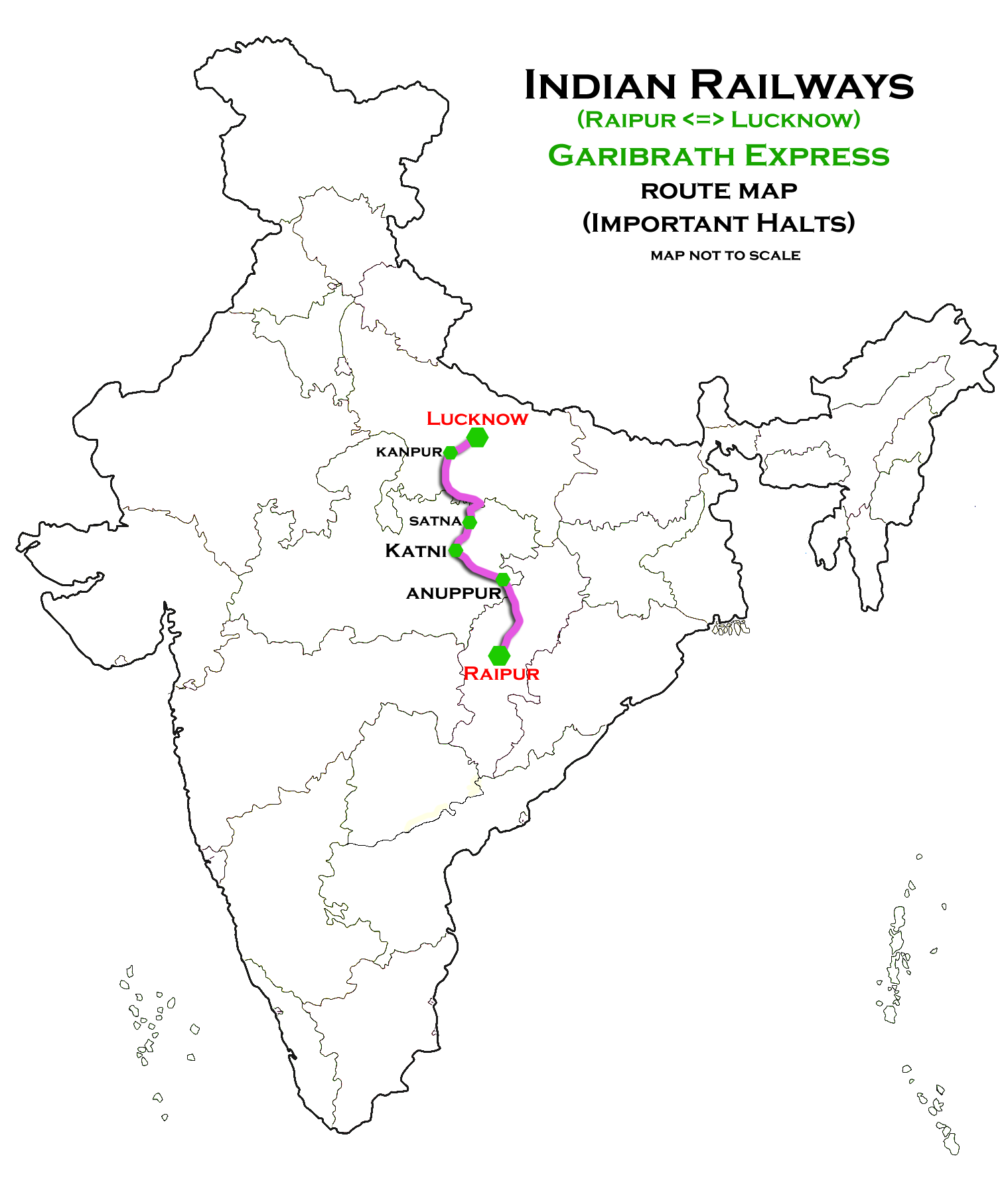

Lucknow Raipur Garib Rath Express is a Superfast Express train of the Garib Rath series belonging to Indian Railways - North Eastern Railway zone that runs between Lucknow NE and Raipur Junction in India.

It operates as train number 12535 from Lucknow NE to Raipur Junction and as train number 12536 in the reverse direction serving the states of Uttar Pradesh, Madhya Pradesh & Chhattisgarh.

== Coaches ==
The train has 10 AC 3 tier & 2 End on Generator Coaches. It does not carry a Pantry car coach.

== Service ==
The service of the train covers a distance of 919 km (571 mi) in 16 hours at an average speed of 55 km/h (34 mph) on both ways.

== Routeing ==
The train traverses through Kanpur Central, Banda, Satna, Katni, Anuppur Junction, Uslapur and Bhatapara

== Traction ==
This train is hauled by a Gorakhpur based WAP 4 or a Gonda based WAP 7 locomotive from Raipur to Lucknow and vice-versa.
