= Valsad–Puri Superfast Express =

Train in India

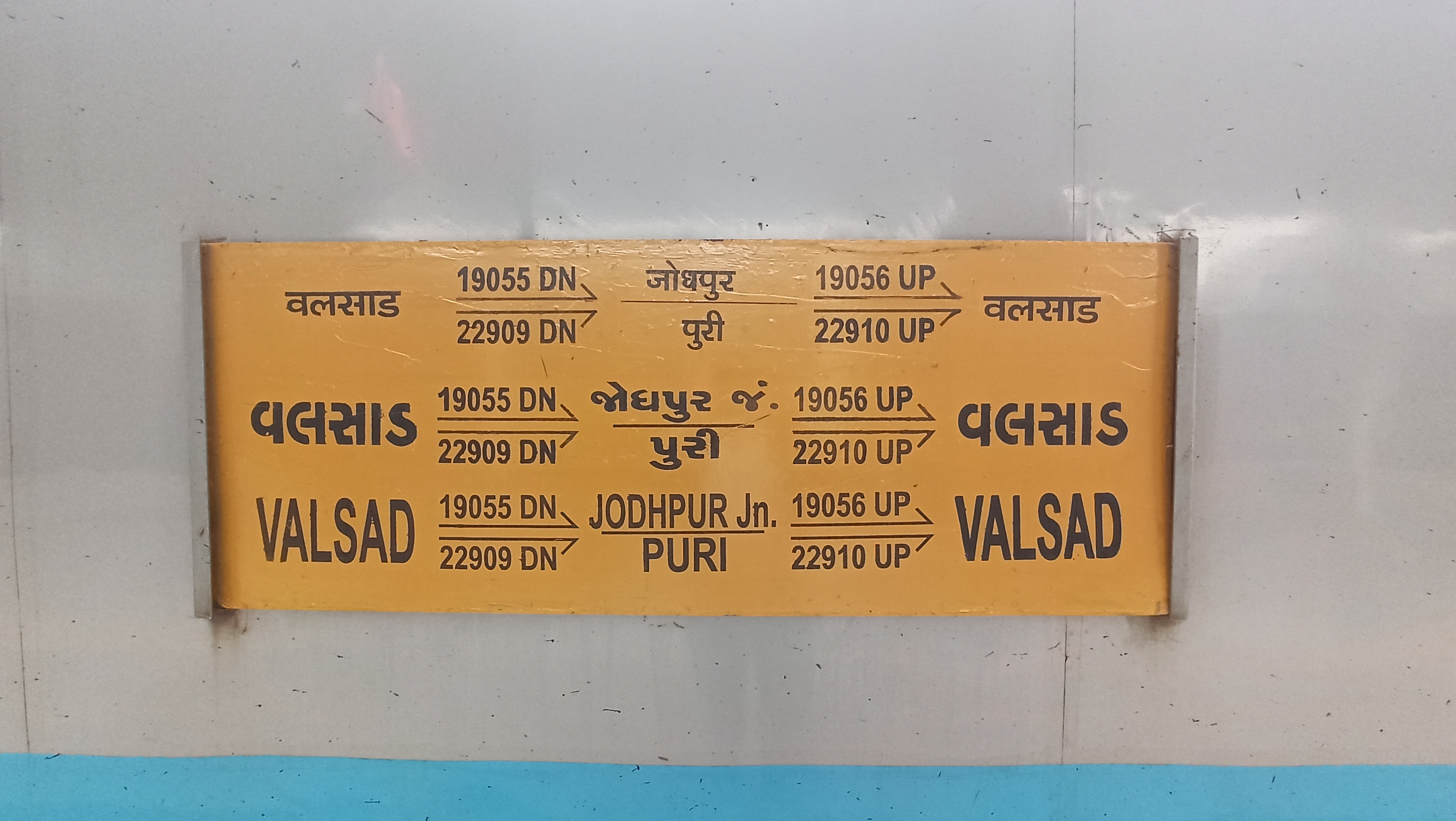

Overview
- Service type: Superfast Express
- First service: 12 February 2011; 15 years ago
- Current operator: Western Railway

Route
- Termini: Valsad (BL); Puri (PURI)
- Stops: 24
- Distance travelled: 2,065 km (1,283 mi)
- Average journey time: 37 hours 15 minutes
- Service frequency: Weekly
- Train number: 22909 / 22910

On-board services
- Classes: AC 2 tier, AC 3 tier, Sleeper Class, General Unreserved
- Seating arrangements: Yes
- Sleeping arrangements: Yes
- Catering facilities: On-board catering, E-catering
- Observation facilities: Large windows
- Baggage facilities: Available
- Other facilities: Below the seats

Technical
- Rolling stock: LHB coach
- Track gauge: 1,676 mm (5 ft 6 in)
- Operating speed: 130 km/h (81 mph) maximum, 55 km/h (34 mph) average including halts.
Route map
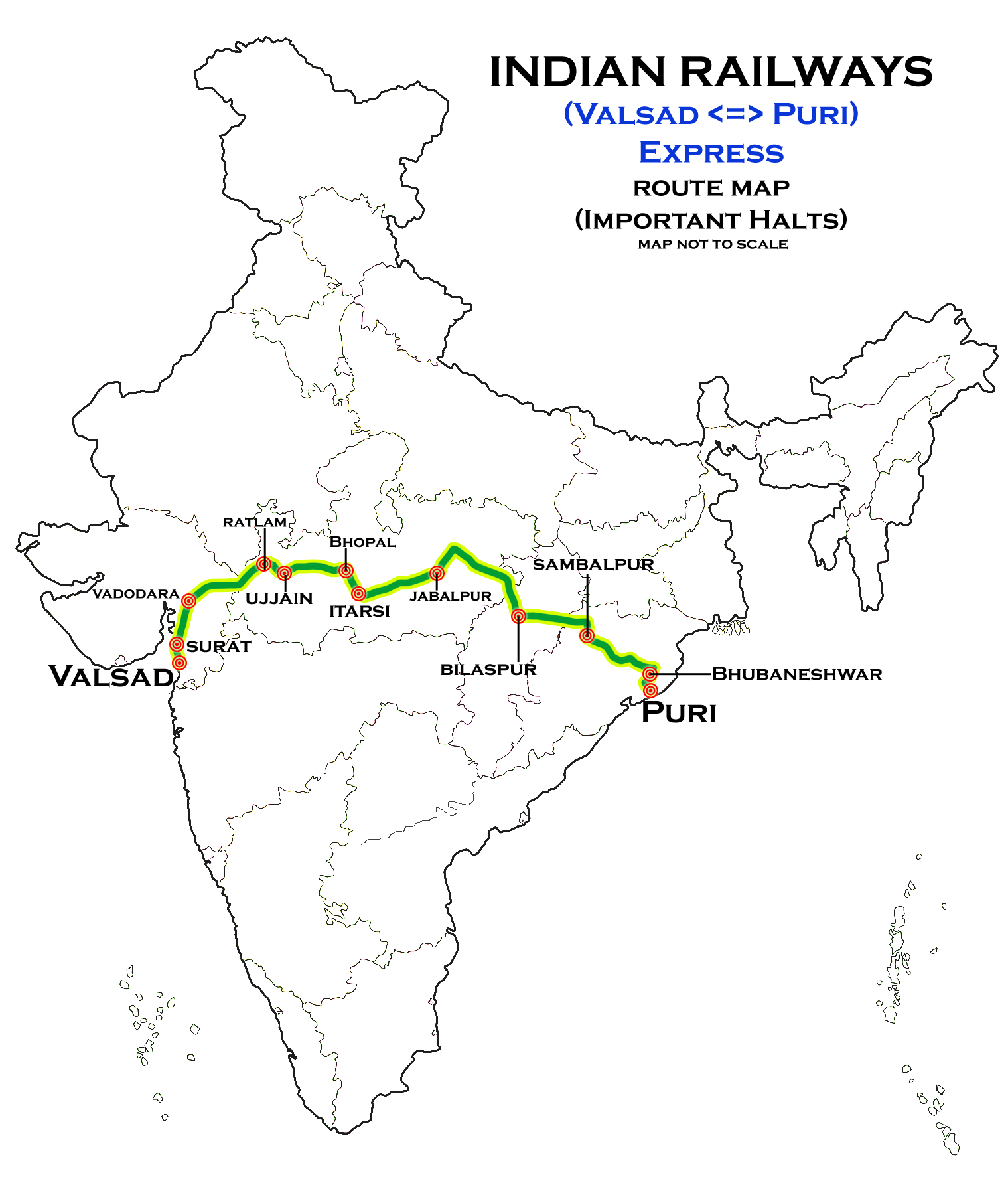

The 22909 / 22910 Valsad–Puri Superfast Express is a Superfast Express train belonging to Indian Railways – Western Railway zone that runs between Valsad and Puri in India.

It operates as train number 22909 from Valsad to Puri and as train number 22910 in the reverse direction serving the states of Gujarat, Madhya Pradesh, Chhattisgarh, and Odisha.

On 24 January 2019, Second upgraded rake of Western Railway under ‘Project Utkrisht’ with beautiful interiors & many passengers friendly new features was introduced in Valsad–Puri Superfast Express.

== Coaches ==
The 22909/22910 Valsad–Puri Superfast Express running with new LHB rake from 28 March 2019 instead of ICF rake which has 2 AC 2 tier, 6 AC 3 tier, 8 Sleeper Class, 4 General Unreserved & 2 EOGs (End On Generation) coaches. It does not carry a pantry car.

As is customary with most train services in India, coach composition may be amended at the discretion of Indian Railways depending on demand.

== Route and halts ==
The important halts of the train are:

- Valsad
- Surat
- Vadodara
- Dahod
- Ratlam Junction
- Ujjain Junction
- Maksi Junction
- Bhopal Junction
- Itarsi Junction
- Pipariya
- Jabalpur Junction
- Katni South
- Shahdol
- Anuppur Junction
- Pendra Road
- Bilaspur
- Champa
- Jharsuguda
- Sambalpur City
- Angul
- Talcher Road
- Dhenkanal
- Bhubaneswar
- Khurda Road
- Puri

== Traction ==
Both trains are hauled by a Vadodara Loco Shed or Itarsi Loco Shed-based WAP-7 electric locomotive on its entire journey.

== Reversals ==
The train reverses its direction two times at;

- Itarsi Junction.

== Schedule ==
Train number	Station code	Departure station	Departure time	Departure day	Arrival station	Arrival time	Arrival day
22909	BL	Valsad	20:10 PM	Thursday	Puri	09:30 AM	Saturday
22910	PURI	Puri	12:30 AM	Sunday	Valsad	12:10 PM	Monday

== Rake sharing ==
The train shares its rake with 19055/19056 Valsad–Jodhpur Weekly Express.
