= Betwa Express =

Train in India

Overview
- Service type: Express
- Locale: Chhattisgarh, Madhya Pradesh & Uttar Pradesh
- First service: 21 October 2004; 21 years ago
- Current operator: South East Central Railway

Route
- Termini: Durg Junction (DURG); Kanpur Central (CNB)
- Stops: 17
- Distance travelled: 877 km (545 mi)
- Average journey time: 17 hours 25 minutes
- Service frequency: Bi-weekly
- Train number: 18203 / 18204

On-board services
- Classes: AC 2 Tier, AC 3 Tier, Sleeper Class, General Unreserved,
- Seating arrangements: Yes
- Sleeping arrangements: Yes
- Catering facilities: On-board catering, E-catering
- Observation facilities: Large windows
- Baggage facilities: No
- Other facilities: Below the seats

Technical
- Rolling stock: LHB coach
- Track gauge: Broad Gauge
- Operating speed: 50 km/h (31 mph) average including halts.

The 18203 / 18204 Betwa Express is an express train of the Indian Railways, which runs between Durg Junction of Durg, an important city in Central Indian state of Chhattisgarh and Kanpur Central of Kanpur, the most populous city of Uttar Pradesh. The name "Betwa Express" has been given after Betwa River. Betwa Express runs twice a week in both directions.

== Coach composition ==
Betwa Express is recently upgraded to LHB coaches. it has 2 unreserved coaches, 12 sleeper coaches, 3 AC Tier III coaches and 2 AC Tier II coach.

== Traction ==
As the route has been electrified, it is hauled by an Ajni Loco Shed or Bhilai Loco Shed-based WAP-7 electric locomotive from Durg to Kanpur Central and vice versa.

== Route & halts ==
The train runs from Durg via Raipur, Bhatapara, Uslapur, Anuppur Junction, Shahdol, Katni Junction, Maihar, Satna, Manikpur Junction, Banda to Kanpur Central.
