= Jabalpur–Bhopal Express via Bina =

Defunct train in India

Jabalpur - Bhopal Overnight Express Via. Bina
Overview
- Service type: Express
- Locale: Madhya Pradesh (Mahakoshal, Satpura, Bundelkhand)
- First service: Jabalpur–Bhopal
- Last service: Cancelled
- Current operator: West Central Railway

Route
- Termini: Jabalpur Junction; Bhopal Junction
- Stops: 10
- Distance travelled: 000 km (0 mi)
- Average journey time: 10 hours approx
- Service frequency: 4 days a week
- Train number: 1473DN / 1474UP

On-board services
- Classes: AC 1, AC 2, AC 3, Sleeper, General, Chair Car, Unreserved
- Seating arrangements: Yes
- Sleeping arrangements: Yes
- Auto-rack arrangements: Not available
- Catering facilities: Yes with good food but no pantry
- Entertainment facilities: Not available
- Baggage facilities: Yes, available
- Other facilities: R.O. Vending machines, Chair car cum sleeper car coaches, Enough general coaches

Technical
- Operating speed: 70 km/h (43 mph) average with halts

Jabalpur–Bhopal Express was a daily overnight Superfast Express train of the Indian Railways, which runs between Jabalpur Junction railway station of Jabalpur, one of the important city & military cantonment hub of Central Indian state Madhya Pradesh and Bhopal Junction, the main railway station in Bhopal, the capital city of Madhya Pradesh.The train is now extended up to Laxmibai Nagar Junction of Indore in[Madhya Pradesh and run as Jabalpur–Indore Overnight Express.

== Number and nomenclature ==
The number allowted for the train is :

- 1473 - From Bhopal to Jabalpur
- 1474 - From Jabalpur to Bhopal

== Arrival and departure ==
The train is now cancelled and is no more operational.

== Routes and halts ==
The train was going via Bina Junction. The important halt of the train were Katni, Damoh, Sagar, Khurai, Bina and Vidisha.

== Locomotive ==
The train was hauled by ET WDM-3 diesel locomotive of the Itarsi Shed.

== Coach composite ==
The train was consisting of 19 coaches as follow :

- 1 AC I Tier
- 2 AC II Tier
- 2 AC III Tier
- 10 Sleeper class
- 3 General
- 1 Luggage/brake van
