= Durg–Ajmer Express =

Train in India

The Ajmer–Durg Express or Durg Express is a weekly Express train connecting Ajmer, the major city of Rajasthan and Durg, a town in Chhattisgarh. The train totally covers the most of almost half portion of Madhya Pradesh from West Central to East.

== Number and nomenclature ==
The number provided for the train are:

- 18207 Ajmer–Durg Weekly Express
- 18208 Ajmer–Durg Weekly Express
- 18213 Ajmer–Durg Weekly Express
- 18214 Ajmer–Durg Weekly Express

== Route ==
- Ajmer Junction
- Jaipur Junction
- Sawai Madhopur Junction
- Kota Junction
- Guna Junction
- Sagar
- Katni Murwara Junction
- Shahdol
- Anuppur Junction
- Uslapur
- Raipur Junction
- Durg Junction

== Coach composition ==
This train runs with I lhb coach.

- SLRD eog Class – 2
- Sleeper class – 12
- Second Class (unreserved) – 2
- AC 3 Tier – 3
- AC 2 Tier – 2 ha1 1

== Speed and frequency ==
The train runs on a weekly basis with average speed 60 km/h.
