= Bikaner–Puri Express =

Train in India

Shri Ganganagar-Puri Express

Overview
- Service type: Superfast
- First service: 28 April 2013; 12 years ago
- Current operator: North Western Railway

Route
- Termini: Shri Ganganagar Junction (SGNR); Puri (PURI)
- Stops: 37
- Distance travelled: 2,407 km (1,496 mi)
- Average journey time: 43 hrs 20 mins
- Service frequency: Weekly
- Train number: 20471 / 20472

On-board services
- Classes: AC 2 Tier, AC 3 Tier, Sleeper Class, General Unreserved
- Seating arrangements: No
- Sleeping arrangements: Yes
- Catering facilities: E-catering, On-board Catering
- Observation facilities: Large windows
- Baggage facilities: No
- Other facilities: Below the seats

Technical
- Rolling stock: LHB coach
- Track gauge: 1,676 mm (5 ft 6 in)
- Operating speed: 56 km/h (35 mph) average including halts.

The 20471 / 20472 Shri Ganganagar-Puri Express is a superfast express train of the Indian Railways connecting Shri Ganganagar in Rajasthan and Puri in Odisha. It is currently being operated with 20471/20472 train numbers on a weekly basis.

== Service ==
- 20471 Shri Ganganagar - Puri Express has an average speed of 56 km/h and covers 2407 km in 43 hrs 20 mins.
- 20472 Puri - Shri Ganganagar Express has an average speed of 55 km/h and covers 2407 km in 43 hrs 50 mins.

== Route and halts ==
The important halts of the train are :

- Shri Ganganagar Junction
- Suratgarh Junction
- Bikaner Junction
- Nagaur
- Jaipur Junction
- Durgapura
- Sawai Madhopur Junction
- Kota Junction
- Guna Junction
- Katni Murwara
- Anuppur Junction
- Bilaspur Junction
- Jharsuguda Junction
- Sambalpur Junction
- Bhubaneswar
- Khurda Road Junction
- Puri

== Traction ==
As the route is fully electrified, it is hauled by a Visakhapatnam Loco Shed-based WAP-7 electric locomotive From Shri Ganganagar to Puri and vice versa.

== Coach composite ==
The train consists of 20 LHB coaches:

- 1 AC II Tier
- 6 AC III Tier
- 2 AC III Tier Economy
- 5 Sleeper Coaches
- 4 General
- 2 SLR cum EoG/parcel van

== Direction reversal ==
Train Reverses its direction twice at:

- Sawai Madhopur Junction
- Sambalpur Junction

== See also ==
- Bilaspur - Bikaner Express
