= Durg–Jammu Tawi Express =

Train in India

Durg–MCTM Udhampur Express
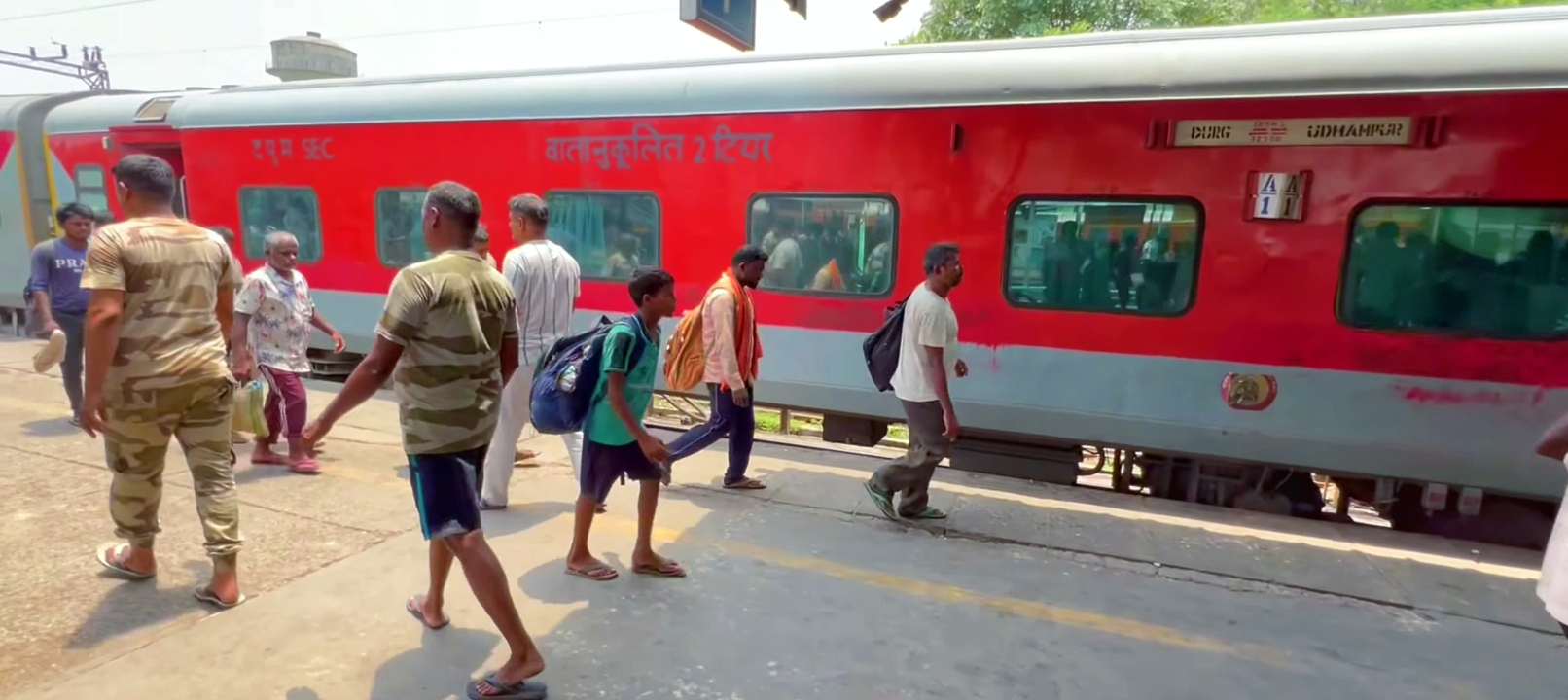
- Durg - MCTM Udhampur Express At Ambala Cantt.

Overview
- Service type: Superfast
- First service: 12 February 2014; 12 years ago
- Current operator: South East Central Railway

Route
- Termini: Durg Junction (DURG); MCTM Udhampur (MCTM)
- Stops: 22
- Distance travelled: 1,911 km (1,187 mi)
- Average journey time: 32 hours 25 minutes
- Service frequency: Weekly (Note: Runs one day in a week for every direction.)
- Train number: 20847 / 20848

On-board services
- Classes: AC 2 Tier, AC 3 Tier, Sleeper Class, General Unreserved
- Seating arrangements: Yes
- Sleeping arrangements: Yes
- Catering facilities: On-board catering, E-catering
- Observation facilities: Large windows
- Baggage facilities: No
- Other facilities: Below the seats

Technical
- Rolling stock: LHB coach
- Track gauge: 1,676 mm (5 ft 6 in)
- Operating speed: 59 km/h (37 mph) average including halts.

The 20847 / 20848 Durg–MCTM Udhampur Express is an Express train belonging to South East Central Railway zone that runs between Durg Junction and Martyr Captain Tushar Mahajan Udhampur in India. It is currently being operated with 20847/20848 train numbers on a weekly basis.

== Service ==
The 20847/Durg–MCTM Udhampur Express has an average speed of 58 km/h and covers 1911 km in 32h 45m. The 20848/MCTM Udhampur–Durg Express has an average speed of 59 km/h and covers 1911 km in 32h 25m.

== Route and halts ==
The important halts of the train are:

- Durg Junction
- Raipur Junction
- Uslapur
- Anuppur Junction
- Katni Murwara
- Saugor
- Jhansi Junction
- Gwalior Junction
- Agra Cantonment
- New Delhi
- Ambala Cantonment Junction
- Jalandhar City Junction
- Amritsar Junction
- Gurdaspur
- Pathankot Junction
- Jammu Tawi
- MCTM Udhampur

== Coach composition ==
The train has LHB rakes with a maximum speed of 130 km/h. The train consists of 22 coaches :

- 1 First AC
- 2 AC II Tier
- 2 AC III Tier
- 9 Sleeper Coaches
- 6 General Unreserved
- 2 Seating cum Luggage Rake

== Traction ==
Both trains are hauled by a Ludhiana Loco Shed or Ajni Loco Shed-based WAP-7 electric locomotive from Durg to MCTM Udhampur and vice versa.

== Rake sharing ==
The train shares its rake with 18213/18214 Durg-Ajmer Weekly Express.

== See also ==
- Durg Junction railway station
- Jammu Tawi railway station
- Durg–Jaipur Weekly Express
