= Narmada Express =

Train in India

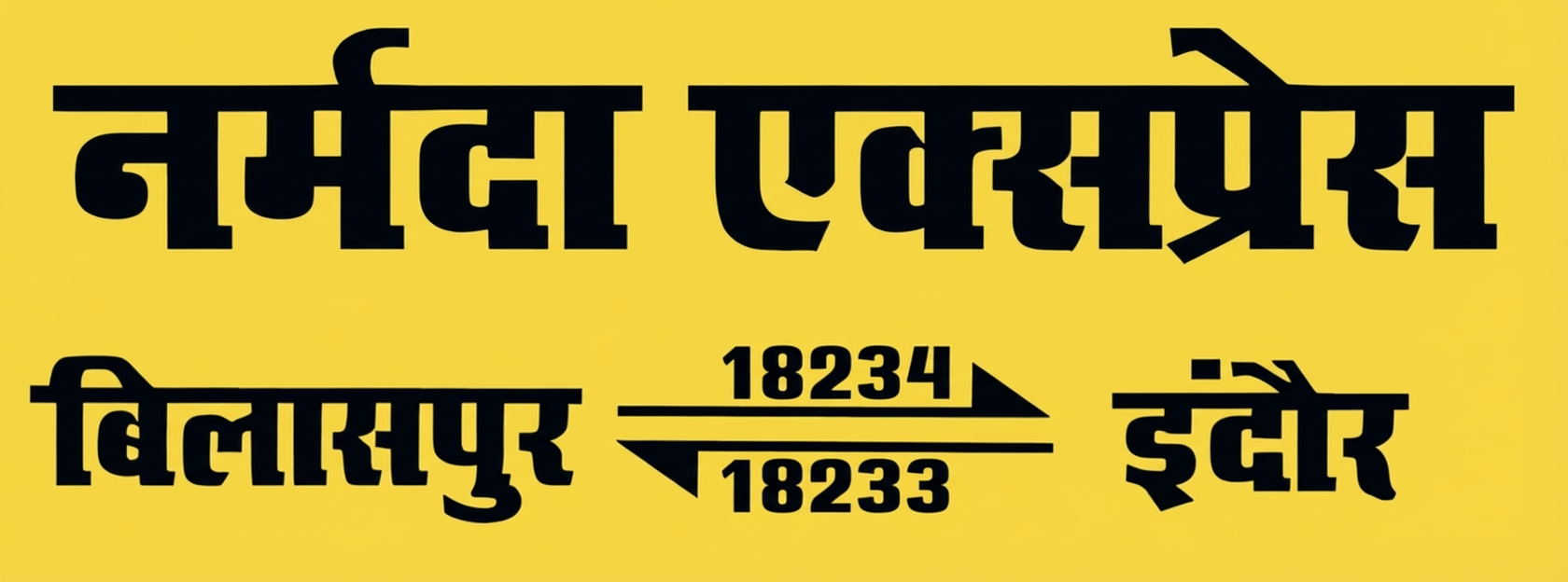
- Train board of Narmada Express.

Overview
- Service type: Express
- Locale: Madhya Pradesh & Chhattisgarh
- First service: 1 November 1957; 68 years ago
- Current operator: South East Central Railway

Route
- Termini: Indore Junction (INDB); Bilaspur Junction (BSP)
- Stops: 49
- Distance travelled: 1,007 km (626 mi)
- Average journey time: 21 hrs 30 mins
- Service frequency: Daily
- Train number: 18233 / 18234

On-board services
- Classes: AC First Class, AC 2 Tier, AC 3 Tier, Sleeper Class, General Unreserved
- Seating arrangements: Yes
- Sleeping arrangements: Yes
- Catering facilities: On-board catering, E-catering
- Observation facilities: Large windows
- Baggage facilities: No
- Other facilities: Below the seats

Technical
- Rolling stock: ICF coach (LHB coach from 30 March 2026)
- Track gauge: 1,676 mm (5 ft 6 in) broad gauge
- Operating speed: 47 km/h (29 mph) average including halts.
Route map
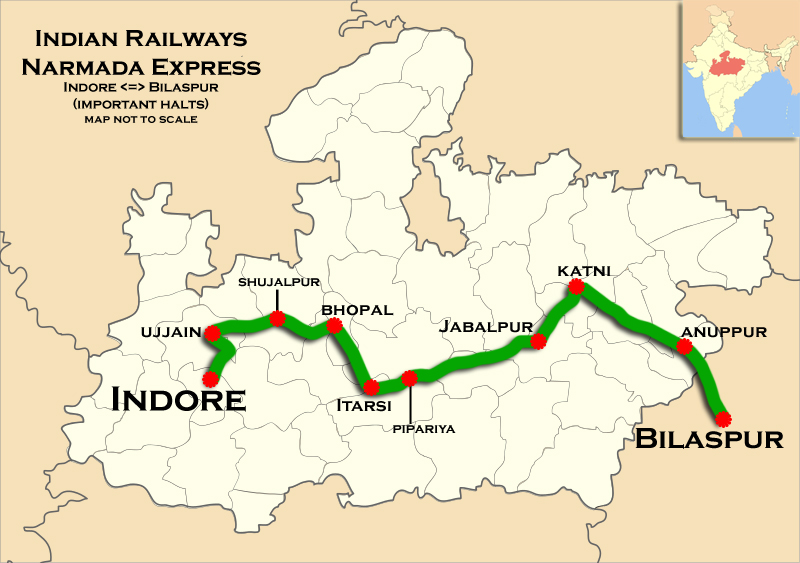

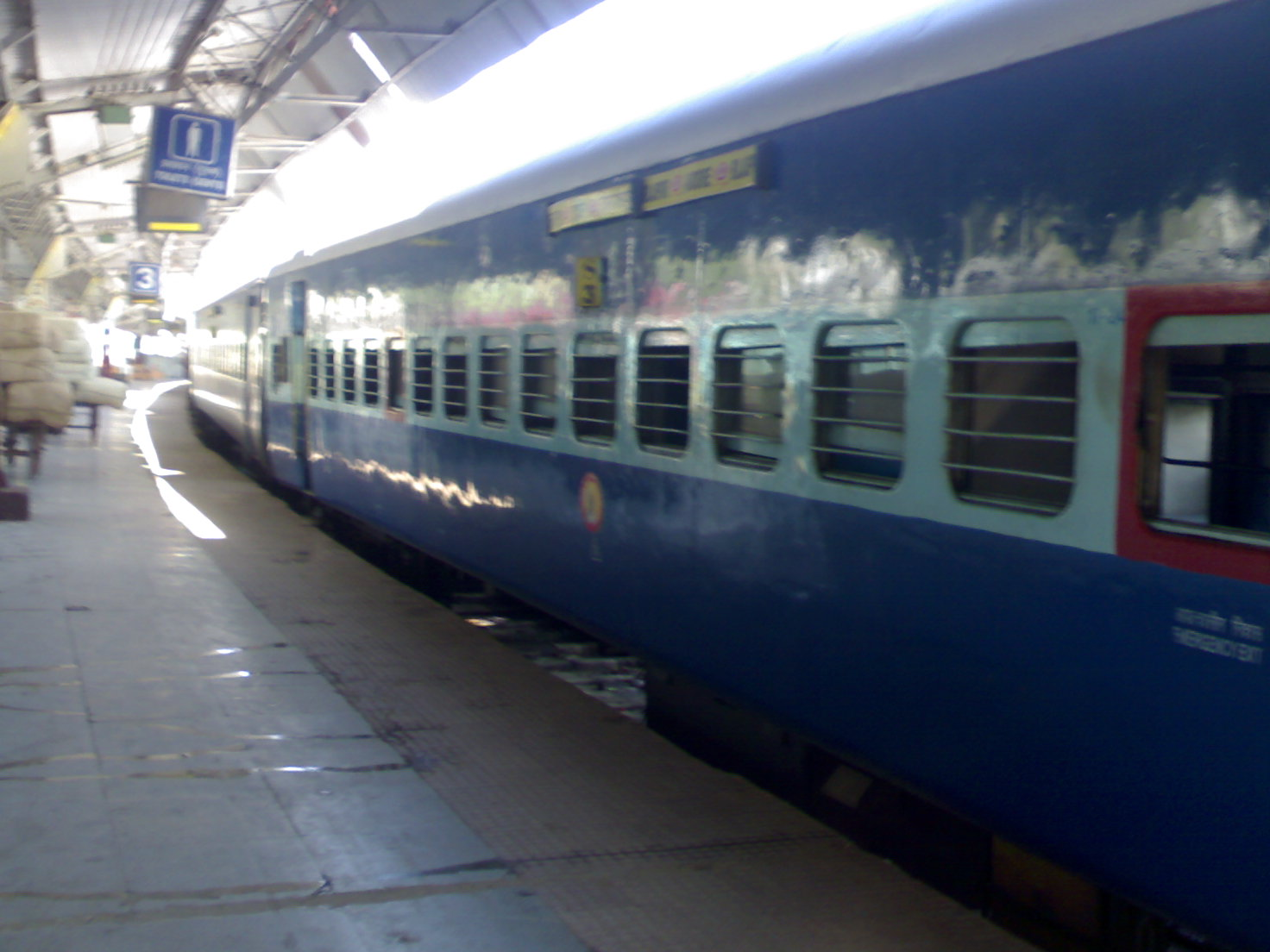
Another view of departure of Narmada Express

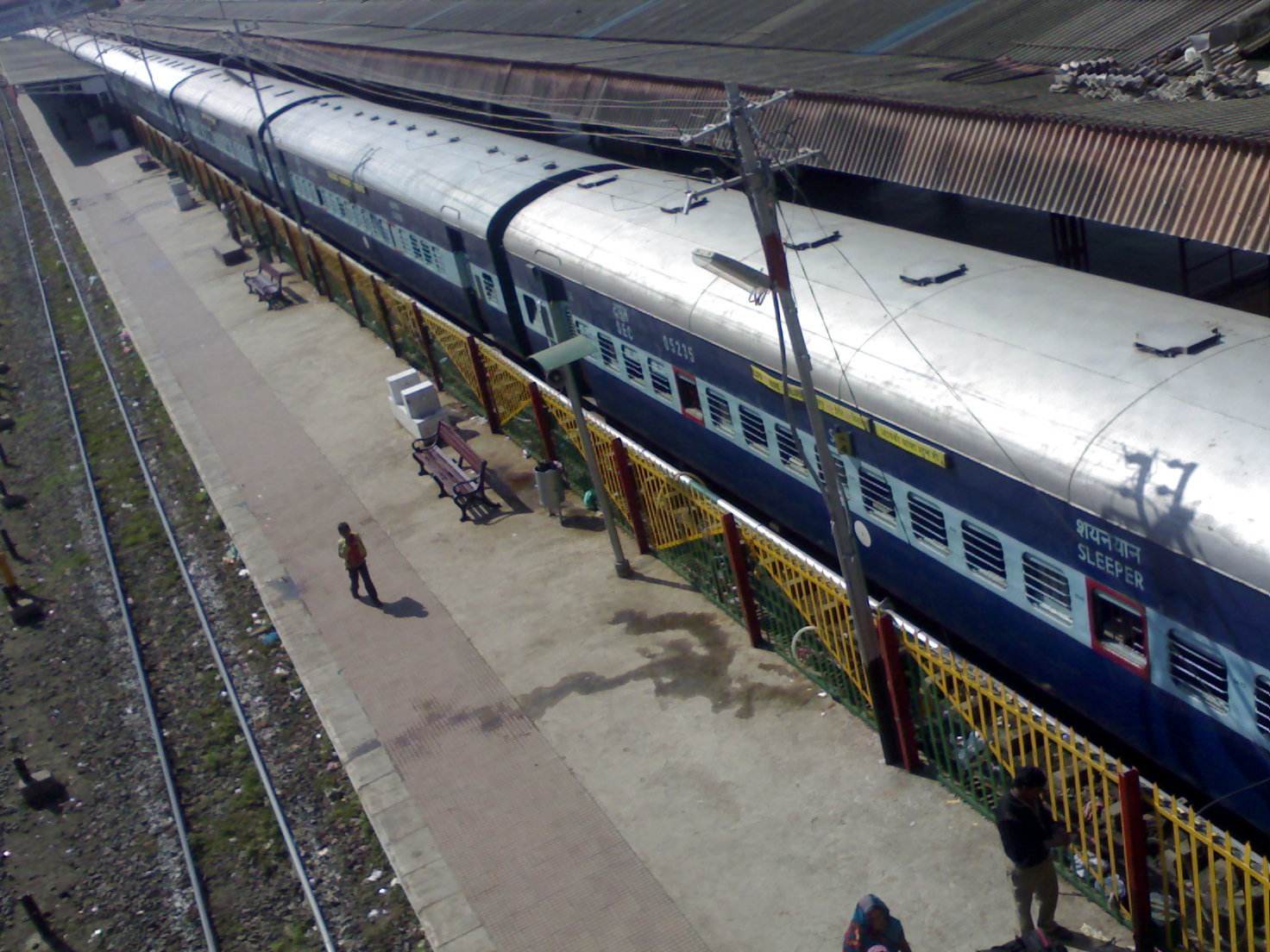
Narmada Express departing from Indore

The 18233 / 18234 Narmada Express is a daily express train which runs between Indore city of Madhya Pradesh and Bilaspur city of Chhattisgarh.

The name 'Narmada' signifies the largest river of Central India, Narmada River. As the train crosses holy river Narmada, the longest and most important river in Madhya Pradesh, so is named as Narmada Express.

== Coach composition ==
The train consists of 22 coaches:

- 1 AC First Class cum AC II Tier
- 1 AC II Tier
- 4 AC III Tier
- 11 Sleeper Class
- 3 General Unreserved
- 2 Seating cum Luggage Rake

== Service ==
The 18233/Narmada Express has an average speed of 42 km/h and covers 1007 km in 24 hrs 00 mins.

The 18234/Narmada Express has an average speed of 42 km/h and covers 1007 km in 24 hrs 10 mins.

== Route & halts ==
The important halts of the train are:

- Indore Junction
- Dewas Junction
- Ujjain Junction
- Maksi Junction
- Shujalpur
- Sehore
- Sant Hirdaram Nagar
- Bhopal Junction
- Rani Kamalapati
- Narmadapuram
- Itarsi Junction
- Pipariya
- Gadarwara
- Narsinghpur
- Madan Mahal
- Jabalpur Junction
- Katni South
- Shahdol
- Anuppur Junction
- Pendra Road
- Uslapur
- Bilaspur Junction

== Schedule ==
Train number	Station code	Departure station	Departure time	Departure day	Arrival station	Arrival time	Arrival day
18233	INDB	Indore Junction	17:15 PM	Daily	Bilaspur Junction	17:15 PM	Daily
18234	BSP	Bilaspur Junction	10:40 AM	Daily	Indore Junction	10:50 AM	Daily

== Direction reversal ==
Train reverses its direction at:

- Ujjain Junction
- Itarsi Junction

== Traction ==
Both trains are hauled by an Itarsi Loco Shed-based WAP-7 electric locomotive from Indore to Bilaspur and vice versa.

== See also ==
- Bhopal–Bilaspur Express
