= Durg–Nautanwa Express (via Varanasi) =

Passenger train in India

Durg-Nautanwa Express
Overview
- Service type: Express
- First service: 21 November 2003; 22 years ago
- Current operator: South East Central Railway

Route
- Termini: Durg (DURG); Nautanwa (NTV)
- Stops: 22
- Distance travelled: 1,224 km (761 mi)
- Average journey time: 26 hours 50 minutes
- Service frequency: Bi-weekly
- Train number: 18201 / 18202

On-board services
- Classes: AC 2 tier, AC 3 tier, Sleeper class, General Unreserved
- Seating arrangements: Yes
- Sleeping arrangements: Yes
- Catering facilities: On-board catering, E-catering
- Observation facilities: Large windows
- Baggage facilities: No
- Other facilities: Below the seats

Technical
- Rolling stock: LHB coach
- Track gauge: 1,676 mm (5 ft 6 in)
- Operating speed: 51 km/h (32 mph) average including halts.

The 18201 / 18202 Durg-Nautanwa Express is an express train belonging to South East Central Railway zone of Indian Railways that run between Durg and Nautanwa in India. It operates as train number 18201 from Durg to Nautanwa and as train number 18202 in the reverse direction.

== Coach composition ==
Loco	1	2	3	4	5	6	7	8					
Loco	HA1	A1	B1	B2	B3	B4	S5	S4	S3	S2	S1	GEN	SLR

== Journey ==
It takes around 26 hours 50 minutes to cover its journey of 1,224 kilometres (761 mi) with an average speed of 60 kilometres per hour (37 mph).

== See also ==
- Mau–Anand Vihar Terminal Express
- Shalimar (Howrah) Express
- Pune–Gorakhpur Express
