= Durg Junction railway station =

Railway station in Chhattisgarh

DURG JUNCTION

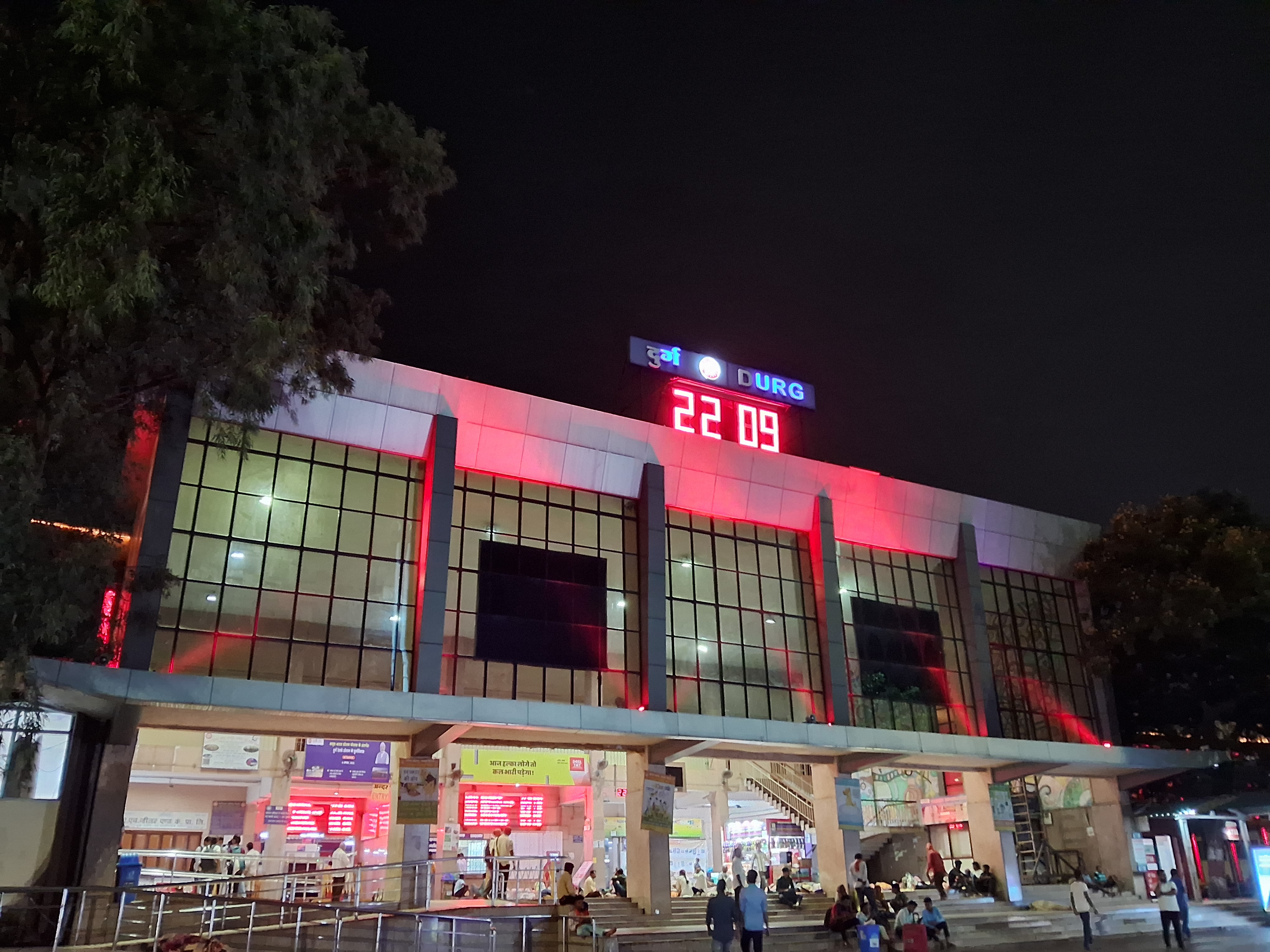
- Durg Junction Railway Station building

General information
- Location: Durg, Chhattisgarh; India
- Coordinates: 21°11′59″N 81°17′30″E
- Elevation: 290 m (951 ft)
- System: Express train and Passenger train station
- Owner: Indian Railways
- Operator: South East Central Railway Zone (India)
- Lines: Bilaspur–Nagpur section of Howrah–Nagpur–Mumbai line, Durg–Dallirajhara line(junction point)
- Platforms: 6 (5 + 1Terminal)
- Tracks: 8 5 ft 6 in (1,676 mm) broad gauge

Construction
- Structure type: Standard (on ground station)
- Parking: Available

Other information
- Status: Functioning
- Station code: DURG
- Zone(s): South East Central Railway
- Division(s): Raipur

History
- Opened: 1891; 135 years ago
- Electrified: 1970–71
- Former names: Bengal Nagpur Railway
Location
- Location within India Location within Chhattisgarh Location within India
- Interactive map of Durg Junction

Durg Junction Railway Station, is a junction station located in the Indian state of Chhattisgarh. It serves Durg, Bhilai and adjoining areas. Durg Junction is the part of South East Central Railway. It is one of the largest railway junctions of Chhattisgarh in terms of network and a prominent station in the Howrah–Nagpur–Mumbai line. It is an 'A' grade station of Indian Railways in terms of passenger services.

== History ==
Durg railway station started its functioning in 1891. Initially, Durg was the part of Bengal Nagpur Railway. The Nagpur–Asansol main line of Bengal Nagpur Railway which came up in 1891 covered Durg station for the first time. The cross-country Howrah–Nagpur–Mumbai line, opened in 1890, Is the second longest and one of the most important routes in India which passes through Durg railway station.

Bhilai Steel Plant, inaugurated on 4 February 1959, enhanced the importance of Durg railway station as passenger movement through here boosted a lot.

== Railway reorganization ==
The Bengal Nagpur Railway was nationalized in 1944. Eastern Railway was formed on 14 April 1952 with the portion of East Indian Railway Company east of Mughalsarai and the Bengal Nagpur Railway. In 1955, South Eastern Railway was carved out of Eastern Railway. It comprised lines mostly operated by BNR earlier. Amongst the new zones started in April 2003 were East Coast Railway and South East Central Railway. Both these railways were carved out of South Eastern Railway. Now it is the part of South East Central Railway in Raipur Junction Division. Now almost 120 trains pass from here and 45 trains originate and terminate from Durg Junction

== Electrification ==
The Bilaspur–Bhilai and Bhilai–Durg sections were electrified in 1944–45. The Durg Junction railway station got completely electrified by June 1945, Durg–Paniajob section in 1970–71. The Paniajob–Gondia and Gondia–Bhandara Road sections in 1971–72, Bhandara Road–Tharsa and Tharsa–Nagpur sections in 1989–90.

Preceding station	Indian Railways	Following station
Bhilai Nagar towards ?	South East Central Railway zone Tatanagar–Bilaspur section of Howrah–Nagpur–Mumbai line	Murhipar towards ?
