= Shivnath Express =

Train in India

Overview
- Service type: Express
- First service: 15 July 2005; 20 years ago
- Current operator: South East Central Railway

Route
- Termini: Korba (KRBA); NSCB Itwari Junction (NITR)
- Stops: 27
- Distance travelled: 499 km (310 mi)
- Average journey time: 9hrs 55mins
- Service frequency: Daily
- Train number: 18239 / 18240

On-board services
- Classes: AC First, AC 2 tier, AC 3 tier, Sleeper Class, General Unreserved
- Seating arrangements: Yes
- Sleeping arrangements: Yes
- Catering facilities: On-board catering E-catering
- Observation facilities: Large windows
- Baggage facilities: No
- Other facilities: Below the seats

Technical
- Rolling stock: LHB coach
- Track gauge: 1,676 mm (5 ft 6 in)
- Operating speed: 49 km/h (30 mph) average including halts

The 18239 / 18240 Shivnath Express is an express train belonging to South East Central Railway Zone that runs between Gevra Road and Netaji Shubhash Chandra Bose Itwari Junction in India. It is currently being operated with 18239/18240 train numbers on a daily basis.

== Service ==
The 18239/Shivnath Express has an average speed of 44 km/h and covers 505 km in 10h 25m. The 18240/Shivnath Express has an average speed of 55 km/h and covers 498 km from Netaji Shubhash Chandra Bose Itwari Junction to Korba in 9h 00m.

After COVID-19 Pendamic Lockdown restoration, 18239-Shivnath Express is partially cancelled between Gevra Road & Korba . Since then its source station is Korba.

After 18 Years of Initial run, South East Central Railway Zone decided to extend 18240 Shivnath Express from Bilaspur Junction and terminate at Korba from 28-September 2023 onwards.

On 12-March-2024, 18240 NITR-KRBA Shivnath Exp got LHB coach Upgradation.

== Route and halts ==
The important halts of the train are:

- Korba
- Champa Junction
- Bilaspur Junction
- Bhatapara
- Raipur Junction
- Bhilai
- Bhilai Power House
- Durg Junction
- Rajnandgaon
- Dongargarh
- Gondia Junction
- Tumsar Road Junction
- Bhandara Road
- Netaji Shubhash Chandra Bose Itwari Junction

== Coach composition ==
The train has standard LHB coach rakes with a max speed of 130 kmph. The train consists of 20 coaches:

- 1 First AC Cum AC II Tier
- 4 AC III Tier
- 11 Sleeper Coach
- 3 General Unreserved
- 2 Seating cum Luggage Rake

== Traction ==
It is hauled by a Bhilai Loco Shed based WAP-7 electric locomotive from end to end.

== Rake sharing ==
The train shares its rake with 12855/12856 Bilaspur–Netaji Subhash Chandra Bose Itwari Intercity SF Express.

== See also ==
- Gevra Road railway station
- Netaji Shubhash Chandra Bose Itwari Junction
