= Shalimar–Lokmanya Tilak Terminus Express =

Indian train service

Overview
- Service type: Express
- Locale: Maharashtra, Chhattisgarh, Orissa, Jharkhand, West Bengal
- First service: 01 April 1926
- Current operator: South Eastern Railways

Route
- Termini: Shalimar (SHM); Mumbai LTT (LTT)
- Stops: 61 as 18029, 60 as 18030
- Distance travelled: 1,950 km (1,212 mi) as 18029, 1,951 km (1,212 mi) as 18030
- Average journey time: 37 hours 35 minutes as 18029, 36 hours 30 minutes as 18030
- Service frequency: Daily
- Train number: 18029 / 18030

On-board services
- Classes: AC 2 tier, AC 3 tier, Sleeper Class, General Unreserved
- Seating arrangements: Yes
- Sleeping arrangements: Yes
- Catering facilities: Available but no pantry car
- Observation facilities: No rake sharing

Technical
- Rolling stock: LHB coach(19th Jun 2025)
- Track gauge: 1,676 mm (5 ft 6 in)
- Operating speed: 110 km/h (68 mph) maximum 51.22 km/h (32 mph), including halts

The 18029/18030 Shalimar–Lokmanya Tilak Terminus Express is an express train belonging to Indian Railways that runs between Shalimar (Kolkata) and Lokmanya Tilak Terminus (Mumbai) in India.

It operates as train number 18029 from Lokmanya Tilak Terminus to Shalimar (Kolkata) and as train number 18030 in the reverse direction.

== Coaches ==
The 18029/18030 Shalimar Lokmanya Tilak Terminus Express presently has 2 AC 2 tier, 6 AC 3 tier, 8 Sleeper Class & 2 General Unreserved coaches. In addition, it carries up to 4 High Capacity Parcel Vans.

As with most train services in India, coach composition may be amended at the discretion of Indian Railways depending on demand.

== Service ==
The 18029 Lokmanya Tilak Terminus Shalimar Express covers the distance of 1950 kilometres in 38 hours 20 mins (50.87 km/h) and 1951 kilometres in 37 hours 50 mins (51.57 km/h) as 18030 Shalimar Lokmanya Tilak Terminus Express.

As the average speed of the train is below 55 km/h, as per Indian Railways rules, its fare does not include a Superfast surcharge.

== Gallery ==
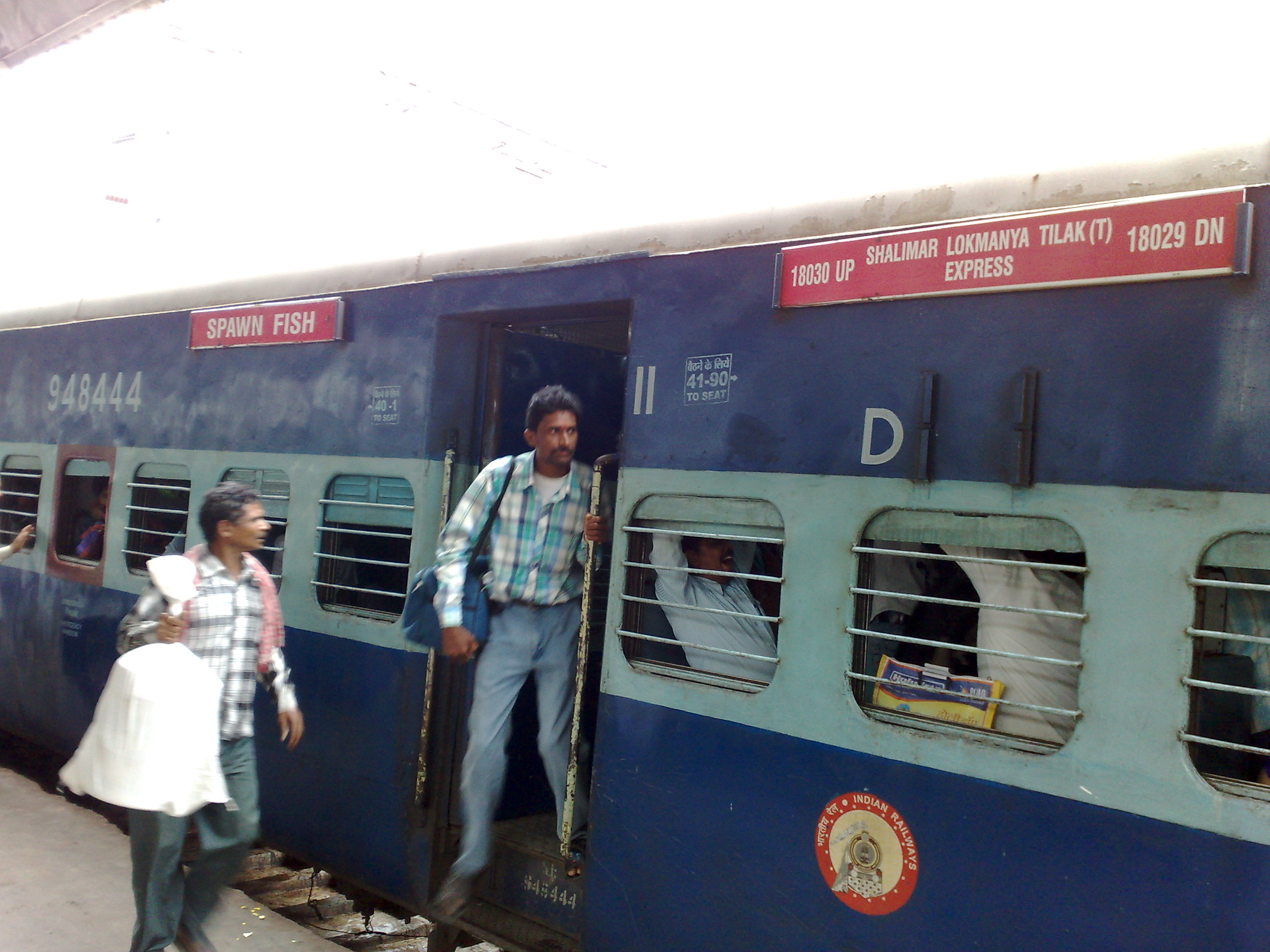
18029 Lokmanya Tilak Terminus Shalimar Express – Fishy coach

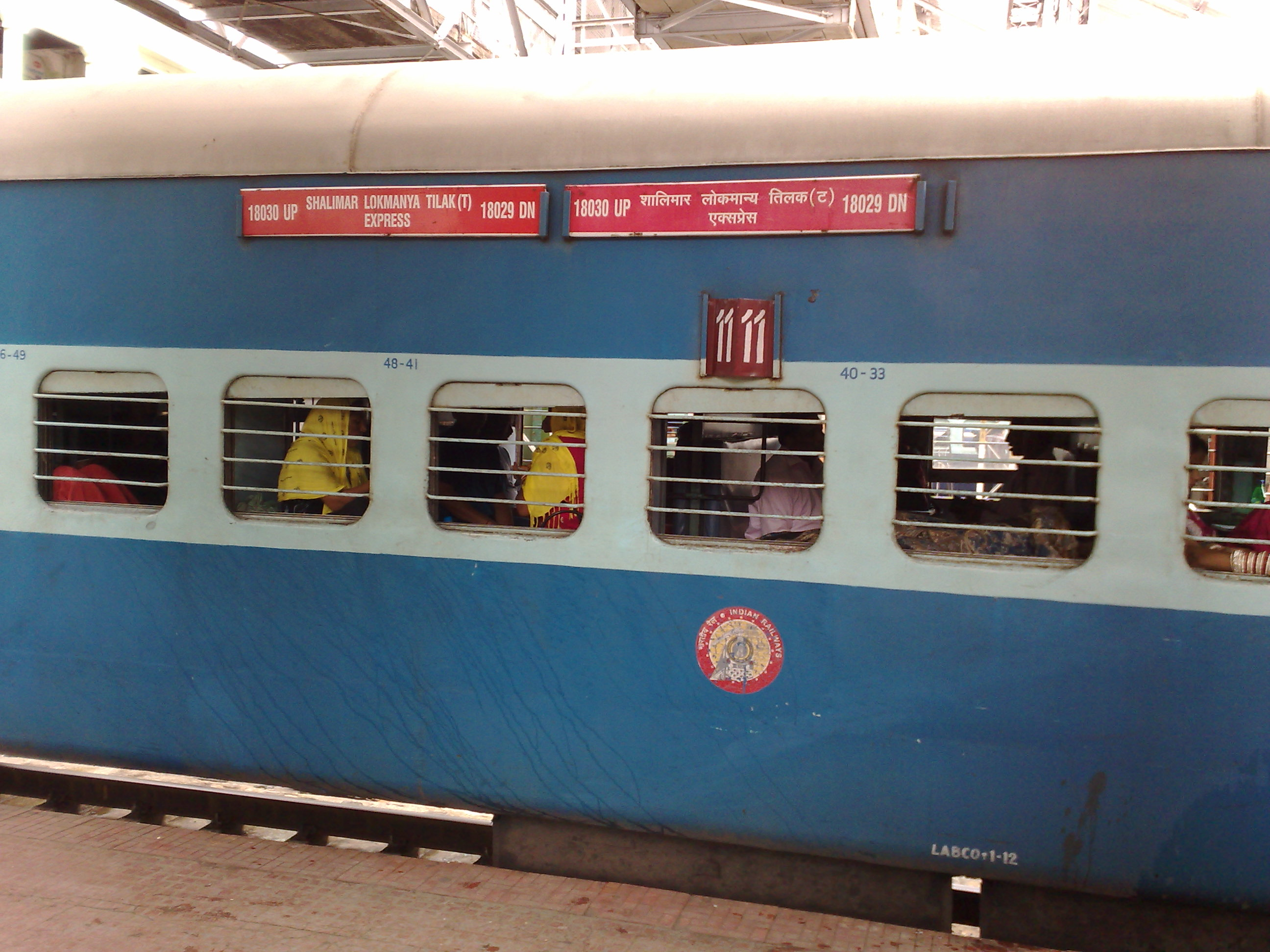
18029 Lokmanya Tilak Terminus Shalimar Express – Sleeper coach

== Traction ==
Prior to DC–AC conversion, 2 locomotives would haul the train. A WCAM 3 from the Kalyan shed hauls the train between Lokmanya Tilak Terminus & Igatpuri after which a Howrah-based WAP-4 takes over for the remainder of the journey.

With Central Railway progressively moving towards a complete changeover from DC to AC traction, it has recently started being hauled end to end by a Santragachi-based WAP-4 locomotive.

== Time table ==
18029 Lokmanya Tilak Terminus Shalimar Express leaves Lokmanya Tilak Terminus on a daily basis at 22:00 hrs IST and reaches Kolkata Shalimar at 11:35 hrs IST on the 3rd day.

18030 Shalimar Lokmanya Tilak Terminus Express leaves Kolkata Shalimar on a daily basis at 15:35 hrs IST and reaches Lokmanya Tilak Terminus at 04:05 hrs IST on the 3rd day.

Station Code	Station Name	18029 – Lokmanya Tilak Terminus to Kolkata Shalimar		Distance from Source in km	Day	18030 – Kolkata Shalimar to Lokmanya Tilak Terminus		Distance from Source in km	Day
Station Code	Station Name	Arrival	Departure	Distance from Source in km	Day	Arrival	Departure	Distance from Source in km	Day
LTT	Lokmanya Tilak Terminus	Source	22:00	0	1	04:05	Destination	1944	3
TNA	Thane	22:22	22:25	16	1	03:23	03:25	1927	3
KYN	Kalyan Junction	22:47	22:50	34	1	03:02	03:05	1909	3
KSRA	Kasara	00:09	00:12	101	2	-	-	1842	3
IGP	Igatpuri	00:25	00:28	116	2	01:35	01:40	1828	3
NK	Nasik Road	01:25	01:30	166	2	00:05	00:10	1777	3
MMR	Manmad Junction	02:33	02:35	239	2	23:02	23:05	1704	2
CSN	Chalisgaon Junction	03:23	03:25	307	2	04:09	04:10	1637	2
PC	Pachora Junction	03:53	03:55	351	2	04:09	04:10	1592	2
JL	Jalgaon Junction	04:33	04:35	399	2	04:09	04:10	1544	2
BSL	Bhusaval Junction	05:10	05:15	423	2	20:30	20:45	1520	2
VNA	Varangaon	05:33	05:35	436	2	-	-	1507	2
BDWD	Bodwad	05:53	05:55	454	2	04:09	04:10	1490	2
MKU	Malkapur	06:08	06:10	473	2	04:09	04:10	1470	2
NN	Nandura	06:33	06:35	501	2	04:09	04:10	1442	2
SEG	Shegaon	07:03	07:05	526	2	04:09	04:10	1418	2
AK	Akola Junction	08:20	08:25	563	2	04:09	04:10	1934	2
MZR	Murtizapur Junction	08:43	08:45	600	2	04:09	04:10	1934	2
BD	Badnera Junction	09:40	09:45	642	2	04:09	04:10	1934	2
DMN	Dhamangaon	10:21	10:22	687	2	04:09	04:10	1934	2
PLO	Pulgaon	10:39	10:40	707	2	04:09	04:10	1934	2
WR	Wardha Junction	11:10	11:12	737	2	04:09	04:10	1934	2
AJNI	Ajni	12:11	12:12	813	2	04:09	04:10	1934	2
NGP	Nagpur Junction	13:05	13:20	816	2	13:15	13:40	1129	2
ITR	Itwari	13:40	13:42	820	2	04:09	04:10	1934	2
KP	Kamptee	13:56	13:58	830	2	04:09	04:10	1934	2
BRD	Bhandara Road	14:31	14:33	878	2	04:09	04:10	1934	2
TMR	Tumsar Road Junction	14:53	14:55	896	2	04:09	04:10	1934	2
TRO	Tirora	15:10	15:12	916	2	04:09	04:10	1934	2
G	Gondia Junction	15:48	15:58	946	2	10:05	10:15	999	2
AGN	Amgaon	16:15	16:17	968	2	04:09	04:10	1934	2
SKS	Salekasa	16:30	16:32	983	2	04:09	04:10	1934	2
DGG	Dongargarh	17:15	17:17	1019	2	04:09	04:10	1934	2
RJN	Rajnandgaon	17:39	17:41	1050	2	04:09	04:10	1934	2
DURG	Durg	18:30	18:40	1081	2	07:50	08:00	865	2
BQR	Bhilai Nagar	18:46	18:48	1085	2	07:30	07:32	1934	2
BPHB	Bhilai Power House	18:54	18:56	1090	2	07:21	07:23	1934	2
BIA	Bhilai	19:02	19:04	1095	2	07:13	07:15	1934	2
R	Raipur Junction	19:40	19:50	1118	2	06:35	06:45	828	2
TLD	Tilda-Neora	20:21	20:23	1156	2	05:53	05:55	1934	2
BYT	Bhatapara	20:43	20:45	1182	2	05:26	05:28	1934	2
BSP	Bilaspur Junction	21:50	22:05	1229	2	04:30	04:45	718	2
AKT	Akaltara	22:27	22:29	1255	2	03:27	03:29	1934	2
NIA	Janjgir Naila	22:42	22:44	1270	2	03:13	03:15	1934	2
CPH	Champa Junction	22:56	23:01	1281	2	02:59	03:04	1934	2
SKT	Sakti	23:21	23:23	1312	2	02:33	02:35	1934	2
KHS	Kharsia	23:41	23:43	1327	2	02:18	02:20	1934	2
RIG	Raigarh	00:09	00:14	1361	3	01:48	01:53	1934	2
BPH	Belpahar	01:04	01:06	1412	3	01:09	01:11	1934	2
JSG	Jharsuguda Junction	01:45	01:50	1433	3	00:40	00:45	1934	2
GP	Rajgangpur	02:42	02:43	1504	3	23:26	23:27	1934	1
ROU	Rourkela	03:12	03:20	1534	3	22:50	23:00	411	1
MOU	Manoharpur	03:54	03:55	1574	3	22:12	22:13	1934	1
GOL	Goilkera	04:21	04:22	1605	3	21:47	21:48	1934	1
CKP	Chakradharpur	04:55	05:02	1635	3	21:15	21:22	1934	1
SINI	Sini Junction	05:34	05:35	1670	3	20:45	20:46	1934	1
TATA	Tatanagar Junction	06:12	06:22	1697	3	20:13	20:18	248	1
GTS	Ghatsila	07:11	07:13	1733	3	19:22	19:24	1934	1
JGM	Jhargram	07:54	07:56	1793	3	18:42	18:44	1934	1
KGP	Kharagpur Junction	08:45	08:50	1831	3	18:00	18:05	113	1
PKU	Panskura Junction	09:28	09:30	1876	3	17:10	17:15	1934	1
MCA	Mecheda	09:48	09:50	1888	3	16:45	16:50	1934	1
ULB	Uluberia	10:14	10:16	1914	3	16:11	16:13	1934	1
SRC	Santragachi Junction	11:02	11:04	1939	3	15:48	15:50	1934	1
SHM	Kolkata Shalimar	11:35	Destination	1944	3	Source	15:35	0	1

Note: Train no. 18029 halts at Kasara railway station and Igatpuri railway station only for attachment and detachment of bankers respectively. There is no commercial halt at these stations.
