= Bhagat Ki Kothi–Bilaspur Express =

Train in India

Bhagat Ki Kothi–Bilaspur Superfast Express
Overview
- Service type: Superfast
- Locale: Chhattisgarh, Maharashtra, Madhya Pradesh & Rajasthan
- First service: 1 February 2016; 10 years ago
- Current operator: South East Central Railway

Route
- Termini: Bilaspur Junction (BSP); Bhagat Ki Kothi (BGKT)
- Stops: 31
- Distance travelled: 1,820 km (1,131 mi)
- Average journey time: 34 hours 40 minutes
- Service frequency: Bi-weekly
- Train number: 20843 / 20844

On-board services
- Classes: AC First class, AC 2 tier, AC 3 tier, Sleeper class, General Unreserved
- Seating arrangements: Yes
- Sleeping arrangements: Yes
- Catering facilities: On-board catering, E-catering
- Observation facilities: Large windows
- Baggage facilities: No
- Other facilities: Below the seats

Technical
- Rolling stock: LHB coach
- Track gauge: 1,676 mm (5 ft 6 in)
- Operating speed: 130 km/h (81 mph) maximum, 52 km/h (32 mph) average including halts.
- Rake sharing: Rakesh sharing with 20845/20846 Bilaspur-Bikaner Express.
Route map
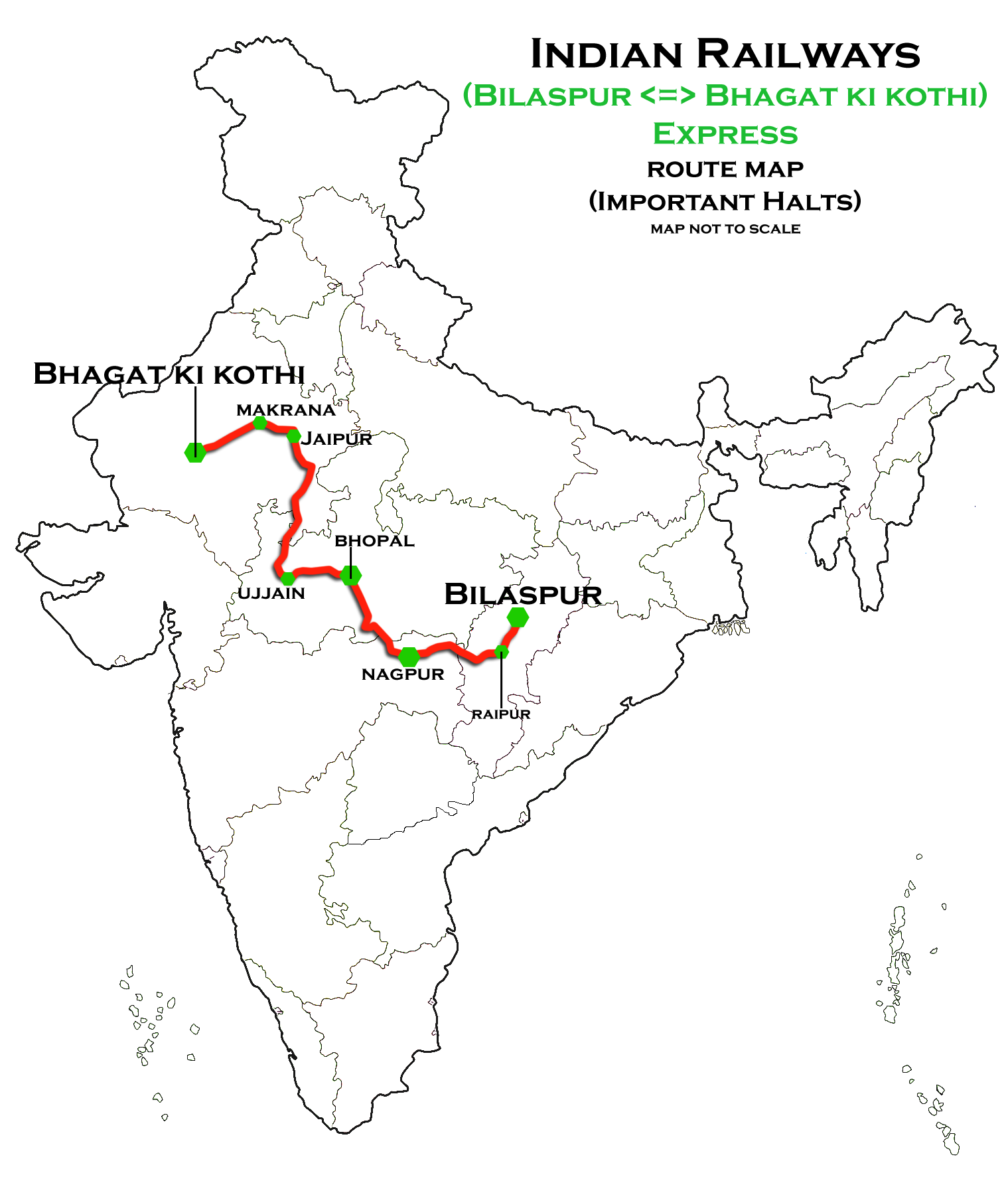

The 20843 / 20844 Bhagat Ki Kothi–Bilaspur Superfast Express is one of the superfast trains of South East Central Railway zone which runs between Bilaspur Junction railway station of Bilaspur, city of Chhattisgarh and Bhagat Ki Kothi railway station, a suburban railway station in Jodhpur, Rajasthan.

== Arrival and departure ==
Train number 20843 departs from Bilaspur Junction on Monday and Tuesday at 18:20, reaching Bhagat Ki Kothi the next day at 05:00. Train number 20844 departs from Bhagat Ki Kothi on Thursday and Sunday at 00:05, reaching Bilaspur Junction the next day at 12:45.

== Routes and halts ==
The important halts of the train are:

- Bilaspur Junction
- Bhatapara
- Raipur Junction
- Bhilai Power House
- Durg Junction
- Rajnandgaon
- Gondia Junction
- Nagpur Junction
- Itarsi Junction
- Bhopal Junction
- Sehore
- Shujalpur
- Ujjain Junction
- Nagda Junction
- Kota Junction
- Sawai Madhopur Junction
- Durgapura
- Jaipur Junction
- Phulera Junction
- Makrana Junction
- Degana Junction
- Merta Road Junction
- Jodhpur Junction
- Bhagat Ki Kothi

== Traction ==
As the route is fully electrified, it is hauled by a Bhilai Loco Shed-based WAP-7 electric locomotive from Bilaspur Junction up to Sawai Madhopur Junction handing over to a Bhagat Ki Kothi Loco Shed-based WAP-7 electric locomotive for the remainder of the journey until Bhagat Ki Kothi.

== Direction reversal ==
This train reverses its direction 3 times,

- Nagpur Junction
- Nagda Junction
- Sawai Madhopur Junction.

== Coach composition ==
This service has six GS coaches, seven Sleeper coaches, three B1, B2, B3 coaches, three AC coaches, and two End on Generation (EOG) coaches.

Loco	1	2	3	4	5	6	7	8	9	10	11	12	13	14	15	16	17	18	19	20	21
	EOG	GS	GS	GS	GS	GS	GS	S1	S2	S3	S4	S5	S6	S7	B1	B2	B3	A1	A2	A3	EOG

== Speed and frequency ==
The train runs with a top speed of 130 km/h and an average speed of 55 km/h.

- Train number 20843 Bilaspur - Bhagat Ki Kothi SF Express (PT) departs from Bilaspur junction (BSP) on Monday and Tuesday. and the last stop (station) of this train is Bhagat Ki Kothi (BGKT).
- Train number 20844 Bhagat Ki Kothi - Bilaspur Express departs from Bhagat Ki Kothi (BGKT) on Thursday and Saturday. and the last stop (station) of this train is Bilaspur junction (BSP). The total distance covered by this train is 1820 km.
