= Hasdeo Express =

Train in India

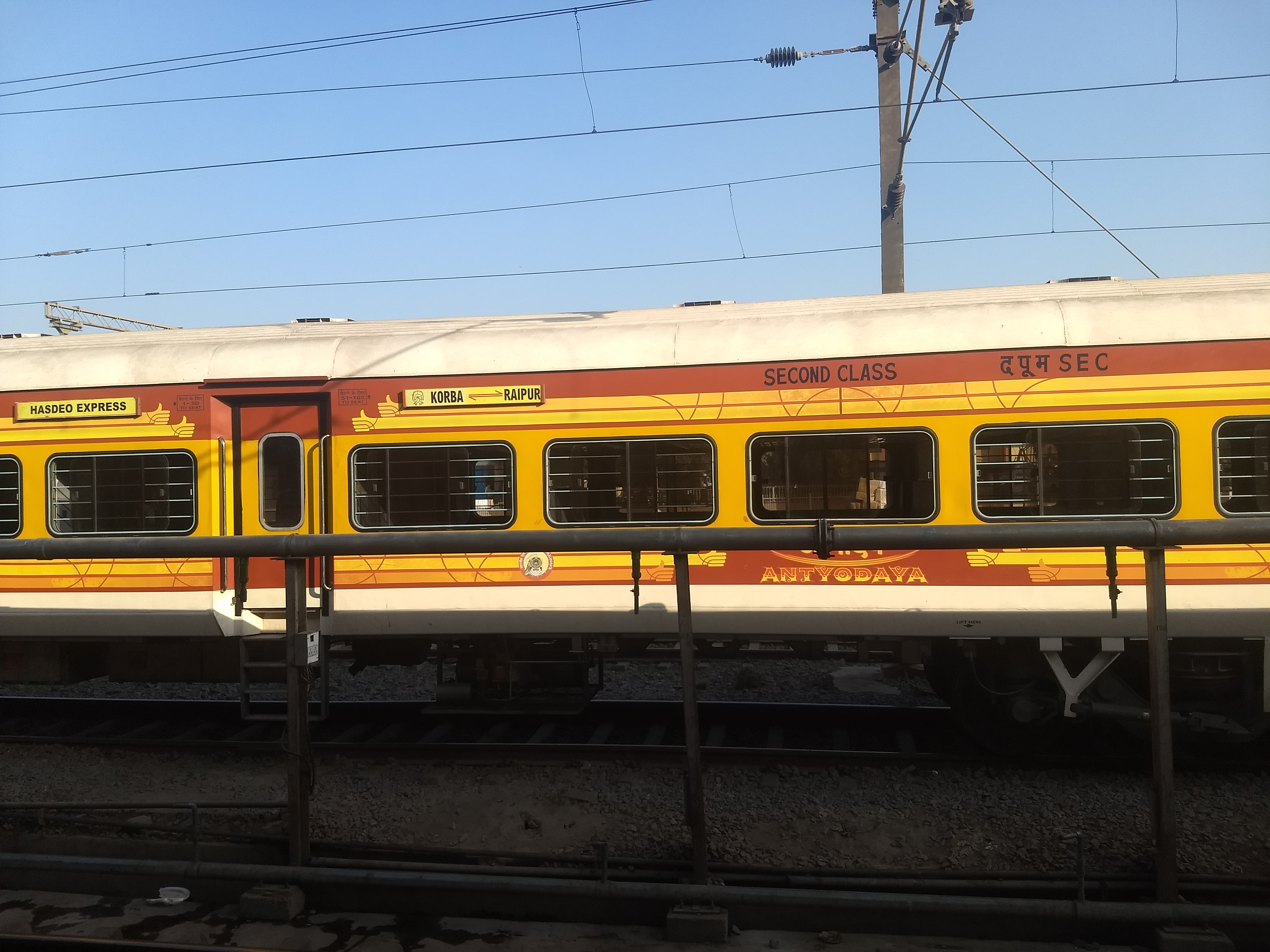
- Hasdeo Express standing at Raipur Junction.

Overview
- Service type: Intercity Express
- Locale: Chhattisgarh
- First service: 7 October 2018; 7 years ago
- Current operator: South East Central Railway

Route
- Termini: Korba (KRBA); Raipur (R)
- Stops: 7
- Distance travelled: 200 km (124 mi)
- Average journey time: 3 hrs 45 mins
- Service frequency: Daily
- Train numbers: 18249 / 18250; 18251 / 18252

On-board services
- Classes: AC Chair car, Second class chair car, General Unreserved
- Seating arrangements: Yes
- Sleeping arrangements: No
- Auto-rack arrangements: Overhead racks
- Catering facilities: On-board catering, E-catering
- Observation facilities: Large windows
- Baggage facilities: Available
- Other facilities: Below the seats

Technical
- Rolling stock: ICF coach/LHB coach
- Track gauge: 1,676 mm (5 ft 6 in)
- Operating speed: 53 km/h (33 mph) average including halts.

The 18249/18250 & 18251/18252 Hasdeo Express are two sets of Superfast Intercity Express trains which run between Korba and Raipur. These trains are operated by the South East Central Railway zone. This train is named after Hasdeo river, a tributary river of Mahanadi.

== Coach Composition ==
18249/18250

- 1 SLR
- 5 Second Class (Unreserved)
- 4 Second Class (Reserved)
- 1 AC Chair Car
- 1 EOG

18251/18252

- 2 SLR
- 6 Second Class (Unreserved)
- 4 Second Class (Reserved)
- 2 AC Chair Car

18249/18250 runs with LHB coaches. This train was flagged off by Piyush Goyal.18251/18252 runs with ICF coaches.

== Route & halts ==
- Korba
- Champa
- Janjgir Naila
- Akaltara
- Bilaspur
- Bhatapara
- Tilda-Neora
- Raipur

== Traction & maintenance ==
Both sets of trains are hauled by a WAP-7 locomotive of Bhilai Loco Shed. The trains are maintained in Bilaspur Junction (Bilaspur Division SEC) coaching complex.
