= Tilda-Neora railway station =

Railway station in Chhattisgarh, India

Tilda-Neora
- Indian Railways logo

General information
- Location: Simga-Tilda Neora – Kharora State Highway 20, Tilda-Neora, Raipur district, Chhattisgarh; India
- Coordinates: 21.5506°N 81.7946°E
- Elevation: 293 metres (961 ft)
- System: Indian Railways station
- Owner: Indian Railways
- Operator: Raipur railway division
- Line: Raipur–Bilaspur branch line
- Platforms: 4
- Tracks: 5

Construction
- Structure type: Standard (on-ground station)
- Parking: Yes

Other information
- Status: Triple Electric-Line
- Station code: TLD
- Fare zone: South East Central Railway

Services
Preceding station	Indian Railways	Following station
Baikunth towards ?	South East Central Railway zone Raipur–Bilaspur branch line	Hathbandh towards ?
Location
- Location within Chhattisgarh Location within India

Tilda-Neora railway station is a main railway station in Raipur district, Chhattisgarh, India. Its code is TLD. It serves Tilda-Neora Urban area. The station consists of four platforms. The station lies on the Raipur–Bilaspur branch line of Bilaspur–Nagpur section.

== Major trains ==
- Sarnath Express
- Shivnath Express
- Shalimar–Lokmanya Tilak Terminus Express
- Amarkantak Express
- Raigarh–Hazrat Nizamuddin Gondwana Express
- South Bihar Express
- Raigarh–Gondia Jan Shatabdi Express
- Chhattisgarh Express
- Betwa Express
- Bilaspur–Tirupati Express
- Nagpur–Bilaspur Intercity Express
- Howrah–Ahmedabad Superfast Express
- Durg–Nautanwa Express (via Sultanpur)
- Hasdeo Express
- Durg–Ambikapur Express
- Durg–Jammu Tawi Express
- Korba–Visakhapatnam Express
- Durg–Ajmer Express

== History Of Change Name "Tilda" To "Tilda-Neora" ==
After Receiving the No Objection from the Home Ministry Government Of India on the application of National & Zonal Railway Users Consultative Council Member Deepak Sharma Tilda-Neora in the year 2018 October, the Government of India and the State Government have been named "Tilda-Neora" in all the offices of the state government and Tilda railway station. The applicant of this station name change can be confirmed by the confirmation passed by the municipality of Tilda-Neora and by the documents available in the Department of Revenue Department Chhattisgarh Government.
