= Wainganga Superfast Express =

Train in India

Overview
- Service type: Superfast
- Locale: Karnataka, Andhra Pradesh, Telangana, Maharashtra & Chhattisgarh
- First service: 1 October 2002; 23 years ago
- Current operator: South Western Railway

Route
- Termini: Yesvantpur (YPR); Korba (KRBA)
- Stops: 26
- Distance travelled: 1,614 km (1,003 mi)
- Average journey time: 28 hours 50 minutes
- Service frequency: Bi-Weekly
- Train number: 12251 / 12252

On-board services
- Classes: AC 2 Tier, AC 3 Tier, Sleeper Class, General Unreserved
- Seating arrangements: Yes
- Sleeping arrangements: Yes
- Catering facilities: On-board catering E-catering
- Observation facilities: Large windows
- Baggage facilities: Available
- Other facilities: Below the seats

Technical
- Rolling stock: LHB coach
- Track gauge: 1,676 mm (5 ft 6 in); Broad Gauge
- Operating speed: 56 km/h (35 mph) average including halts.
Route map
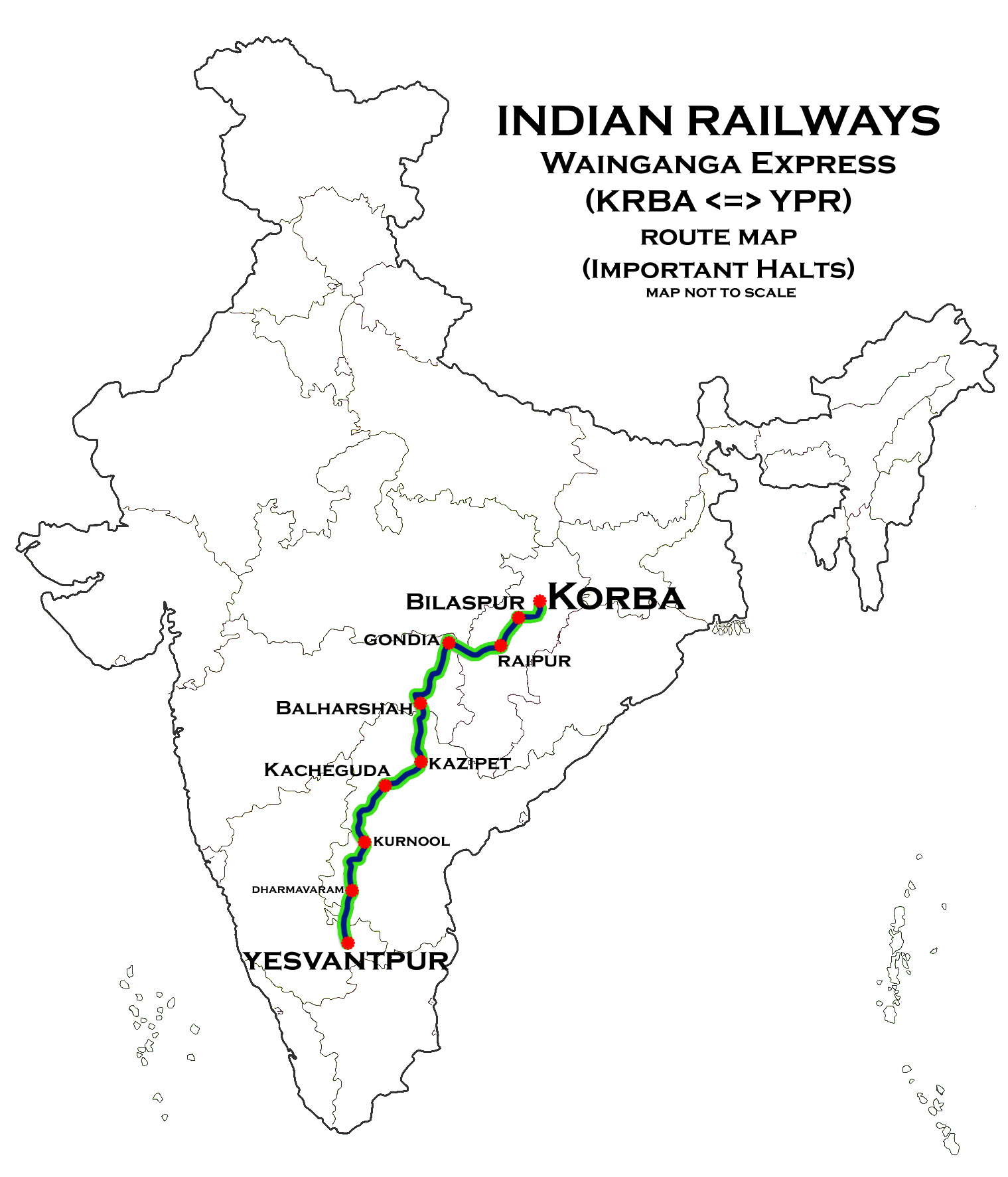

The 12251 / 12252 Wainganga Superfast Express is a superfast train service of Indian Railways that runs twice a week between the southern city of Bangalore and mining city of Korba in Chhattisgarh state. 12251 Wainganga SF Express departs from Bangalore's Yesvantpur railway station on Tuesdays and Fridays. While on return journey, 12252 Wainganga Express departs from Korba on Thursdays and Sundays. Wainganga Express runs through the states of Karnataka, Andhra Pradesh, Telangana, Maharashtra and Chhattisgarh to cover a distance of 1614 km in 28 hours and 50 minutes at an average speed of 59 km/h. The train is named after Wainganga River. The train was introduced in 2002 between Durg and Yesvantpur, scheduled to run weekly once. It was later extended to Bilaspur and then Korba with frequency increased from weekly to bi-weekly.

== Route and halts ==
- Yesvantpur Junction
- Dharmavaram
- Anantapur
- Dhone Junction
- Kurnool City
- Kacheguda
- Kazipet
- Balharshah
- Chanda Fort
- Nagbhir Junction
- Arjuni
- Gondia
- Dongargarh
- Rajnandgaon
- Durg
- Raipur Junction
- Bilaspur
- Champa Junction
- Korba

== Traction ==
before the electrified route stretch, this superfast train was used to have diesel link WDP-4D and WDM-3A or WDM-3D. As the entire route is electrified, it is hauled by a Krishnarajapuram Loco Shed-based WAP-7 electric locomotive from end to end journey.
