= Howrah–Mumbai CSMT Mail (via Nagpur) =

Train in India

Howrah-Mumbai CSMT Mail (via Nagpur)

Overview
- Service type: Superfast Express
- Locale: West Bengal, Jharkhand, Odisha, Chhattisgarh & Maharashtra
- First service: 25 September 1893; 133 years ago
- Current operator: South Eastern Railway

Route
- Termini: Howrah (HWH); Mumbai CSMT (CSMT)
- Stops: 42 (2 one directional halts)
- Distance travelled: 1,968 km (1,223 mi)
- Average journey time: 33 hours
- Service frequency: Daily
- Train number: 12809 / 12810

On-board services
- Classes: AC First, AC 2 tier, AC 3 tier, AC Economy, Sleeper Class, General Unreserved
- Seating arrangements: Yes
- Sleeping arrangements: Yes
- Catering facilities: Available
- Observation facilities: Large windows
- Baggage facilities: Available
- Other facilities: Below the seats

Technical
- Rolling stock: LHB coach
- Track gauge: 1,676 mm (5 ft 6 in)
- Operating speed: 130 km/h (81 mph) maximum, 61 km/h (38 mph) average including halts

Howrah–Mumbai CSMT Mail (via Nagpur), with train numbers 12810 and 12809 is a Superfast Express train belonging to Indian Railways and maintained by South Eastern Railway that runs between Howrah Junction in West Bengal and Mumbai CSMT in Maharashtra.

It operates as train number 12810 from Howrah to Mumbai and as train number 12809 in the reverse direction.

== History ==
Howrah Mumbai Mail via Nagpur was started by Bengal Nagpur Railway as a through coach service on 1892, with trains changed at Nagpur on GIPR and Asansol on EIR. The through coach service was converted to a dedicated train after the completion of Tatanagar - Kharagpur - Howrah line and started on 1900 as the Howrah Bombay Mail via Nagpur, with train numbers 2 UP from Howrah to Victoria Terminus and 1 DN from Victoria Terminus to Howrah. It was a premium train service, with First Class and Second Class Reserved Carriages attached to the train, with Restaurant Car facility availed to these passengers. Intermediate and Third Class coaches were also attached to this train.

The number 2 DN / 1 UP remained till 1989 (with operation shifted to South Eastern Railway after bifurcation of Bengal Nagpur Railway in 1955) when Indian Railways shifted to a 4-digit numbering scheme. Train number was changed as 8002 UP for Howrah - Bombay Mail and 8001 DN for Bombay - Howrah Mail. After its conversion to a superfast train, train number was again changed as 2810 UP for Howrah - Mumbai CST Mail and 2809 DN for Mumbai CST - Howrah Mail.

After 2010, due to the 5-digit numbering scheme directive by Indian Railways, train numbers were changed to 12810 UP for Howrah - Mumbai Mail and 12809 DN for Mumbai CSMT - Howrah Mail.

== Coach composition ==
This train service, in its current iteration, runs with 22 LHB Coaches. The composition is

- 1 Luggage Brake and Generator Van
- 1 Divyangjan, Luggage and Brake Van
- 2 Unreserved Second Class
- 7 Sleeper Class
- 1 AC Buffet Car (Pantry Car)
- 2 AC Economy
- 5 AC Three Tier
- 2 AC Two Tier
- 1 AC First Class

12810 and 12809 are operated using 4 rakes of 22 LHB coaches, with maintenance done after every round trip at Santragachi coaching depot. Since this is a mail train, India Post operates a railway mail service on 12810 and 12809 services

== Timings ==
12810 Howrah Mumbai Mail via Nagpur leaves Howrah everyday at 07:35 PM and arrives at Mumbai CSMT on the third day at 04:25 AM.

12809 Mumbai Howrah Mail via Nagpur leaves Mumbai CSMT everyday at 09:10 PM and arrives Howrah on the third day at 06:20 AM.

== Routes & halts ==
The Howrah Mumbai Mail traverses the whole Howrah - Nagpur - Mumbai line and was the first train to run on the whole route after its opening, which started in 1900. Halts of this service are listed below:

12810/12809 Howrah Mumbai Mail (via Nagpur)
Halts	Additional information
Howrah	Source
Santragachi Jn	Halt only for 12809
Kharagpur Jn	
Tatanagar Jn	
Chakradharpur	
Rourkela Jn	
Jharsuguda Jn	
Brajrajnagar	
Belpahar	
Raigarh	
Kharsia	
Sakti	
Champa Jn	
Bilaspur Jn	
Bhatapara	
Raipur Jn	
Durg Jn	
Raj Nandgaon	
Dongargarh	
Gondia Jn	
Tumsar Road Jn	
Bhandara Road	
Nagpur Jn	
Sewagram Jn	
Wardha Jn	
Pulgaon	
Dhamangaon	
Badnera Jn	
Murtizapur Jn	
Akola Jn	
Shegaon	
Jalamb	
Nandura	
Malkapur	
Bhusaval Jn	
Jalgaon Jn	
Chalisgaon Jn	
Manmad Jn	
Nashik Road	
Igatpuri	
Kalyan Jn	
Thane	Halt only for 12809
Dadar	
Mumbai Chhatrapati Shivaji Maharaj Terminus	Destination

== Traction ==
It is hauled by a Santragachi Loco Shed or Tatanagar Loco Shed based head on generation equipped WAP-7 electric locomotive from end to end.

== Accidents ==
=== 2024 Jharkhand Train Collision ===
2024 Jharkhand Train Collision

Details
- Date: 30 July 2024; 03:39 IST
- Location: Barabamboo, Jharkhand
- Country: India
- Line: Howrah–Nagpur–Mumbai line
- Operator: South Eastern Railway
- Owner: Indian Railways
- Incident type: Collision
- Cause: Derailed freight cars

Statistics
- Trains: 2
- Deaths: 2
- Injured: 40

On 1 August 2024, 12810 Howrah Mumbai Mail, which had started service on 30 July 2024, derailed at 03:39 AM near Badabamboo in Jharkhand (which comes under Chakradharpur division of the South Eastern Railway zone), when it collided with derailed freight cars. 18 out of total 22 coaches were derailed in the incident. The train was travelling at around 120 km/h (75 mph) when it collided with derailed freight cars. 2 people were killed in the derailment, while more than 40 people were seriously injured. The Ministry of Railways announced an ex-gratia of INR 10 lakhs to the families of the deceased in the derailment, INR 5 lakhs towards grievously injured victims of the derailment and INR 1 lakh towards simple injuries occurred during derailment.

This was the fourth major railway accident of the 2024 calendar year in the Indian Railways.
