= South Bihar Express =

Train in India

Overview
- Service type: Express
- Status: Active
- Locale: Chhattisgarh, Odisha, Jharkhand, West Bengal & Bihar
- First service: 1966; 60 years ago (extended to Ara)
- Current operator: East Central Railway
- Ridership: The train generally sees high passenger traffic year-round, requiring early booking, often resulting in waitlisted (WL) tickets.

Route
- Termini: Durg (DURG); Ara (ARA)
- Stops: 53
- Distance travelled: 1,162 km (722 mi)
- Average journey time: 26 hrs 40 mins
- Service frequency: Daily. (Note: Runs seven days in a week for every direction.)
- Train number: 13287 / 13288

On-board services
- Classes: AC First Class, AC 2 Tier, AC 3 Tier, Sleeper Class, General Unreserved
- Seating arrangements: Yes
- Sleeping arrangements: Yes
- Catering facilities: On-board catering, E-catering is available at DURG, R, BSP, CPH, RIG, JSG, ROU, TATA, PRR & PNBE.
- Observation facilities: Large windows
- Baggage facilities: No
- Other facilities: Below the seats

Technical
- Rolling stock: LHB coach
- Track gauge: 1,676 mm (5 ft 6 in)
- Operating speed: 46 km/h (29 mph) average including halts.

The 13287 / 13288 South Bihar Express is an express train belonging to East Central Railway zone that runs between Durg Junction and Ara Junction in India. It is currently being operated with 13287/13288 train numbers on a daily basis.

== Service ==
The 13287 South Bihar Express has an average speed of 45 km/h and covers 1162 km in 25h 55m. The 13288 South Bihar Express has an average speed of 46 km/h and covers 1162 km in 25h 35m.

== Traction ==
The train is hauled by a Gomoh Loco Shed or Samastipur Loco Shed based WAP-7 electric locomotive from Ara Junction to Asansol Junction. From Asansol Junction to Durg Junction it is hauled by a Tatanagar Loco Shed based WAP-7 electric locomotive and vice versa.

== Schedule ==
13287 / 13288 Durg Junction–Ara Junction South Bihar Express Schedule
Train Type	Mail / Express
Distance	1162 km (13287) / 1162 km (13288)
Average Speed	~46 km/h
Journey Time (Durg Junction → Ara Junction)	~26 hrs 40 min
Journey Time (Ara Junction → Durg Junction)	~25 hrs 55 min
Classes Available	AC 1-tier, AC 2-tier, AC 3-tier, AC 3-Tier Economy, Sleeper Class, General Unreserved
Operating Days	Daily
Railway Zone	East Central Railway

== Route and timetable ==
Durg – Ara - South Bihar Express
13287 DURG → ARA				13288 ARA → DURG			
Station	Arr.	Dep.	Dist. (km)	Station	Arr.	Dep.	Dist. (km)
Durg Junction	—	06:50	0	Bihar Ara Junction	—	18:45	0
Bhilai Power House	06:59	07:01	8	Bihta	19:04	19:06	21
Raipur Junction	07:35	07:45	37	Danapur	19:30	19:40	39
Tilda-Neora	08:16	08:18	75	Patna Junction	20:03	20:10	49
Bhatapara	08:38	08:40	101	Rajendra Nagar Terminal	20:18	20:23	51
Bilaspur Junction	09:40	09:55	147	Patna Sahib	20:33	20:37	58
Akaltara	10:21	10:23	174	Fatuha Junction	20:45	20:47	70
	09:43	09:45	483	Khusropur	20:56	20:58	79
[[ railway station|]]	11:30	11:35	562	Bakhtiyarpur Junction	21:10	21:12	94
	12:29	12:30	617	Athmal Gola	21:20	21:22	103
[[ railway station|]]	13:43	13:45	686	Barh	21:31	21:33	112
[[ railway station|]]	14:35	14:37	762	Mokama Junction	22:00	22:05	138
[[ railway station|]]	16:00	16:10	868	Hathidah Junction	22:15	22:17	146
	17:47	17:52	954	Barhiya	22:27	22:29	155
	20:53	20:55	1161	Lakhisarai Junction	22:45	22:47	171
	21:36	21:38	1213	Kiul Junction	22:51	22:56	172
	22:22	22:24	1249	Jamui	23:18	23:20	199
	22:50	22:52	1296	Jhajha	00:25	00:30	225
	00:10	00:35	1327	Jharkhad Jasidih Junction	01:02	01:07	269
	01:50	01:52	1391	Madhupur Junction	01:29	01:33	298
	02:50	02:55	1445	Jamtara	02:04	02:06	340
	04:00	04:02	1513	Chittaranjan	02:16	02:18	355
	07:18	07:20	1636	West Bengal Asansol Junction	03:20	03:40	380
[[ railway station|]]	09:53	10:00	1780	Burnpur	03:49	03:50	385
	11:07	11:09	1870	Joychandi Pahar	04:28	04:30	417
	12:08	12:10	1939	Anara	04:46	04:48	430
	12:45	12:50	1978	Purulia Junction	05:20	05:25	456
[[ railway station|]]	14:15	14:20	2004	Barabhum	05:55	05:57	488
[[ railway station|]]	15:40	15:45	2058	Jharkhad Chandil Junction	06:30	06:31	510
[[ railway station|]]	17:05	17:10	2110	Kandra Junction	06:44	06:45	524
[[ railway station|]]	18:30	18:40	2161	Gamharia Junction	07:00	07:02	534
	18:56	18:58	2176	Tatanagar Junction	07:35	08:05	545
[[ railway station|]]	20:18	20:20	2217	Sini Junction	08:28	08:30	572
[[ railway station|]]	20:43	20:45	2225	Rajkharsawan Junction	08:44	08:46	587
	21:28	21:30	2253	Chakradharpur	09:05	09:10	607
[[ railway station|]]	23:00	—	2270	Sonua	09:24	09:25	628
[[ railway station|]]	15:40	15:45	2058	Goilkera	09:38	09:40	640
[[ railway station|]]	17:05	17:10	2110	Manoharpur	10:10	10:12	668
[[ railway station|]]	18:30	18:40	2161	Odisha Rourkela Junction	10:52	11:00	708
	18:56	18:58	2176	Rajgangpur	11:28	11:30	738
[[ railway station|]]	20:18	20:20	2217	Bamra	11:56	11:58	773
[[ railway station|]]	20:43	20:45	2225	Bagdehi	12:22	12:24	788
	21:28	21:30	2253	Jharsuguda Junction	13:05	13:10	809
[[ railway station|]]	23:00	—	2270	Brajrajnagar	13:28	13:30	681
[[ railway station|]]	15:40	15:45	2058	Belpahar	13:39	13:41	830
[[ railway station|]]	17:05	17:10	2110	Chhattisgarh Raigarh	14:15	14:20	881
[[ railway station|]]	18:30	18:40	2161	Kharsia	14:45	14:47	915
	18:56	18:58	2176	Sakti	14:58	15:00	930
[[ railway station|]]	20:18	20:20	2217	Champa Junction	15:20	15:25	961
[[ railway station|]]	20:43	20:45	2225	Akaltara	15:45	15:47	986
	21:28	21:30	2253	Bilaspur Junction	17:30	17:45	1013
[[ railway station|]]	23:00	—	2270	Bhatapara	18:25	18:27	1060
[[ railway station|]]	20:18	20:20	2217	Tilda-Neora	18:48	18:50	1086
[[ railway station|]]	20:43	20:45	2225	Raipur Junction	19:30	19:35	1124
	21:28	21:30	2253	Bhilai Power House	20:03	20:05	1152
[[ railway station|]]	23:00	—	2270	Durg Junction	20:40	—	1161

== Coach composition ==
Category	Coaches	Total
General Unreserved (GEN)	GEN1, GEN2, GEN3, GEN4	4
Sleeper Class (SL)	S1, S2, S3, S4, S5, S6	6
AC 3 Tier (3A)	B1, B2, B3, B4, B5, B6	6
AC 3 Economy (3E)	M1	1
AC 2 Tier (2A)	A1, A2	2
AC First Class (1A)	H1	1
End-On Generation coach (EOG)	EOG	2
Total Coaches		22

- Primary Maintenance – Ara CD

== Direction reversals ==
The train reverses its direction twice at;

- Asansol Junction
- Tatanagar Junction.

== See also ==
- Ara Junction railway station
- Durg railway station
