= Chhattisgarh Express =

Train in India

Overview
- Service type: Express
- First service: 1 January 1977; 49 years ago
- Current operator: South East Central Railway

Route
- Termini: Korba (KRBA); Amritsar (ASR)
- Stops: 90
- Distance travelled: 2,102 km (1,306 mi)
- Average journey time: 43 hours 22 minutes
- Service frequency: Daily
- Train number: 18237 / 18238

On-board services
- Classes: AC First Class, AC 2 Tier, AC 3 Tier, Sleeper Class, General Unreserved
- Seating arrangements: Yes
- Sleeping arrangements: Yes
- Catering facilities: Available
- Observation facilities: Large windows
- Baggage facilities: Available
- Other facilities: Below the seats

Technical
- Rolling stock: LHB coach
- Track gauge: 1,676 mm (5 ft 6 in)
- Operating speed: 49 km/h (30 mph) average including halts.
Route map
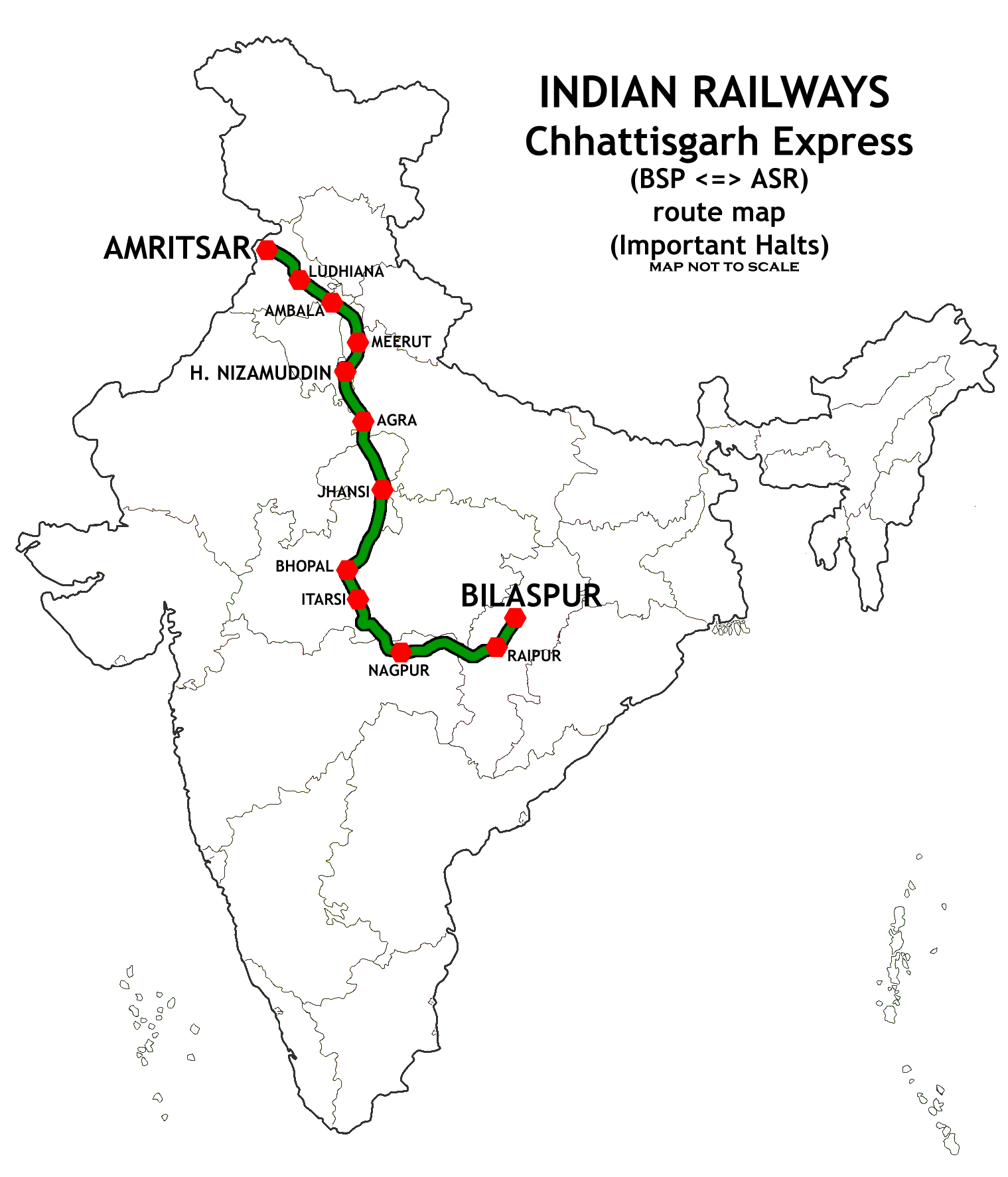
- Chhattisgarh Express (Amritsar–Bilaspur) route map

The 18237 / 18238 Chhattisgarh Express is an express train that connects Korba and Amritsar. The name of the express train represents the state of Chhattisgarh. It runs through the states of Chhattisgarh, Maharashtra, Madhya Pradesh, Uttar Pradesh, Delhi, Haryana and Punjab and covers a distance of 2,109 km (1,310 mi).

== History ==
It was first introduced in 1977 as the Bhopal–Bilaspur Chhattisgarh Aanchal Express and used to run between Bilaspur and Rani Kamalapati (Bhopal). It was the first train to originate from newly constructed suburban railway station at Rani Kamalapati. In 1980, the train was extended to main railway station of Bhopal; Bhopal Junction. Later in year 1987, it was extended to Hazrat Nizamuddin and New Delhi and then finally in year 1990 to Amritsar. In 2018-2019, train 18237 was extended from Korba to Bilaspur.

== Route & halts ==
The train runs from Korba via Champa Junction, Bilaspur Junction, Raipur Junction, Durg Junction, Rajnandgaon, Dongargarh, Gondia Junction, Nagpur Junction, Itarsi Junction, Narmadapuram, Bhopal Junction, Jhansi Junction, Gwalior Junction, Agra Cantonment, Meerut City, Muzaffarnagar, Saharanpur Junction, Yamunanagar-Jagadhri, Ambala Cantonment Junction, Ludhiana Junction, Jalandhar City Junction to Amritsar.

== Schedule ==
Train no. 18238 leaves for its destination stop Amritsar (ASR) at 04:10 PM and reaching in Bilaspur (BSP) at 12:15 PM on third day. On its return journey, train No.18237 leaves Korba (KRBA) at 11:15 AM and reaching Amritsar (ASR) at 08:10 AM on third day. The longest halt it took during the journey was at Amla Jn for around 20–25 minutes until 2020 when its link train Pench Valley Passenger was made as a separate Express. Around 20–25 minutes halt at Amla Jn was for attachment & detachment system of Chhattisgarh Express & Pench Valley Passenger for period from 2003 or 2006 to 2020.

== Coach composition ==
This Train had LHB coach.

- 1 SLR
- 1 EOG
- 2 General Unreserved
- 7 Sleeper
- 1 Pantry Car
- 6 3AC
- 2 2AC
- 1 1AC

== Traction ==
The train is powered by a Ajni Loco Shed-based WAP-7 electric locomotive from Gevra Road to Amritsar and vice versa (terminates at Bilaspur.)
