= 2025 Chhattisgarh train collision =

Train collision in Chhattisgarh, India

Details
- Date: 4 November 2025 c.4:00 p.m. IST
- Location: Near Bilaspur, Chhattisgarh
- Country: India
- Line: Howrah–Nagpur–Mumbai line
- Operator: South East Central Railway
- Owner: Indian Railways
- Service: 68733 Gevra Road—Bilaspur Junction MEMU
- Incident type: Collision
- Cause: Passenger train ignoring signal

Statistics
- Trains: 2 trains: A MEMU; A goods train
- Deaths: 11
- Injured: 20

On 4 November 2025, a passenger train collided with a goods train near Bilaspur in the Indian state of Chhattisgarh. The passenger train, which was traveling between Gevra and Bilaspur on the Howrah–Nagpur–Mumbai line, collided with the rear of a stationary goods train. The accident resulted in the deaths of at least 11 people and injuries to at least 20 others.

== Crash ==
At about 4:00 p.m. IST on 4 November 2025, a MEMU passenger train of the Indian Railways, which originated from Gevra, was traveling towards Bilaspur on the Howrah–Nagpur–Mumbai line. The passenger train collided with the rear of a stationary goods train near the Bilaspur station. The collision resulted in some of the coaches of the passenger train climbing over each other.

== Victims ==
At least 11 people, including the driver of the passenger train, were killed in the collision. An estimated 20 people were reported to be injured in the accident.

== Aftermath ==
The Chhattisgarh government announced a compensation of ₹1 million (US$12,000) to the families of the deceased, ₹0.5 million (US$5,900) to the seriously injured, and ₹0.1 million (US$1,200) to the minor injured.The collision resulted in damage to tracks, overhead electrical wires and the signalling system, which resulted in the traffic on the section being disrupted with several trains being cancelled or diverted.

== Investigation ==
A preliminary investigation found that the passenger train overshot a red signal, and entered the track section where the goods train was halted.
