= Thiruvananthpuram–Korba Express =

Passenger train in India

Thiruvananthapuram North–Korba Superfast Express
Overview
- Service type: Express
- First service: 1 October 1987; 38 years ago
- Current operator: Southern Railway

Route
- Termini: Thiruvananthapuram North (KCVL); Korba (KRBA)
- Stops: 53
- Distance travelled: 2,513 km (1,562 mi)
- Average journey time: 51 hours 15 minutes
- Service frequency: Bi-Weekly
- Train number: 22647 / 22648

On-board services
- Classes: AC 2 Tier, AC 3 Tier, Sleeper Class, General Unreserved, Ac Three Tier Economy
- Seating arrangements: Yes
- Sleeping arrangements: Yes
- Catering facilities: Available
- Observation facilities: Large windows
- Baggage facilities: No
- Other facilities: Below the seats

Technical
- Rolling stock: LHB coach
- Track gauge: 1,676 mm (5 ft 6 in)
- Operating speed: 55 km/h (34 mph) average including halts.
Route map
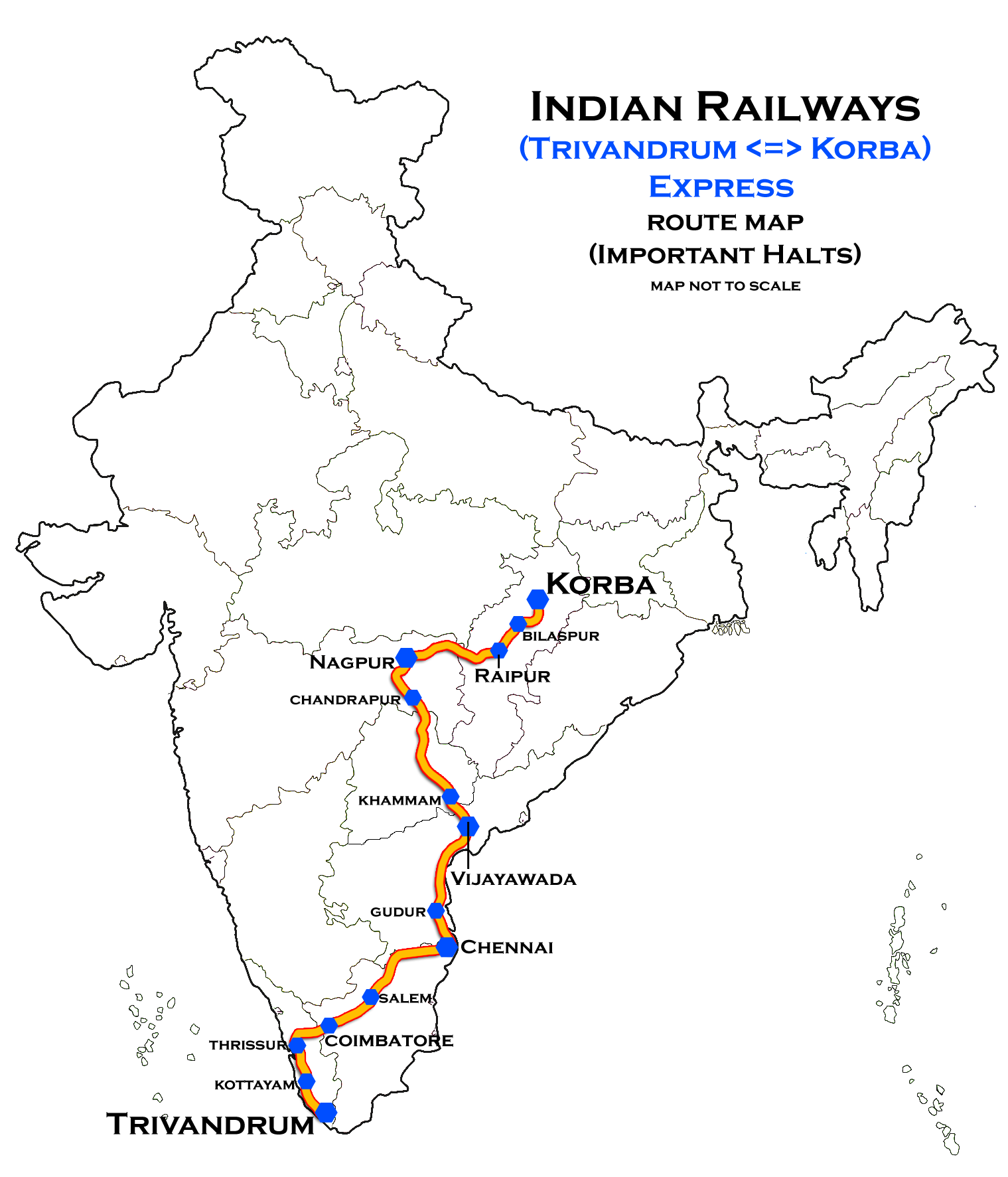

The 22647 / 22648 Thiruvananthapuram North–Korba Express is an express train belonging to Indian Railways Southern zone that runs between Thiruvananthapuram North and Korba in India.

It operates as train number 22648 from Thiruvananthapuram Central to Korba and as train number 22647 in the reverse direction, serving the states of Kerala, Tamil Nadu, Andhra Pradesh, Telangana, Maharashtra and Chhattisgarh.

== Coaches ==
The 22648 / 47 Kochuveli–Korba Express has one AC 2-tier, 4 Ac Three Tier Economy, three AC 3-tier, 11 sleeper class, three general unreserved and two SLR (seating with luggage rake) coaches. It has a pantry car.

As is customary with most train services in India, coach composition may be amended at the discretion of Indian Railways depending on demand.

== Schedule ==
Train number	Station code	Departure station	Departure time	Departure day	Arrival station	Arrival time	Arrival day
22647	KRBA	Korba	7:40 PM	Wednesday Saturday	Trivandrum Cntl	3:40 PM	Friday Monday
22648	TVC	Trivandrum Cntl	6:15 AM	Monday Thursday	Korba	3:00 AM	Wednesday Saturday

== Service ==
The 22648 Kochuveli –Korba Express covers the distance of 2,513 km (1,562 mi) in 45 hours 20 mins (51 km/h) and in 45 hours 35 mins as the 22647 Korba–Thiruvananthapuram Central (55 km/h).

As the average speed of the train is equal to 55 km/h (34 mph), as per railway rules, its fare includes a Superfast surcharge.

== Routing ==
The 22648 / 47 runs from Thiruvananthapuram Central via Kollam Junction, Chengannur, Tiruvalla, Kottayam, Ernakulam Town, Shoranur Junction, Coimbatore Junction, Chennai Central, Ongole ,Vijayawada Junction, Khammam, Balharshah Junction, Nagpur Junction, Raipur Junction, Bilaspur Junction to Korba.

== Traction ==
As the route is fully electrified, an Erode or Royapuram-based WAP-4 or WAP-7 powers the train up to its entire journey. The train changes direction (loco reversal) at Chennai Central (MAS).
