= Vasuki (train) =

Goods train run by Indian railways

Vasuki is the longest goods train run by Indian railways. It was run on 22 January 2021 by the “Raipur” division of “South East Central Railway (SECR)” zone of Indian railways. The train was formed by amalgamating five rakes of goods trains as one unit. The train was run from “Bhilai D cabin” to “Korba” station.

== Salient Features ==
Vasuki train’s salient features are as follows.

- Its total length is around 3.5 kilometres.
- It covers a distance of 224 kilometres from “Bhilai D Cabin” of Raipur division to “Korba station” of Bilaspur division in seven hours.
- It comprises 300 wagons (295 wagons and 6 engines) of long haul rakes of six goods trains.
- It is operated by single loco pilot, with an assistant loco pilot and one guard.
- The leading (front) electric locomotive (engine) controls the entire train with the simultaneous functioning of the rear locomotives through electronic transmission.
- It saves operational time, cost, needs less staff, and affects quicker delivery of goods.

== Previous record ==
Previous record of longest train on Indian railways was that of a 2.8 km long freight train named 'SeshNaag'. This was also operated by the SECR (South East Central Railways) on 2 July 2020. It comprises 251 empty wagons (amalgamation of 4 empty BOXN rakes) and was run between Nagpur station and Korba station. This train was powered by 4 sets of electric locomotives.
