= Bhilai Power House railway station =

Railway station in Chhattisgarh

Bhilai Power House
- Indian Railways logo

General information
- Location: NH- 53, Power House, Bhilai, Durg district, Chhattisgarh; India
- Coordinates: 21.2081°N 81.3754°E
- Elevation: 311 metres (1,020 ft)
- System: Indian Railways station
- Owner: Indian Railways
- Operator: South East Central Railways
- Line: Bilaspur–Nagpur section of Howrah–Nagpur–Mumbai line
- Platforms: 3
- Tracks: 3
- Connections: Auto stand

Construction
- Structure type: Standard (on ground station)
- Parking: Yes
- Cycle facilities: Yes
- Accessible: Available

Other information
- Status: Functioning
- Station code: BPHB
- Zone(s): South East Central Railway zone
- Division(s): Raipur

History
- Opened: 1 November 1956; 69 years ago
- Electrified: 1970–71

Passengers
- 50000-60000
Location
- Location within Chhattisgarh Location within India

Bhilai Power House Railway Station is the second main railway station in Durg district in the Indian state of Chhattisgarh. Its code is BPHB. It serves the Bhilai urban areas. The station consists of three platforms. The Bhilai Power House railway station is one of five in Bhilai city. It is well connected with other major cities. It has been rated grade A by Indian Railways. This railway station is most important among other 2 railway station which provide railway connection for Bhilai. Its too nearest from Bhilai Steel Plant about 1 Kilometer south. ACC Jamul cement plant have in 2 Kilometer north of this railway station.

== Major trains ==
- Raipur–Dalli Rajhara Express
- Durg–Ambikapur Express
- Shivnath Express
- Sarnath Express
- Shalimar–Lokmanya Tilak Terminus Express
- Bhagat Ki Kothi–Bilaspur Express
- Bilaspur–Bikaner Express
- Durg–Nautanwa Express (via Sultanpur)
- Puri–Ahmedabad Express
- Chhattisgarh Express
- Puri–Durg Express
- South Bihar Express
- Gevra Road-Nagpur Shivnath Express
- Howrah–Ahmedabad Superfast Express
- Amarkantak Express
- Nagpur–Bilaspur InterCity Express
- Puri–Ahmedabad Express
- Visakhapatnam–Durg Passenger
- Raipur–Itwari Passenger
- Tatanagar–Itwari Passenger
