= Gevra Road railway station =

Railway station in Chhattisgarh

Gevra Road
- Indian Railways logo

General information
- Location: Vikas Nagar, Kusmunda, Korba, Chhattisgarh; India
- Coordinates: 22.3493°N 82.6462°E
- Elevation: 306 metres (1,004 ft)
- System: Indian Railways station
- Owner: Indian Railways
- Operator: South East Central Railways
- Line: Gevra Road–Champa line
- Platforms: 3
- Tracks: 3 (double electrified broad gauge)
- Connections: Auto stand

Construction
- Structure type: Standard (on-ground station)
- Parking: No
- Cycle facilities: No

Other information
- Status: Functioning
- Station code: GAD
- Fare zone: South East Central Railway zone, Bilaspur railway division

History
- Opened: 2013
Location
- Location within Chhattisgarh Location within India

Gevra Road railway station is a small terminal railway station in Korba district, Chhattisgarh, India. Its code is GAD. It serves the Korba Coalfield area. The station consists of 3 platforms. The platform is not well sheltered. It lacks many facilities such as water and sanitation.

== Major trains ==
- Bilaspur–Gevra Passenger (unreserved)
- Bilaspur–Gevra Road MEMU
- Raipur–Gevra Road MEMU
- Raipur–Gevra Road Passenger (unreserved)
- Shivnath Express
- Chhattisgarh Express
- Hasdeo Antyodaya Express (only from 24/01/2019 – 02/02/2019)(now discontinued)
