= Korba railway station =

Railway station in Chhattisgarh

Korba
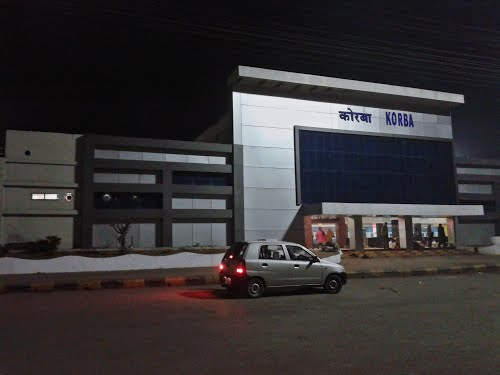

General information
- Location: Old Bus Stand Road, Sitamani, Korba, Chhattisgarh; India
- Coordinates: 22.2015°N 82.4246°E
- Elevation: 286 metres (938 ft)
- System: Indian Railways station
- Owner: Indian Railways
- Operator: South East Central Railway
- Line: Gevra Road-Champa line
- Platforms: 3
- Tracks: 8
- Connections: Auto stand

Construction
- Structure type: Standard (on-ground station)
- Parking: Yes
- Cycle facilities: Yes

Other information
- Status: Functioning
- Station code: KRBA
- Zone(s): South East Central Railway
- Division(s): Bilaspur

Passengers
- 19000 Daily
Location
- Location within India Location within Chhattisgarh

Korba railway station serves Korba, Chhattisgarh, India. It has 3 platforms and operated by South East Central Railway's Bilaspur railway division.

== Major trains ==
- Gevra Road–Raipur Passenger
- Wainganga Superfast Express
- Thiruvananthpuram–Korba Express
- Korba–Raipur MEMU
- Gevra Road–Bilaspur Passenger
- Gevra Road–Bilaspur MEMU
- Korba–Visakhapatnam Express
- Gevra Road–Raipur MEMU
- Shivnath Express
- Hasdeo Antyodaya Express
- Chhattisgarh Express
