= Nagpur railway division =

Nagpur railway division may refer to:

- Nagpur CR railway division
- Nagpur SEC railway division
