= Bhilai railway station =

Railway station in Chhattisgarh

Bhilai Railway Station
- Indian Railways logo

General information
- Location: Bhilai, Durg district, Chhattisgarh; India
- Coordinates: 21.2030°N 81.4206°E
- Elevation: 309 m (1,014 ft)
- System: Express train and Passenger train station
- Owner: Indian Railways
- Operator: South East Central Railways
- Lines: Dalli Rajhara–Bhilai line, Bilaspur–Nagpur section of Howrah–Nagpur–Mumbai line
- Platforms: 4
- Tracks: 7 5 ft 6 in (1,676 mm) broad gauge

Construction
- Structure type: Standard (on ground station)
- Parking: Yes
- Accessible: Available

Other information
- Status: Functioning
- Station code: BIA
- Zone(s): South East Central Railway zone
- Division(s): Raipur

History
- Opened: 14th May 1958; 68 years ago
- Electrified: 1970–71
- Former names: Bengal Nagpur Railway
Location
- Location within Chhattisgarh Location within India

Bhilai Railway Station (station code:- BIA) is located in Durg district, Chhattisgarh state (India). It serves Durg, Bhilai Nagar & Bhilai Power House and adjoining areas. Bhilai railway station is a part of South East Central Railway Zone. It is also one of the most prominent and important station on Howrah–Nagpur–Mumbai line. It is an 'A' grade station of Indian Railways in terms of passenger services.

== History ==
Bhilai railway station started its functioning in 1891. Initially, Bhilai was the part of Bengal Nagpur Railway. The Nagpur–Asansol main line of Bengal Nagpur Railway which came up in 1891 covered Durg station for the first time. The cross-country Howrah–Nagpur–Mumbai line, opened in 1890, was the second long route which passed through Bhilai railway station.

Bhilai Steel Plant, inaugurated on 4 February 1959, enhanced the importance of Bhilai railway station.

== Electric Loco Shed ==
Bhilai Loco Shed holding 300+ electric locomotives. It is holds electric locomotives like WAG-7, WAP-7 & WAG-9. It also held a few WAM-4 locomotives, now scrapped or withdrawn.

It is now holding 110+ WAG-7, 50+ WAP-7 & 150+ WAG-9 locomotives respectively.

== Electrification ==
The Bilaspur–Bhilai and Bhilai–Durg sections were electrified in 1970–71. The Durg station got completely electrified by June 1971, Durg–Paniajob section in 1989–90. The Paniajob–Gondia and Gondia–Bhandara Road sections in 1990–91, Bhandara Road–Tharsa and Tharsa–Nagpur sections in 1991–92.
