= Musra railway station =

Railway station in Chhattisgarh, India

Musra

General information
- Location: india
- Coordinates: 21.1538°N 80.8782°E
- Owner: South East Central Railway
- Line: 5
- Platforms: 5

Other information
- Station code: MUA
- Fare zone: South East Central Railway
Location
- Location within India Location within Chhattisgarh

Musra Railway Station is a railway station in the Mumbai-Howrah rail zone. It is situated in the Rajnandgaon district of Chhattisgarh state. It lies between Dongargarh and Rajnandgaon junctions.
