= Balharshah railway station =

Railway Station in Maharashtra, India

Balharshah

General information
- Location: Dr. Babasaheb Ambedkar ward 25, Ballarpur, Chandrapur district, Maharashtra-442901; India
- Coordinates: 19°50′56″N 79°20′53″E
- Elevation: 188 metres (617 ft)
- System: Express train and Passenger train station
- Owner: Indian Railways
- Operator: Central Railway
- Lines: Delhi–Chennai line Gondia–Nagbhir–Balharshah line
- Platforms: 5
- Tracks: 8

Construction
- Structure type: Standard on ground
- Parking: Yes
- Accessible: Disabled access

Other information
- Status: Functioning
- Station code: BPQ
- Division(s): Nagpur CR

Passengers
- 15000
Location
- Location within Maharashtra

Balharshah railway station (station code: BPQ) is a railway station serving Ballarpur town, in Chandrapur district of Maharashtra state in India. Established by the Nizam's Guaranteed State Railway, it is now under the Nagpur CR railway division of Central Railway Zone of Indian Railways. It is an important junction on New Delhi–Chennai main line of Indian Railways. It is located at 185 m above sea level and has 5 platforms. The Ballarshah–Wardha–Nagpur section was electrified in 1989.

== History ==
With the completion of the Kazipet–Balharshah link in 1929, Chennai was directly linked to Delhi.

- The Gondia–Nagbhir–Nagpur line was opened for traffic in 1908. The Nagbhir–Rajoli line was opened in 1913 and extended up to Chanda Fort.

Work for conversion to 5 ft 6 in (1,676 mm) broad gauge of the 240 km (149 mi) narrow-gauge Gondia–Chanda Fort line started in December 1992. The fourth phase covering Nagbhir–Chanda Fort section was opened on 13 January 1999 and the Chanda Fort–Balharshah section was opened from 2 July 1999.

The Mancherial–Balharshah–Wardha–Nagpur sector was electrified in 1988–89. The Gondia–Nagbhir–Balharshah line was electrified in 2018.

== Amenities ==
The railway station has computerized reservation counters, STD/PCO booth, retiring room, waiting room, vegetarian and non-vegetarian refreshments and book stall.

Preceding station	Indian Railways	Following station
Gondwana Visapur towards New Delhi towards ?	Central Railway zone Delhi–Chennai line	Manikgarh Towards Chennai towards ?
Terminus	South East Central Railway zone Gondia–Nagbhir–Balharshah line	Chanda Fort towards ?
