= Champa Junction railway station =

Railway station in Chhattisgarh

Champa Junction
- Indian Railways logo

General information
- Location: National Highway 200, Agrasen Chowk, Champa, Chhattisgarh; India
- Coordinates: 22.0347°N 82.6652°E
- Elevation: 108 metres (354 ft)
- System: Indian Railways station
- Owner: Indian Railways
- Operator: South East Central Railways
- Lines: Tatanagar–Bilaspur section Gevra Road–Champa line
- Platforms: 3, 4th platform under construction
- Tracks: Triple electrified broad gauge
- Connections: Auto stand

Construction
- Structure type: Standard (on ground station)
- Parking: Yes
- Cycle facilities: No

Other information
- Status: Functioning
- Station code: CPH
- Fare zone: South East Central Railway zone, Bilaspur Division
Location
- Location within India Location within Chhattisgarh

Champa Junction Railway Station is a biggest railway station in Janjgir–Champa district, Chhattisgarh. Its code is CPH. It serves Champa city. The station consists of three platforms. The platforms are well sheltered. It lacks many facilities including water and sanitation. Champa railway station lies on the Tatanagar–Bilaspur section of Howrah–Nagpur–Mumbai line as well as on Gewra–Champa line which connect to Korba.

== Trains ==
- Raigarh–Gondia Jan Shatabdi Express
- Wainganga Superfast Express
- Valsad–Puri Superfast Express
- Hatia–Pune Biweekly Express
- Okha–Howrah Link Express
- Raigarh–H.Nizamuddin Gondwana Express
- Azad Hind Express
- Howrah–Ahmedabad Superfast Express
- Lokmanya Tilak Terminus–Bhubaneswar Superfast Express
- Porbandar–Santragachi Kavi Guru Express
- Shalimar–Bhuj Weekly Superfast Express
- Howrah Mumbai Mail
- Korba Express
- Bilaspur–Patna Weekly SF Express
- Hirakud Express
- Kalinga Utkal Express
- Puri–Jodhpur Express
- Korba–Visakhapatnam Express
- Shalimar–Lokmanya Tilak Terminus Express
- Shalimar–Udaipur City Weekly Express
- South Bihar Express
- Shivnath Express

== Other areas served ==
- Kurda
- Banhindih
- Madwa
- Birgahni
- Korba (only some trains)
