= Dongargarh railway station =

Railway station Chhattisgarh

Coordinates: 21.1854°N 80.7607°E

Dongargarh
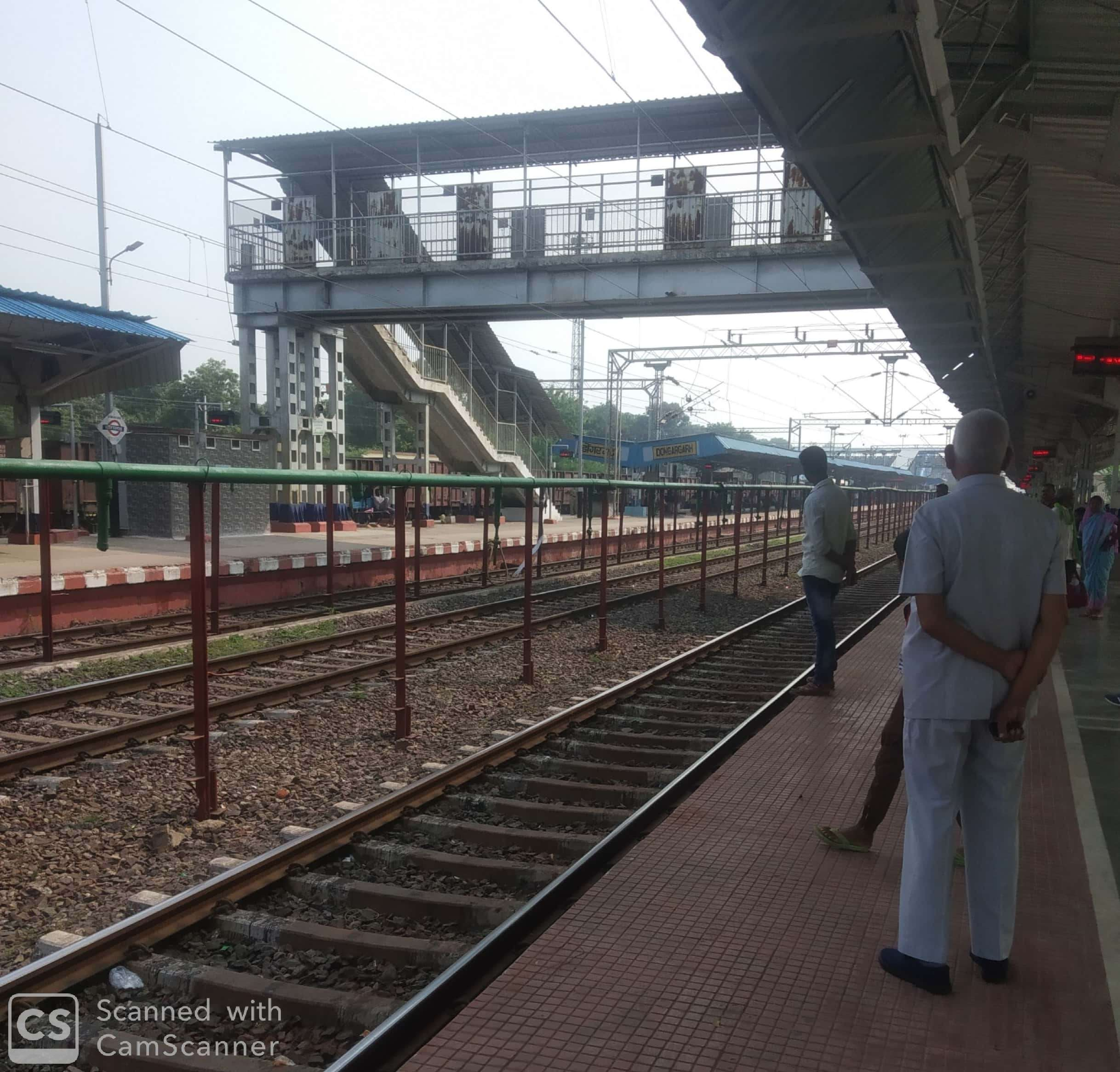

General information
- Location: NH 6, Dongargarh, Rajnandgaon, Chhattisgarh; India
- Elevation: 353 metres (1,158 ft)
- Owner: Indian Railways
- Line: Bilaspur–Nagpur section of Howrah–Nagpur–Mumbai line
- Platforms: 4
- Tracks: 6

Construction
- Parking: Available
- Cycle facilities: Available
- Accessible: Available

Other information
- Station code: DGG
- Fare zone: South East Central Railway zone, Nagpur SEC railway division

Passengers
- 500-600
Location
- Location within Chhattisgarh Location within India

Dongargarh Railway Station (DGG) is a busy railway station in Mumbai–Howrah rail zone in SECR. It is situated in Dongargarh town in Rajnandgaon district of Chhattisgarh state. It is a very important railway junction near Rajnandgaon railway station. It is midway between Jatkanhar and Paniajob. DGG is main station to reach Bambleshwari Temple.

Dongargarh station is 107 kilometers from Raipur Junction railway station, via Bhilai, Durg, and Rajnandgaon

It serves Dongargarh town and Bambleshwari Temple. Dongargarh station is the stop point for all the pilgrims and devotees for visiting Maa Bambleshwari Temple Dongargarh station is 107 kilometers from Raipur railway station, via Bhilai, Durg, and Rajnandgaon. Dongargarh station is the main station connecting as Howrah–Nagpur–Mumbai line managed by SECR of NAGPUR DIVISION, MAHARASHTRA

== Trains ==
- Samata Express
- Wainganga Express
- Azad Hind Express
- Howrah Mumbai Mail
- Puri-Ahmedabad Express
- Howrah-Ahmedabad Superfast Express
- Raigarh-Gondia Jan Shatabdi Express
