= Bilaspur railway division =

Railway division of India

BILASPUR

General information
- Location: Bilaspur Junction railway station India
- Coordinates: 22°03′26″N 82°10′04″E
- Elevation: 292.3 metres (959 ft)
- System: Railway Division
- Owner: Indian Railways
- Operator: SECR
- Lines: Howrah-Nagpur-Mumbai line Bilaspur-Katni line

Other information
- Status: Functioning
- Fare zone: South East Central Railway zone

History
- Opened: 2003; 23 years ago
Location

Bilaspur railway division is one of the three railway divisions under the jurisdiction of South East Central Railway zone of the Indian Railways. This railway division was formed on 1 April 1952 and its headquarters is located at Bilaspur in the state of Chhattisgarh of India.

Nagpur SEC railway division and Raipur railway division are the other two railway divisions under SECR Zone headquartered at Bilaspur.

== List of railway stations and towns ==
The list includes the stations under the Bilaspur railway division and their station category.

Category	No. of stations	Names of stations
A-1; Non-Suburban	1	Bilaspur Junction
A Non-Suburban	3	Raigarh, Champa Junction, Anuppur Junction
B Non-Suburban	3	Korba, Uslapur, Bhatapara
C (Suburban)	2	Akaltara, Gevra Road
D Non-Suburban	-	-
E Non-Suburban	-	-
F Halt	-	-
Total	-	-
