= Itwari Junction railway station =

Railway Station in Maharashtra, India

Netaji Subhash Chandra Bose Itwari (Nagpur)
- Netaji Subhash Chandra Bose Itwari

General information
- Location: Shantinagar Colony, Itwari, Nagpur, Pin-440002, Maharashtra, India
- Coordinates: 21°09′00″N 79°08′00″E
- Elevation: 304 metres (997 ft)
- System: Indian Railways station
- Owner: Indian Railways
- Operator: South East Central Railway (SECR)
- Platforms: 6 + 3(under construction)
- Tracks: 10

Construction
- Structure type: Standard (on-ground station)
- Parking: Available
- Accessible: Yes

Other information
- Status: Functioning
- Station code: NITR
- Zone(s): South East Central Railway (SECR)
- Division(s): Nagpur SEC

History
- Former names: Itwari Junction

Passengers
- 18000
Location
- Location within India Location within Maharashtra

Netaji Subhash Chandra Bose Itwari Railway Station, also known as Itwari Junction railway station, is a Railway Junction Station and Terminus serving the city of Nagpur in Maharashtra state of India.

A few trains also terminate at this station. It is also a narrow-gauge line railway junction. The station code is NITR and is managed by South East Central Railway (SECR). 4 long-distance trains which starts from and terminates at Netaji Subhash Chandra Bose Itwari instead of Nagpur are, Rewa- Itwari Junction Express, Itwari Junction–Tatanagar Express, Bilaspur–Itwari Intercity Superfast Express & Shivnath Express. One new train Rewa-Itwari-Rewa Exp via Jabalpur-Nainpur-Balaghat-Gondia has been introduced. Itwari is among the five small stations which fall within the extended city limits of Nagpur along with Ajni, Kalamna, Kamptee and Khapri.

The Nainpur–Chhindwara–Itwari line of the erstwhile Satpura Railway, one of the latest narrow-gauge lines to be converted to broad-gauge, terminates here.

Further, the area around Itwari railway station is also known as Itwari Locality of Nagpur.

== Renaming Of Itwari Junction ==
The Maharashtra government has decided to change the name of Itwari Junction Railway Station in Nagpur district to ' Netaji Subhash Chandra Bose Itwari Junction ' Railway Station, a Bharatiya Janata Party MLA said on 29-June-2023. In a press release, Nagpur East MLA Krishna Khopde said a notification was issued by the state's Home Department on June 16, which also informed that a no-objection certificate to the name change had been received from the Ministry of Home Affairs on May 23.
