= Nagpur SEC railway division =

Railway division in India

Nagpur

General information
- Location: Netaji Subhash Chandra Bose Itwari Junction Railway Station (NITR); India
- Coordinates: 21°09′00″N 79°08′00″E
- Elevation: 304 metres (997 ft)
- System: Railway Division
- Owner: Indian Railways
- Operator: SECR
- Line: Howrah-Nagpur-Mumbai line
- Connections: Satpura Railway, Nainpur–Chhindwara–Itwari line

Construction
- Parking: Available
- Accessible: Yes

Other information
- Status: Functioning
- Fare zone: South East Central Railway zone

History
- Opened: 1 April 1952
- Rebuilt: 1 April 2003
Location

Nagpur SEC railway division is one of the three railway divisions under the jurisdiction of South East Central Railway zone of the Indian Railways. This railway division was formed on 1 April 1952 and its headquarter is located at Nagpur in the state of Maharashtra in India.

Bilaspur railway division and Raipur railway division are the other two railway divisions under SECR Zone headquartered at Bilaspur.

== List of railway stations and towns ==
The list includes the stations under the SECR Nagpur Railway Division and their station category.

Category of station	No. of stations	Names of stations
A-1	1	Gondia Junction
A	1	Rajnandgaon, Bhandara Road, Netaji Subhash Chandra Bose Itwari Junction
B	-	
C suburban station	-	Dongargarh , Tumsar Road, Tirora
D	-	Chanda Fort, Kamptee
E	-	Arjuni
F halt station	-	-
Total	-	-

Stations closed for Passengers -
