= Korba–Visakhapatnam Express =

Overview
- Service type: Express
- Locale: Andhra Pradesh, Odisha, Chhattisgarh
- First service: 1989
- Current operator: South Coast Railways (SCoR)

Route
- Termini: Visakhapatnam(VSKP); Korba(KRBA)
- Stops: 31
- Distance travelled: 731 km (454 mi)
- Average journey time: 15 hours 20 minutes
- Service frequency: everyday
- Train numbers: 18518 (Visakhapatnam-Korba); 18517 (Korba-Visakhapatnam)

On-board services
- Classes: AC2 tier 2 coaches, AC3 tier 4 coaches, sleeper class
- Seating arrangements: Yes
- Sleeping arrangements: Yes
- Catering facilities: no
- Observation facilities: Large windows
- Baggage facilities: Under the seats

Technical
- Rolling stock: LHB coach
- Operating speed: 60 km/h (37 mph) (average with halts)
Route map
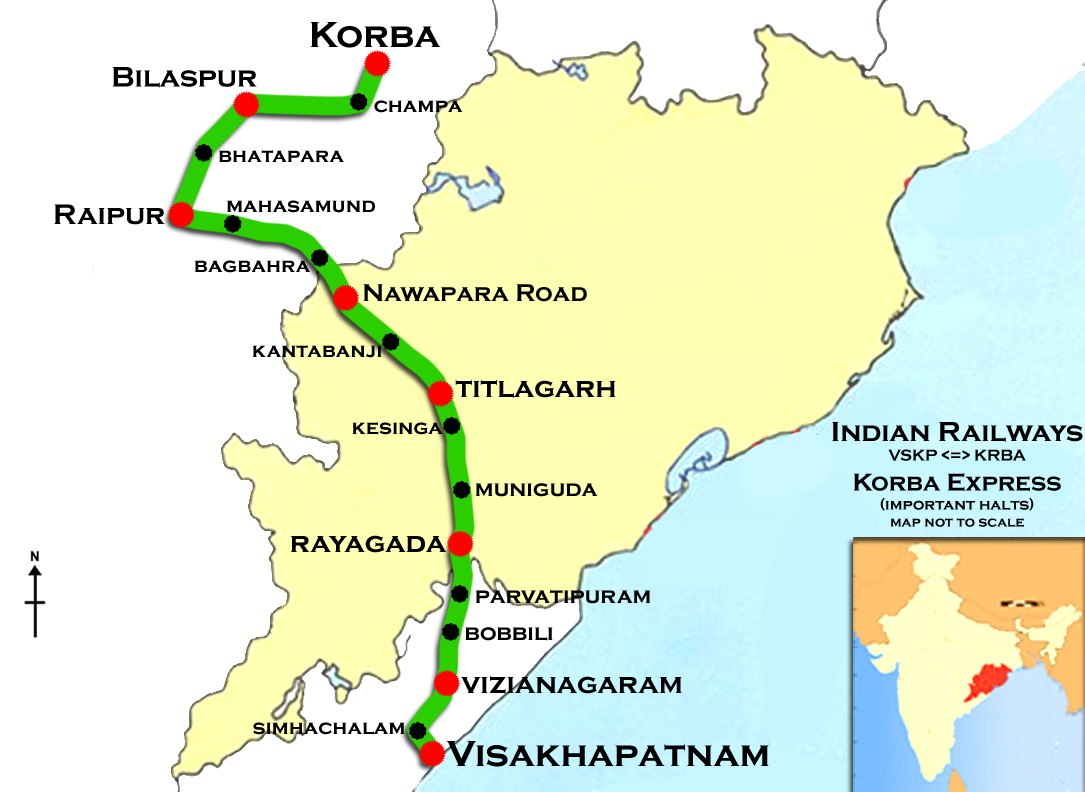

The Korba–Visakhapatnam Express is a daily train in India that runs between Korba in Chhattisgarh and Visakhapatnam in Andhra Pradesh, travelling through much of Odisha. It began to operate in 1989. The route is 731 km long and passes through 31 stations.

== Schedule ==
The express (18517) service departs from Korba (KRBA) at 16:30 every evening, it reaches Visakhapatnam (VSKP) the following morning at 06:20. The 18518 service departs Visakhapatnam at 21:05 and reaches Korba at 11:15 the next morning. This train passes through many important industrial centres and cities like bilaspur, raipur, Rayagada, Vizianagaram, Simhachalam.

The route operates year-round.

== Stops ==
- Visakhapatnam
- Simhachalam
- Vizianagaram
- Bobbili
- Parvatipuram
- Parvatipuram Town
- Rayagada
- Kesinga
- Titlagarh
- Kantabanji
- Harishanker Road
- Khariar Road
- Bagbahra
- Mahasamund
- Raipur
- Tilda Neora
- Bhatapara
- Bilaspur
- Akaltara
- Janjgir Naila
- Champa
- Korba

== Locomotion ==
It is hauled by WAP-7 of visakhapatnam loco shed from Korba to Visakhapatnam and Vice versa
