= Sonua railway station =

Railway Station in Jharkhand

Sonua Railway Station

General information
- Location: Sonua, West Singhbhum district, Jharkhand; India
- Coordinates: 22.5764922°N 85.4645294°E
- Elevation: 288 m (945 ft)
- System: Passenger train station
- Owner: Indian Railways
- Operator: South Eastern Railway
- Line: Howrah–Nagpur–Mumbai line
- Platforms: 2

Construction
- Structure type: Standard (on ground station)

Other information
- Status: Functioning
- Station code: SWR
- Zone(s): South Eastern Railway zone
- Division(s): Chakradharpur railway division

History
- Former names: Bengal Nagpur Railway
Location
- Location within India Location within Jharkhand

Sonua Railway Station is a railway station on Howrah–Nagpur–Mumbai line under Chakradharpur railway division of South Eastern Railway zone. It is situated at Sonua, West Singhbhum district in the Indian state of Jharkhand. It is 21 km (13 mi) from Chakradharpur railway station.
