= Bhatapara =

- City
- Location in Chhattisgarh, India Bhatapara (India)
- Coordinates: 21.73°N 81.93°E
- Country: India
- State: Chhattisgarh
- District: Balodabazar-Bhatapara
- Established: idk
- Elevation: 261 m (856 ft)

Population (2011)
  - Total: 57,537

Languages
  - Official: Hindi, Chhattisgarhi
- Time zone: UTC+5:30 (IST)
- PIN: 493118
- Vehicle registration: CG
- Website: https://www.instagram.com/bhataparaa

Bhatapara is a city and a nagar palika (municipality) in the Baloda Bazar-Bhatapara district of the state of Chhattisgarh, India.

== History ==
During the British rule from 1854 to 1864, Baloda Bazar and Bhatapara were part of the Raipur district. Later, these areas were included in the Bilaspur district in 1864. Bhatapara later became its own district in 1903 after local British Officers relocated their telegraph office there from Simga. Baloda Bazaar would then become a Gram Panchayat in 1949, following the Local Government Act implemented by the newly independent Indian Government.

== Geography ==
Bhatapara, located at 21.73°N 81.93°E., has an average elevation of 261 meters (856 feet), and has a typically humid and warm climate, with 875.27 hectares of forest.

== Demographics ==
According to the 2011 Indian census, Bhatapara City had a population of 57,537. Within the ages of 0-6 were 7,961 children, comprising 13.84% of the total populace. Males constituted 51% of the population, while females represented 49%. In Bhatapara, the male literacy rate is around 88.74%, while the female literacy rate is 72.96%.

In 2011, Bhatapara Municipality encompassed 27 Wards and 12,148 dwellings, to which it supplies basic amenities like water and sewage. It is also authorised to build roads within Municipality limits and impose taxes on properties under its jurisdiction.

== Governance ==
The municipality, split into multiple wards, holds elections every five years. The city has a municipal administrative body, Bhatapara Municipal Council, which supplies water and sewage services for domestic, industrial, and commercial purposes, constructs new highways, collects property taxes, and provides other fundamental services.

== Culture ==
Bhatapara is known for its mill, the Simaria Ghat Mela, and the religious festivals held during the week-long Ram Naam Saptah.

== Transport ==
Bhatapara railway station is on the Howrah-Nagpur-Mumbai line in the South-East Central Railway zone, a major station on the border between Bilaspur and Raipur. It is connected by rail to the nearby stations of Hathband, Tilda, Nipania, Dagori, and Bilha. Bilaspur City is 57 kilometres (35 mi) away and can also be reached by regular transport. Bhatapara is on state highway connecting Nandghat to gidhouri. District headquarters (Baloda-bazar) is 21 kilometres away and Raipur is 85 kilometres away. Raipur-Bilaspur expressway is just 17 kilometres way. Buses are available for nearby towns like Bemetara, Baloda-bazaar, Mungeli, Nawagarh, kharora.

== Notable people ==
- Aman kesharwani indian delegate World youth festival Sochi Russia 2024. Represented india at Russia Indian delegate Aman Kesharwani Represented India and bhatapara at international world youth festival Sochi Russia 2024
