= Raipur railway division =

Railway division of India

Raipur

General information
- Location: Raipur Junction railway station India
- Coordinates: 21°15′23″N 81°37′47″E
- Elevation: 314.350 metres (1,031.33 ft)
- System: Railway Division
- Owner: Indian Railways
- Operator: SECR
- Line: Howrah-Nagpur-Mumbai line

Other information
- Status: Functioning
- Fare zone: South East Central Railway zone

History
- Opened: 2003; 23 years ago
Location

Raipur railway division is one of the three railway divisions under the jurisdiction of South East Central Railway zone of the Indian Railways. This railway division was formed on 1 April 2003 and its headquarter is located at Raipur in the state of Chhattisgarh of India.

Nagpur SEC railway division and Bilaspur railway division are the other two railway divisions under SECR Zone headquartered at Bilaspur.

== List of railway stations and towns ==
The list includes the stations under the Raipur railway division and their station category.

Category of station	No. of stations	Names of stations
A-1	2	Raipur Junction, Durg Junction
A	5	Bhilai Power House, Bhatapara, Bhilai
B	-	-
C suburban station	-	-
D	-	-
E	-	-
F halt station	-	-
Total	7	-

Stations closed for Passengers -
