= Gondia Junction railway station =

Indian junction railway station serving Gondia in Maharashtra

Gondia Junction
- Indian Railways logo

General information
- Location: Gondia, Gondia district, Maharashtra; India
- Coordinates: 21°27′41″N 80°11′32″E
- Elevation: 311.160 metres (1,020.87 ft)
- System: Express train and Passenger train station
- Owner: Indian Railways
- Operator: South East Central Railway zone
- Lines: Bilaspur–Nagpur section Howrah–Nagpur–Mumbai line Jabalpur–Nainpur–Balaghat–Gondia–Arjuni Morgaon–Nagbhir–Balharshah line
- Platforms: 7
- Tracks: 10 broad gauge 1,676 mm (5 ft 6 in)

Construction
- Structure type: At ground
- Parking: Available
- Cycle facilities: Available
- Accessible: Disabled access

Other information
- Status: Functioning
- Station code: G
- Zone(s): South East Central Railway Zone
- Division(s): Nagpur SEC

History
- Opened: 1880
- Rebuilt: Yes

Passengers
- 2,31,624: 29,302 (2010–20)
Location
- Location within Maharashtra

Gondia Junction (station code: G) serves Gondia in Gondia district in the Indian state of Maharashtra. It is one of the important railway stations in India of South East central railways zone railways. This station is India's third and first in Vidarbha to get mist cooling system.Its falls under nagpur division

== History ==
The Nagpur Chhattisgarh Railway started construction of the 240 km (149 mi) Nagpur–Rajnandgaon section in 1878, after surveys were started in 1871. The Nagpur–Tumsar Road section was opened in April 1880 and the Tumsar Road–Rajnandgaon section in December 1880.

The Bengal Nagpur Railway was formed in 1887 for the purpose of upgrading the Nagpur Chhattisgarh Railway and then extending it via Bilaspur to Asansol. The Bengal Nagpur Railway main line from Nagpur to Asansol, on the Howrah–Delhi main line, was opened for goods traffic on 1 February 1891.

The Gondia–Nagbhir–Nagpur line was opened for traffic in 1908.

The Gondia–Nainpur line of the Satpura Railway was opened on 13 April 1903.

=== Gauge conversion ===
Work for conversion to 5 ft 6 in (1,676 mm) broad gauge of the 240 km (149 mi) narrow-gauge Gondia–Chanda Fort line started in December 1992. The first phase covering Gondia–Wadsa section was inaugurated on 25 September 1994. The second phase covering the Wadsa–Nagbhir section was opened on 20 February 1997. The fourth phase covering Nagbhir–Chanda Fort section was opened on 13 January 1999 and the Chandafort–Balharshah section was operated from 2 July 1999.

The Gondia–Balaghat narrow-gauge section was closed from January 2003 for conversion to broad gauge. It was opened for traffic on 6 September 2005. The route from Balaghat to Katangi was converted from narrow gauge to broad gauge in 2010 and the route from Katangi to Tirodi is now under conversion. The Gondia–Jabalpur gauge conversion project is an approved project.

=== Electrification ===
The Paniajob–Gondia and Gondia–Bhandara Road sections were electrified in 1990–91. The Gondia–Nagbhid–Balharshah section was electrified in 2018.

== Jabalpur link ==
The Gondia–Jabalpur line has already been upgraded to 5 ft 6 in (1,676 mm) broad gauge and it is single line electrified section.This is the shortest route for trains going from Allahabad/Katni side to Chennai/Hyderabad/Bengaluru side and vice versa will get a cut-down reduced distance by around 250 km. Gondia will become a meeting point of the east–west and north–south cross-country routes.

== See also ==
Mumbai Central railway station

Preceding station	Indian Railways	Following station
Gudma towards ?	South East Central Railway zone Bilaspur–Nagpur section of Howrah–Nagpur–Mumbai line	Gangajhari towards ?
Terminus	South East Central Railway zone Gondia–Balharshah link	Gankhera Halt towards ?
Terminus	South East Central Railway zone Gondia–Balaghat branch line	Nagaradham towards ?
