= Rajnandgaon railway station =

Railway station Chhattisgarh

Rajnandgaon राजनंदगांव
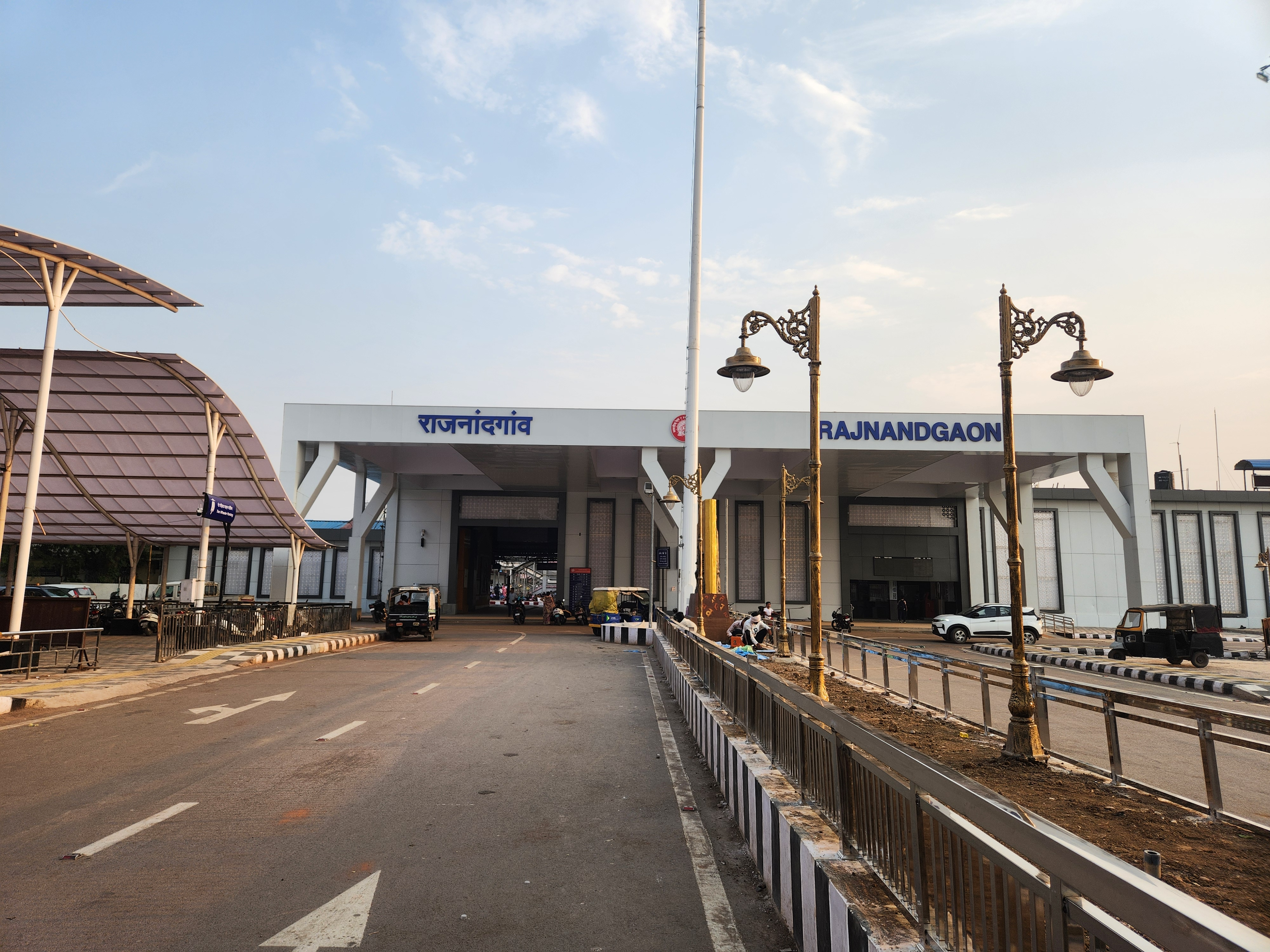

General information
- Location: Rajnandgaon, Rajnandgaon district, Chhattisgarh; India
- Coordinates: 21°06′02″N 81°02′19″E
- Elevation: 307 metres (1,007 ft)
- System: Indian Railways station
- Line: Bilaspur–Nagpur section of Howrah–Nagpur–Mumbai line
- Platforms: 4

Construction
- Structure type: At ground
- Parking: Available (paid)

Other information
- Status: Active
- Station code: RJN
- Zone(s): South East Central Railway
- Division(s): Nagpur

History
- Opened: 1880
- Electrified: 1934–45
Location
- Location within Chhattisgarh Location within India

Rajnandgaon Railway Station serves Rajnandgaon in Rajnandgaon district in the Indian state of Chhattisgarh.

== History ==
The Nagpur Chhattisgarh Railway started construction of the 240 km (149 mi) Nagpur–Rajnandgaon section in 1878, after surveys were started in 1871. The Nagpur–Tumsar Road section was opened in April 1880 and the Tumsar Road–Rajnandgaon section in December 1880.

The Bengal Nagpur Railway was formed in 1887 for the purpose of upgrading the Nagpur Chhattisgarh Railway and then extending it via Bilaspur to Asansol. The Bengal Nagpur Railway main line from Nagpur to Asansol, on the Howrah–Delhi main line, was opened for goods traffic on 1 February 1891.

The cross country Howrah–Nagpur–Mumbai line was opened in 1900.

=== Railway reorganisation ===
The Bengal Nagpur Railway was nationalized in 1944. Eastern Railway was formed on 14 April 1952 with the portion of East Indian Railway Company east of Mughalsarai and the Bengal Nagpur Railway. In 1955, South Eastern Railway was carved out of Eastern Railway. It comprised lines mostly operated by BNR earlier. Amongst the new zones started in April 2003 were East Coast Railway and South East Central Railway. Both these railways were carved out of South Eastern Railway.

== Trains ==
12441/12442 Bilaspur Rajdhani Express passes through this station. It arrives on Sunday and Wednesday at 8:40 from New Delhi, and departs on Monday and Thursday at 16:58 for New Delhi.

Preceding station	Indian Railways	Following station
Murhipar towards ?	South East Central Railway zone Bilaspur–Nagpur section of Howrah–Nagpur–Mumbai line	Musra towards ?
