= Electric Loco Shed, Bhilai =

Loco shed in Chhattisgarh, India

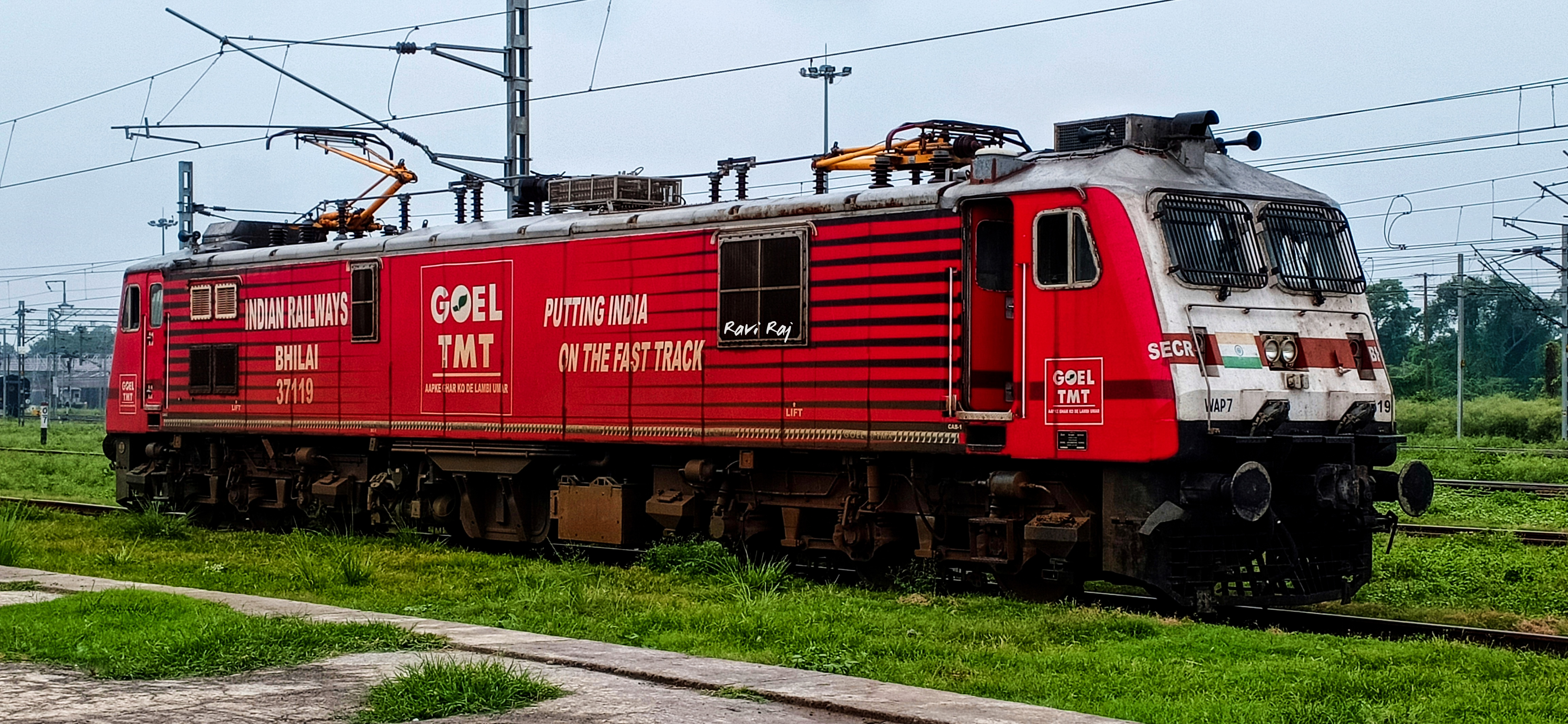
- Bhilai based WAP-7 in Goel TMT bar advertisement livery resting at Katihar.

- Location within Chhattisgarh

Location
- Location: Bhilai, Chhattisgarh
- Coordinates: 21.2030°N 81.4206°E

Characteristics
- Owner: Indian Railways
- Operator: South East Central Railways
- Depot code: BIA
- Type: Engine shed
- Rolling stock: WAP-7; WAG-9; EF12K

History
- Opened: 24 January 1970; 56 years ago
- Former rolling stock: WAM-4; WAG-5; WAG-7

Electric Loco Shed, Bhilai is a motive power depot performing locomotive maintenance and repair facility for electric locomotives of the Indian Railways, located at Bhilai of the South East Central Railway zone in Chhattisgarh, India.

== History ==
New Electric locomotive shed was inaugurated in the 1980s with WAM-4 class. All the WAM-4s of this shed have been retired/withdrawn from service.

== Operations ==
Being one of the two electric loco sheds in South East Central Railway, various major and minor maintenance schedules of electric locomotives are carried out here. It has the sanctioned capacity of 175 engine units. Beyond the operating capacity, this shed houses a total of 299 engine units, including 15 WAP-7, and 290 WAG-9. Like all locomotive sheds, BIA does regular maintenance, overhaul and repair including painting and washing of locomotives. BIA locomotives used to be predominantly the regular links for trains traveling to north and south as well.

== Livery & markings ==
Bhilai WAP-7 locomotive has Goel TMT, GK TMT, Jindal Panther TMT and Shourya TMT advertisements on loco's body side. Bhilai loco shed has its own stencils. It is written in Bold letters in both English and Hindi language.

== Locomotives ==
Serial No.	Locomotive Class	Horsepower	Quantity
1.	WAP-7	6350	26
2.	WAG-9	6120	270
3.	EF12K	12000	43
Total locomotives active as of February 2026			339
