= Bhatapara railway station =

Railway station in Chhattisgarh

Bhatapara
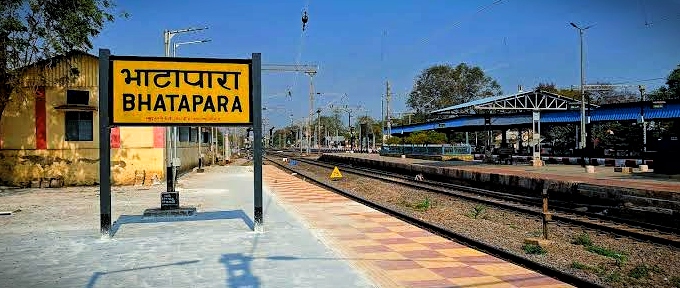
- Bhatapara Railway Station

General information
- Location: Sadar Bazar, Bhatapara, Baloda Bazar district, Chhattisgarh; India
- Coordinates: 21.73°N 81.93°E
- Elevation: 273 metres (896 ft)
- System: Express train and Passenger train station
- Owner: Indian Railways
- Operator: South East Central Railways
- Line: Howrah–Nagpur–Mumbai line
- Platforms: 5
- Tracks: 6

Construction
- Parking: Yes

Other information
- Status: Functioning
- Station code: BYT
- Zone(s): South East Central Railway zone
- Division(s): Raipur
Location
- Location within Chhattisgarh Location within India

Bhatapara Railway Station (station code:- BYT) is a station that is located in Bhatapara, Baloda Bazar district, Chhattisgarh. It falls under South East Central Railway zone's Raipur railway division. It is connected by rail to the nearby stations of Hathband, Tilda, Nipania, Dagori, and Bilha. Bilaspur City is 17 kilometres (11 mi) away and can also be reached by regular transport.
