= Raipur Junction railway station =

Railway junction station in Chhattisgarh, India

Raipur Junction
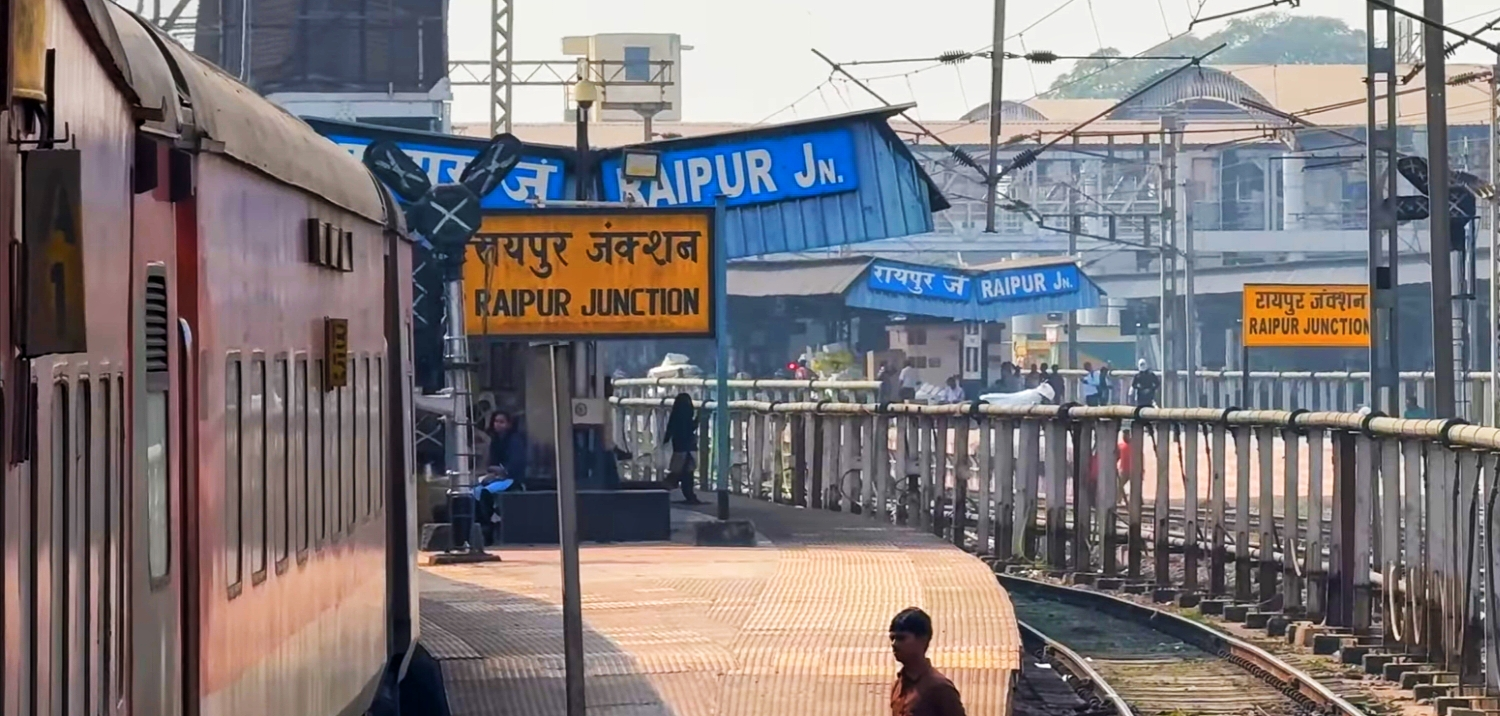
- Raipur junction

General information
- Location: Station Road, Raipur, Chhattisgarh; India
- Coordinates: 21°15′23″N 81°37′47″E
- Elevation: 314.350 metres (1,031.33 ft)
- System: Express train and Passenger train station
- Owner: Indian Railways
- Lines: Bilaspur–Nagpur section of Howrah–Nagpur–Mumbai line and Raipur–Mahasamund–Vizianagaram line
- Platforms: 7 (1,1A,2,3,5,6,7)
- Tracks: 5 ft 6 in (1,676 mm) broad gauge

Construction
- Structure type: Standard (on ground station)
- Parking: Available

Other information
- Status: Functioning
- Station code: R
- Zone(s): South East Central Railway
- Division(s): Raipur railway division

History
- Opened: 1888
- Electrified: 1935–45
- Former names: Bengal Nagpur Railway and South Eastern Railway

Passengers
- 5,50,000
Location
- Location within Chhattisgarh Location within India
- Interactive map

Raipur Junction is the main railway station serving the city of Raipur. It is only few of the railway stations in India which has been given the grade 'A-1' by the Indian Railways and is one of the highest-revenue-earning railway stations in India. This station is one of the prominent stations on the Howrah–Nagpur–Mumbai line. It is also the originating point of the Raipur–Vizianagarm branch line route. Raipur Junction is the busiest railway station in South Eastern Central Railway zone.

== History ==
The Bengal Nagpur Railway was formed in 1887 for the purpose of upgrading the Nagpur Chhattisgarh Railway and then extending it via Bilaspur to Asansol. The Bengal Nagpur Railway main line from Nagpur to Asansol, on the Howrah–Delhi main line, was opened for goods traffic on 1 February 1891.

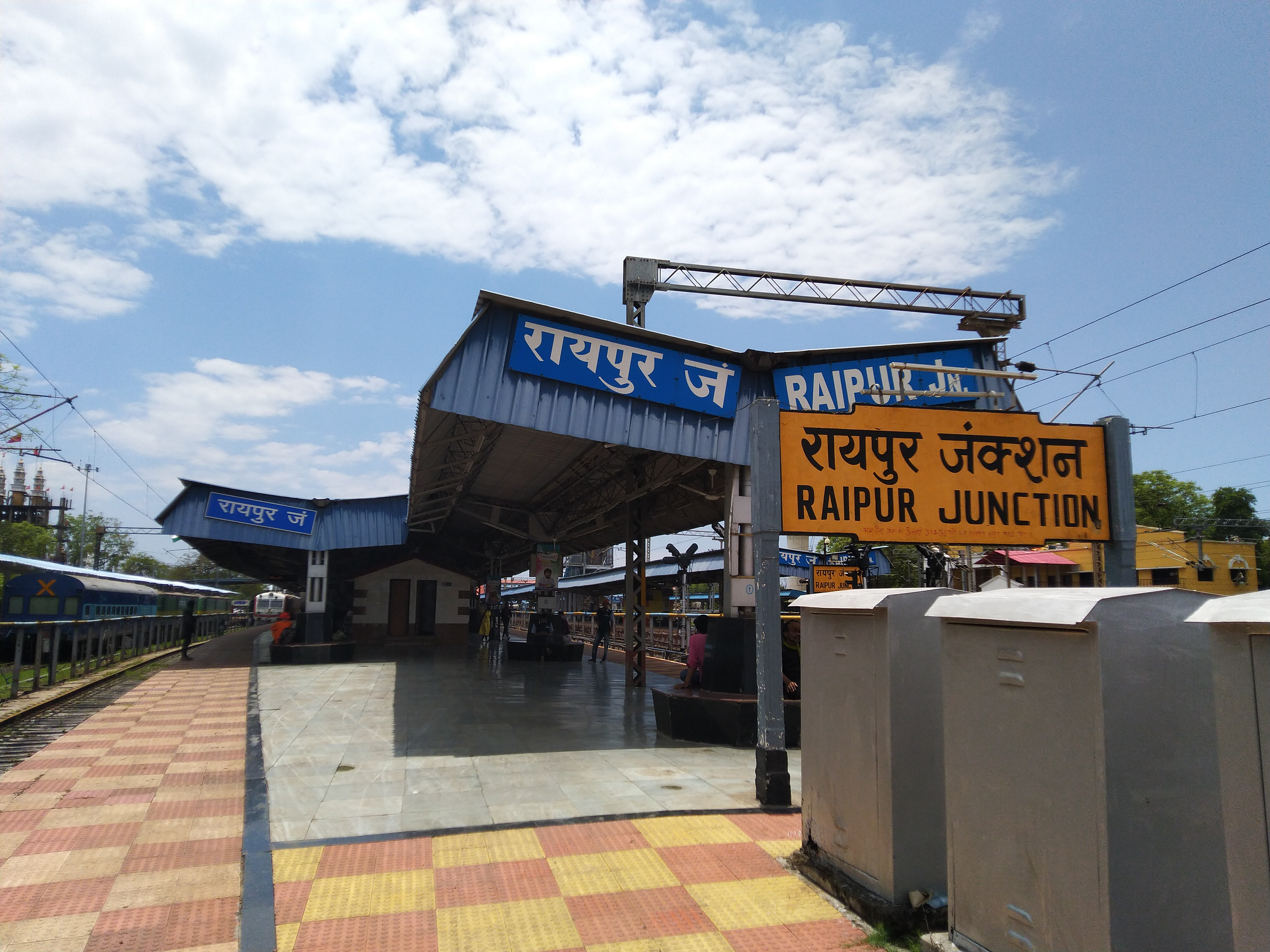
A view of Raipur Junction

The 79 km (49 mi) Vizianagaram–Parvatipuram line was opened in 1908–09 and an extension to Salur was built in 1913. The Parvatipuram–Raipur line was completed in 1931.

== Electrification ==
The Bilaspur–Bhilai section was electrified in 1935–45.

== Diesel Loco Shed, Raipur ==
| Serial No. | Locomotive Class | Horsepower | Quantity |
|---|---|---|---|
| 1. | WDG-4/4D | 4000/4500 | 75 |
| 2. | WAG-7 | 5350 | 150 |
| 3. | WAG-9 | 6120 | 25 |
| 4. | EF-12K | 12000 | 14 |
| Total Locomotives Active as of February 2026 | | | 264 |

| Preceding station | Indian Railways | Following station |
|---|---|---|
| WRS Colony towards ? | South East Central Railway zone Bilaspur–Nagpur section of Howrah–Nagpur–Mumbai line | Saraswatinagar towards ? |
| Terminus | South East Central Railway zone Raipur–Dhamtari section | Telibandha towards ? |
| Terminus | East Coast Railway zone Raipur–Vizianagaram branch line | Mandir Hasaud towards ? |
