= Bilaspur–Nagpur section =

Railway line in India

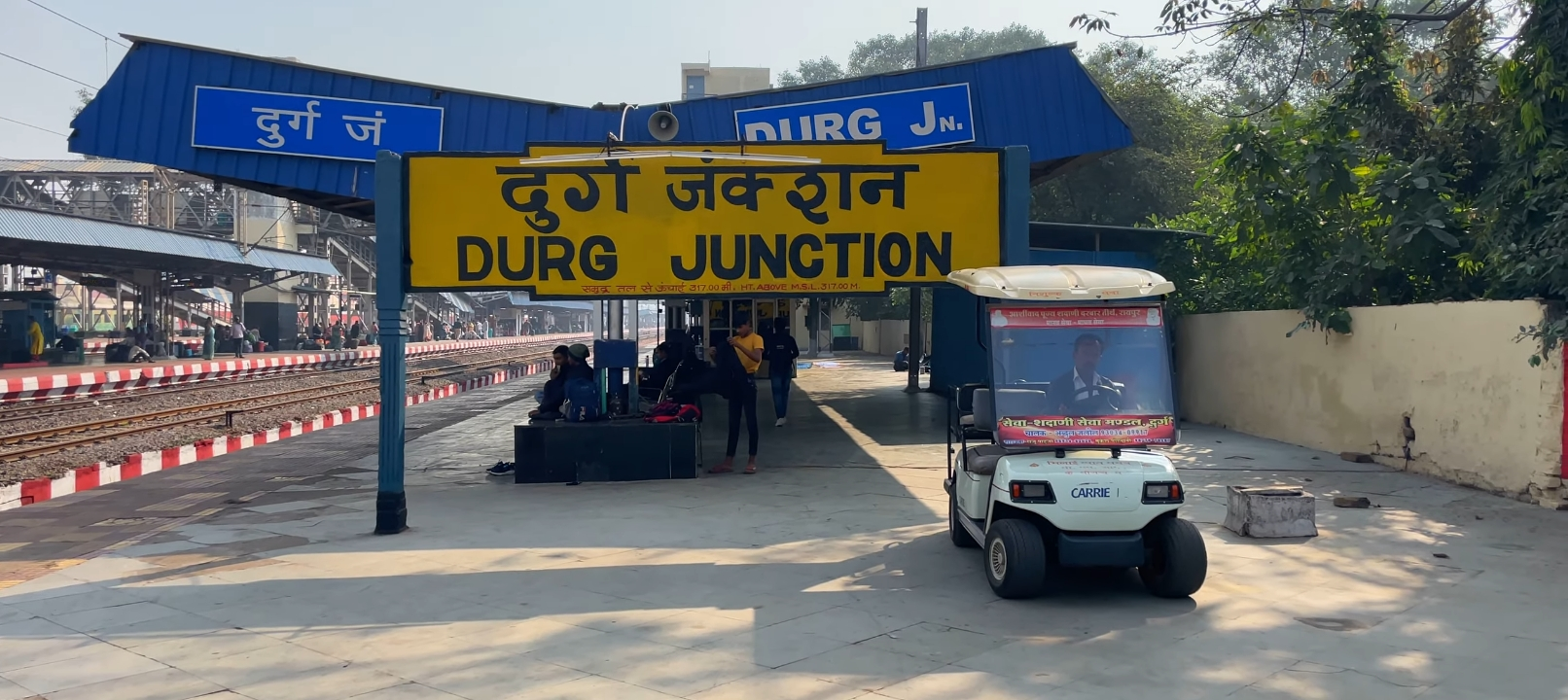
- Durg Junction railway station is an important Railway Station On Bilaspur–Nagpur section

Overview
- Status: Operational
- Owner: Indian Railways
- Locale: Chhattisgarh, Maharashtra, Madhya Pradesh
- Termini: Bilaspur; Nagpur

Service
- System: Electrified
- Services: Howrah–Nagpur–Mumbai line
- Operator: South East Central Railway

History
- Opened: 1891

Technical
- Track length: Main line: 414 km (257 mi); Branch lines: Abhanpur–Rajim : 17 km (11 mi); Kendri–Dhamtari : 68 km (42 mi); Durg–Dalli Rajhara: 87 km (54 mi); Gondia–Balaghat–Katangi: 88 km (55 mi); Tumsar Road–Tirodi: 48 km (30 mi); Gondia–Nagbhir–Balharshah: 252 km (157 mi); Nagpur–Nagbhir : 110 km (68 mi); Kanhan–Ramtek: 23 km (14 mi); Nagpur–Chhindwara : 110 km (68 mi); Chhindwara–Amla: 115 km (71 mi)
- Number of tracks: Main line: 3 tracks between Bilaspur to Rajnandgaon and 2 tracks between Rajnandgaon to Nagpur
- Track gauge: 5 ft 6 in (1,676 mm) broad gauge
- Electrification: Yes
- Operating speed: Main line: up to 130 km/h

The Bilaspur–Nagpur section is part of the Howrah–Nagpur–Mumbai line and connects Bilaspur in the Indian state of Chhattisgarh and Nagpur in Maharashtra. Part of one of the major trunk lines in the country, it passes through a forested plateau region interspersed with fertile valleys.

== History ==
The first train in India travelled from Mumbai to Thane on 16 April 1853. By May 1854, Great Indian Peninsula Railway's Bombay–Thane line was extended to Kalyan. Bhusawal station was set up in 1860 and in 1867 the GIPR branch line was extended to Nagpur. The Nagpur Chhattisgarh Railway started construction of the 240 km (149 mi) metre gauge (soon converted to broad gauge) Nagpur–Rajnandgaon section in 1878, after surveys were started in 1871. The Nagpur–Tumsar Road section was opened in April 1880 and the Tumsar Road–Rajnandgaon section in December 1880.

The Howrah–Allahabad–Mumbai line, a joint effort of Great Indian Peninsula Railway and East Indian Railway Company came up in 1870. The Bengal Nagpur Railway was formed in 1887 for the purpose of upgrading the Nagpur Chhattisgarh Railway and then extending it via Bilaspur to Asansol, in order to develop a shorter Howrah–Mumbai route than the one via Allahabad. The Bengal Nagpur Railway main line from Nagpur to Asansol, on the Howrah–Delhi main line, was opened for goods traffic on 1 February 1891.

A narrow-gauge branch line was constructed from Raipur to Dhamtari, and from Abhanpur another branch line goes to Rajim. It was opened in 1900. The Gondia–Nagbhir–Nagpur line was opened for traffic in 1908. The Nagbhir–Rajoli line was opened in 1913 and extended up to Chanda. The Bhilai–Dalli Rajhara line mainly for iron ore transportation was opened in 1958. Bhilai Steel Plant was opened in 1959.

The Bengal Nagpur Railway was nationalized in 1944.Eastern Railway was formed on 14 April 1952 with the portion of East Indian Railway Company east of Mughalsarai and the Bengal Nagpur Railway. In 1955, South Eastern Railway was carved out of Eastern Railway. It comprised lines mostly operated by BNR earlier. Amongst the new zones started in April 2003 were East Coast Railway and South East Central Railway. Both these railways were carved out of South Eastern Railway.

== Gauge conversion ==
Work for conversion to 5 ft 6 in (1,676 mm) broad gauge of the 240 km (149 mi) narrow-gauge Gondia–Chanda Fort line started in December 1992, Gondia–Wadsa section was inaugurated on 25 September 1994. Wadsa–Nagbhir section was opened on 20 February 1997, Nagbhir–Chanda Fort section was opened on 13 January 1999 and the Chanda Fort–Ballarshah section was operated from 2 July 1999.

The Gondia–Balaghat broad-gauge section was opened for traffic on 6 September 2005. The Balaghat–Katangi section was converted to broad gauge in 2010.

The gauge conversions are under process for 147 km (91 mi)-long Nagpur–Chhindwara section, the 110 km (68 mi)-long Jabalpur–Nainpur section, the 180 km (112 mi)-long Chhindwara–Nainpur–Mandla section, the Nainpur–Balaghat section and 110 km (68 mi)-long Nagpur–Nagbhir section.

== Electrification ==
The entire main line is electrified. The Bilaspur–Bhilai and Bhilai–Durg sections were electrified in 1970–71, Durg–Paniajob section in 1989–90. The Paniajob–Gondia and Gondia–Bhandara Road sections in 1990–91, Bhandara Road–Tharsa and Tharsa–Nagpur sections in 1991–92. The Amla–Chhindwara section was electrified in 2017 and Balharshah–Chanda Fort–Gondia section was electrified in 2018. Other lines will be electrified once converted to broad gauge.

== Speed limits ==
The entire Howrah–Nagpur–Mumbai line is planned to be upgraded into a "Group A" line which would let it take speeds up to 160 km/h.

== Passenger movement ==
Bilaspur, Raipur, Durg and Nagpur on this line are amongst the top hundred booking stations of Indian Railway. About 1 to 1.2 million passengers travel from here.

== Narrow-gauge rail museum ==
A Narrow-Gauge Rail Museum was inaugurated at Nagpur on 14 December 2002. It was accorded the status at par with National Rail Museum, New Delhi.
