= Bilaspur Junction railway station =

Railway station in Chhattisgarh

BILASPUR JUNCTION

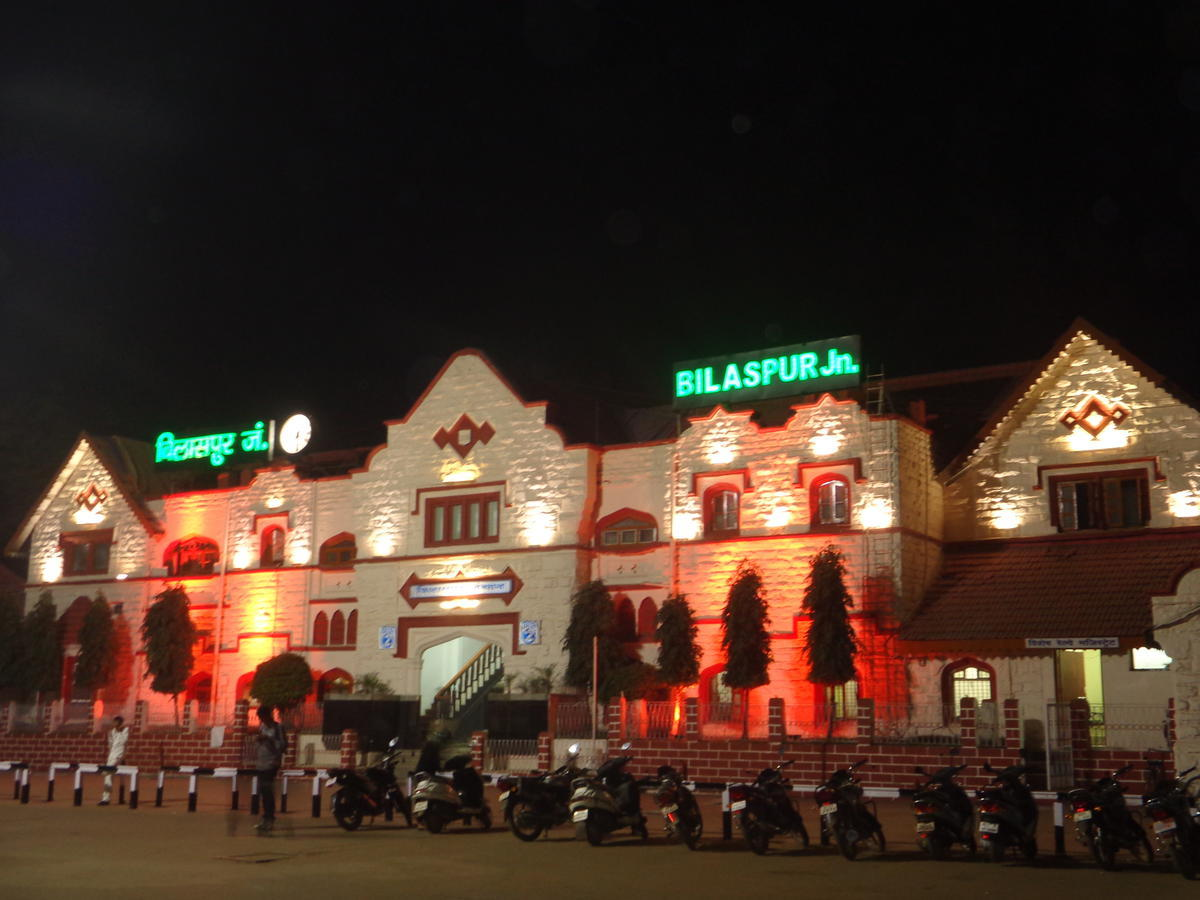
- Bilaspur Junction

General information
- Location: Ahead budhwari bazar, Bilaspur, Chhattisgarh; India
- Coordinates: 22°03′26″N 82°10′04″E
- Elevation: 292.300 metres (958.99 ft)
- System: Regional rail, Light rail & Goods railway
- Owner: Indian Railways
- Operator: South East Central Railways
- Lines: Howrah–Nagpur–Mumbai line Bilaspur–Katni line
- Platforms: 8 (5 island platforms + 3 Terminus)+ 2 under construction)
- Tracks: 18
- Connections: Wifi enabled IR station, Zonal Headquarter

Construction
- Structure type: Standard (on ground station)
- Parking: Yes
- Accessible: Available

Other information
- Status: Operating
- Station code: BSP
- Zone(s): South East Central Railway zone
- Division(s): Bilaspur railway division

History
- Opened: 1889; 137 years ago
- Electrified: 1969–70
- Former names: Bengal Nagpur Railway

Passengers
- 450000 (approx)
Location
- Location within India Location within Chhattisgarh
- Interactive map of Bilaspur Junction

Bilaspur Junction Railway Station (station code BSP), located in the Indian state of Chhattisgarh, serves Bilaspur in Bilaspur district.

== History ==
The railway station came up in 1889 with the opening of Rajnandgaon to Bilaspur extension of erstwhile Nagpur Chhattisgarh Railway taken over by Bengal Nagpur Railway and construction of the Nagpur–Asansol main line of Bengal Nagpur Railway, which opened in 1891. The station building was constructed in 1890. It became a station on the crosscountry Howrah–Nagpur–Mumbai line in 1900.

=== Electrification ===
The Rourkela–Bilaspur section was electrified in 1969–70 while Bilaspur–Nagpur in 1976–77 and Bilaspur–Katni in 1981.

== Zonal HQ ==
Bilaspur is headquarters of South East Central Railway.

== Electric Loco Shed, Bilaspur ==
Bilaspur Electric Loco Shed was commissioned on 2018.

| Serial No. | Locomotive Class | Horsepower | Quantity |
|---|---|---|---|
| 1. | WAG-9 | 6120 | 236 |
| 2. | EF12K | 12000 | 28 |
| Total Locomotives Active as of February 2026 | | | 264 |

== Busy station ==
Bilaspur is amongst the top hundred booking stations of Indian Railway. as about 340 passenger trains and goods trains passes every day.

== Important trains ==
- 18477/ Kalinga Utkal Express
- 12441/ Bilaspur Rajdhani Express
- 12130/ Azad Hind Express
- 18237/ Chhattisgarh Express
- 12823/ Chhattisgarh Sampark Kranti Superfast Express
- 12102/ Jnaneswari Express
- 12810/ Howrah–Mumbai Mail
- 12855/ Bilaspur–Itwari Intercity Superfast Express
- 18029/ Shalimar–Lokmanya Tilak Terminus Express
- 22815/ Ernakulam–Bilaspur Express
- 12851/ Bilaspur–Chennai Central Superfast Express
- 22619/ Tirunelveli–Bilaspur Express
- 20826/ Bilaspur–Nagpur Vande Bharat Express

== Achievements ==
Bilaspur Junction railway station has many achievements:

- Bilaspur Junction is third-cleanest railway station and cleanest zonal headquarter railway station of India. (Survey 2015–16)
- Here is fifth-longest railway platform in Bilaspur Junction.

| Preceding station | Indian Railways | Following station |
|---|---|---|
| Gatora towards ? | South East Central Railway zone Tatanagar–Bilaspur section of Howrah–Nagpur–Mumbai line | Dadhapara towards ? |
| Uslapur towards ? | South East Central Railway zone Katni–Bilaspur branch line | Terminus |
