= South East Central Railway zone =

One of the eighteen Railway Zones in India

South East Central Railway

Overview
- Headquarters: Bilaspur Junction
- Locale: Chhattisgarh; Madhya Pradesh; Maharashtra; Odisha
- Dates of operation: 2003; 23 years ago–
- Predecessor: South Eastern Railway Zone

Technical
- Track gauge: Broad Gauge
- Electrification: Yes

Other
- Website: www.secr.indianrailways.gov.in

The South East Central Railway (abbreviated SECR) is one of the 19 Railway Zones in India. The zonal headquarters are located at Bilaspur and comprises the Bilaspur, Nagpur SEC and Raipur.

== History ==
This Zone was formerly part of the South Eastern Railway. It was inaugurated on 20 September 1998 and dedicated to the nation on 3 April 2003.

== Divisions ==
- Bilaspur Division
- Raipur Division
- Nagpur SECR Division

== Infrastructure ==
Bilaspur Railway Station is a regional hub for the system. It is the busiest junction in Chhattisgarh and the fourth-busiest in Central India for passenger trains. It is one of busiest junctions of Indian Railway due to heavy freight movements of coal, steel, cement from East India to West & North India. The junction is upgraded to handle quadruple (4th line) and triple (3rd line) between Jharsuguda - Bilaspur - Durg and Bilaspur - Katni.

The zone's major passenger stations are Netaji Subash Chandra Bose Itwari (NITR), Gondia (G), Bhandara Road (BRD), Dongargarh (DGG), Rajnandgaon (RJN), Durg Junction railway station (DURG), Bhilai Power House railway station (BPHB), Bhilai (BIA), Raipur (R), Bhatapara (BYT), Tilda (TLD), Bilaspur (BSP), Gevra Road (GAD), Janjgir Naila (NIA), Champa (CPH), Raigarh (RIG), and Anuppur (APR), most of which lie on the Mumbai-Howrah and Delhi-Katni-Bilaspur main lines. Bilaspur, Gondia, Durg, Anuppur and Raipur are the zone's major junctions. By 2007, SECR had added a third rail line between Durg and Raigarh.

By 2024 fourth railway line between Bilaspur and Jharsuguda will be operational. Fourth railway line between Bilaspur and Durg due to the heavy freight movement was approved in FY23-24 railway budget.

== Loco sheds ==
- Electric Loco Shed, Bhilai
- Electric Loco Shed, Bilaspur
- Electric & Diesel Loco Shed, Raipur
- Diesel Loco Shed, Motibagh (Nagpur)

== See also ==
- Zones and divisions of Indian Railways
- All India Station Masters' Association (AISMA)
