= Jabalpur–Chanda Fort Intercity Superfast Special =

Train in India

Jabalpur–Chanda Fort Intercity Superfast Express

Overview
- Service type: Superfast
- Locale: Madhya Pradesh & Maharashtra
- First service: 8 March 2021; 5 years ago
- Current operator: West Central Railway

Route
- Termini: Jabalpur Junction (JBP); Chanda Fort (CAF)
- Stops: 5
- Distance travelled: 475 km (295 mi)
- Average journey time: 8 hrs 30 mins
- Service frequency: Tri-weekly (Note: Runs thrice in a week for every direction.)
- Train number: 22173 / 22174

On-board services
- Classes: AC Chair Car, Sleeper Class, General Unreserved
- Seating arrangements: Yes
- Sleeping arrangements: Yes
- Auto-rack arrangements: Overhead racks
- Catering facilities: Not available
- Observation facilities: Large windows
- Baggage facilities: No
- Other facilities: Below the seats

Technical
- Rolling stock: ICF coach
- Track gauge: 1,676 mm (5 ft 6 in)
- Operating speed: 56 km/h (35 mph) average including halts.

The 22173 / 22174 Jabalpur–Chanda Fort Intercity Superfast Express is a superfast train of the Indian Railways connecting Jabalpur Junction in Madhya Pradesh and Chanda Fort of Maharashtra. It is currently being operated with 22173/22174 train numbers on a tri-weekly basis.

== Route and halts ==
The important halts of the train are:

- Jabalpur Junction
- Madan Mahal
- Nainpur Junction
- Balaghat Junction
- Gondia Junction
- Chanda Fort

== Coach composition ==
The train has refurbished ICF rake. The train consists of 10 coaches:

- 1 AC Chair Car
- 1 Sleeper coach
- 8 General coaches

== Traction ==
As the route is electrified, a WAP-4 pulls the train to its destination.
