= Satpura Express =

Overview
- Service type: Passenger
- Locale: Madhya Pradesh
- Last service: 2015

Route
- Termini: Jabalpur; Balaghat
- Distance travelled: 187 kilometers 116 miles
- Train number(s): 10001 / 10002

On-board services
- Class(es): First Class (Non-ac) And unreserved class
- Seating arrangements: Yes
- Sleeping arrangements: No
- Auto-rack arrangements: No
- Catering facilities: No pantry car
- Observation facilities: No
- Entertainment facilities: No
- Baggage facilities: Yes

Technical
- Rolling stock: Standard Indian Railways narrow-gauge coaches
- Track gauge: Narrow gauge
- Operating speed: 43.2 kilometres per hour (26.8 mph)

The Satpura Express was a daily express train which ran between Jabalpur Junction railway station of Jabalpur in Madhya Pradesh to another city of the same state, Balaghat Junction.

== History ==
The Satpura Express is a showpiece of the Satpura Railway. It used to travel a run of 187 kilometres (116 mi) from Jabalpur to Balaghat in a little less than seven hours. Earlier this train ran from Jabalpur Junction to Gondia; with a Steam Loco of ZE Class but then a diesel locomotive of ZDM Class is replaced and have much more power. However, after the gauge conversion the section from Gondia to Balaghat and Katangi is converted to broad gauge and the train was limited up to Balaghat.

== Number and nomenclature ==
The number provided for the train is:

- 10001 – Balaghat Jn. to Jabalpur Jn.
- 10002 – Jabalpur Jn. to Balaghat Jn.

The name Satpura signifies the hill valley range of Satpura in Madhya Pradesh.

== Arrival and departure Info ==
- Train no.10001 departs from Balaghat Jn. daily at 12.45 hrs. reaching Jabalpur Jn. at 19.35 hrs.
- Train no.10002 departs from Jabalpur Jn. daily at 05.30 hrs. reaching Balaghat Jn. at 12.10 hrs.

== Route and halts ==
The Jabalpur–Balaghat–Jabalpur Satpura Express runs daily connecting four districts of Madhya Pradesh: Jabalpur, Seoni, Mandla and Balaghat. The stations en route are Balaghat Jn., Samnapur, Charegaon, Lamta, Nagarwara, Nainpur Jn., Pindrai, Ghansor, Shikara, Bargi, Howbagh Jabalpur, Jabalpur Jn. Total distance of 187 km.

== Coach composition ==
The train has 10 coaches in which 8 coaches are unreserved and a luggage van and the train has the accommodation of one reserved first class coach with seats for 14 people. This is unique in narrow gauge in India.

== Average speed and frequency ==
The train runs with an average speed of 42 km/hour on daily basis from both the sites

== Trivia ==
- It is one of the oldest trains of Indian Railways
- It is the first train service started in Central India
- This train is the only Express train of Balaghat

== See also ==
- Jabalpur–Ajmer Dayodaya Express
- Jabalpur–Shri Mata Vaishno Devi Katra Durgavati Express
- Jabalpur–Rewa Intercity Express

== Other train ==
Two other pairs of passenger trains run in the old narrow gauge from Jabalpur to Balaghat in the state of Madhya Pradesh, India.
