= Sukrimangela–Jabalpur Passenger =

Train in India

The Sukrimangela–Jabalpur Passenger is an Indian Railways passenger train running between Sukrimangela and Jabalpur on the newly converted Jabalpur–Nainpur line.

== History ==
The train covers the 51-kilometre journey in about 1 hour and 30 minutes. It is the only train currently running in the interior of the Satpura Ranges. Its average speed is 34 kilometres per hour. The JBP WDM-3A loco is in charge of the train. This train shares its rake with Mandovi Express.

== Major stations ==
- Sukrimangela
- Bargi
- Charghat Piparia
- Jamtara Paraswara
- Gwarighat
- Garha Goods Shed
- Madan Mahal
- Jabalpur Junction
