= Balaghat Junction railway station =

Railway station in Madhya Pradesh

Balaghat Junction
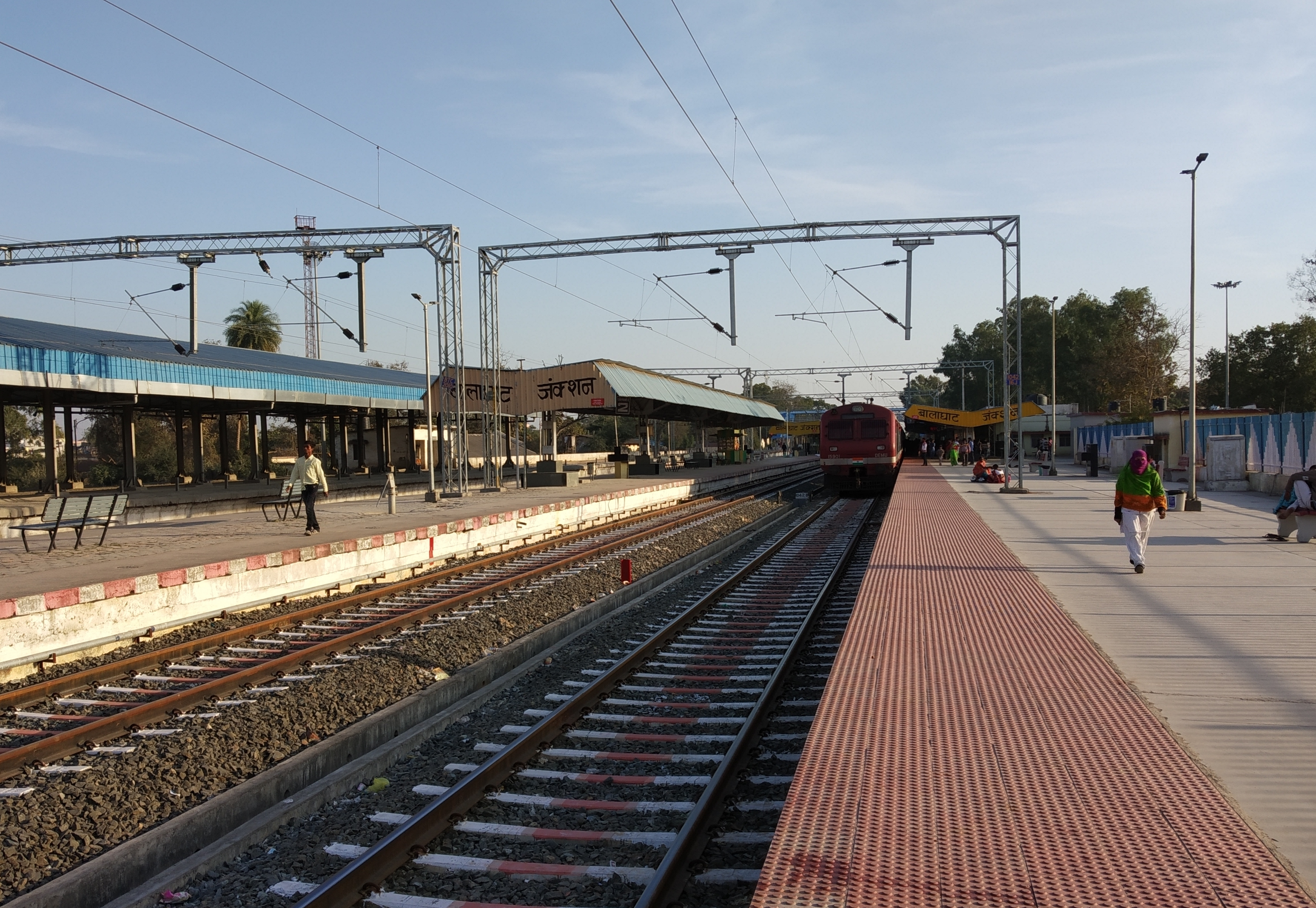
- A DEMU train passes from Balaghat station to Gondia station

General information
- Location: Balaghat, Madhya Pradesh; India
- Coordinates: 21°48′40″N 80°12′01″E
- System: Express train and Passenger train station
- Lines: Jabalpur–Balaghat–Gondia line Balaghat–Tumsar Road line
- Platforms: 4
- Tracks: 5 ft 6 in (1,676 mm) broad gauge

Construction
- Structure type: Standard (on-ground station)
- Parking: Available

Other information
- Status: Functioning
- Station code: BTC
- Zone(s): South East Central Railway
- Division(s): Nagpur SEC

History
- Opened: 1901
- Former names: Bengal Nagpur Railway / Satpura Railway
Location
- Location within India Location within Madhya Pradesh

Balaghat Junction (station code: BTC) is situated on the Jabalpur–Nainpur–Gondia section of South East Central Railway (earlier called Bengal Nagpur Railway or BNR), in the Indian state of Madhya Pradesh. Rail routes through the junction include routes towards Jabalpur, Gondia, Katangi on the Satpura Railway. The "10001 Satpura Express", a narrow-gauge train, was started in 1901 by the British Government and completed 100 years of service in 2001. This train used to hold the unique distinction of operating first-class service on narrow-gauge track; it was the world's fastest narrow-gauge train.

The line was formerly narrow gauge (2 ft 6 in (762 mm)) throughout its entire length, but the section between Balaghat–Gondia was converted to broad gauge in 2005–2006, connecting Balaghat to India's national network for the first time. The remaining work of broad gauge conversion i.e. of Jabalpur–Balaghat section recently got completed along with electrification of entire route. 02389/02390 Gaya–Chennai Central Festival Special became the first passenger train to run after gauge conversion.

The route from Balaghat to Katangi was converted from narrow gauge to broad gauge on 6 May 2010 and the new rail line project from Katangi to Tirodi is under implementation; its length is about 12 km, with a short route to Nagpur from Balaghat via Tumsar. Electrification work of Balaghat–Katangi section is underway. Balaghat also has a branch line towards Bharveli. Mines operated by MOIL Limited in the eastern part of the city use the system to transport manganese ore.

Since the station is not on the main line, people have to depend on Gondia Junction railway station.

== Train Services ==
- 12389/12390 Gaya–Chennai Central Festival Special
- 11754/11753 Rewa–Itwari Special
- 22174/22173 Jabalpur–Chanda Fort Intercity SF Special
1. Balaghat - Katangi -Tirodi
2. Balaghat - Tumsar(Demu 78813-14)
3. Balaghat - Gondia(memu)
4. Balaghat - garha(Jabalpur) 68817-68
5. Balaghat - Jabalpur passenger 51707-08
6. Balaghat - Itwari(NAGPUR) memu 68714-15
7. Kanyakumari - Balaghat -Jabalpur - Banaras 16367-68 Kashi Tamil Sangam Express
8. Rewa-Jabalpur-Balaghat-Nagpur-Hadapsar(Pune) Superfast weekly Express 20151-52.
9. Jabalpur-Balaghat-Gondia-Raipur Intercity daily Express 11701-02.
