= Sukrimangela railway station =

Railway station in India

General information
- Location: Shikara–Dhooma Road, Madhya Pradesh; India
- Coordinates: 22.5869°N 80.3563°E
- Elevation: 425 metres (1,394 ft)
- System: Indian Railways station
- Owner: Indian Railways
- Operator: South East Central Railway
- Platforms: 2
- Tracks: 4 (Construction – gauge conversion – MG/NG to single diesel BG)
- Connections: Auto stand

Construction
- Structure type: Standard (on-ground station)
- Parking: No
- Cycle facilities: No

Other information
- Status: Construction – gauge conversion – MG/NG to single diesel BG
- Station code: SOY
- Zone(s): South East Central Railway
- Division(s): Nagpur railway division
Location

Sukrimangela railway station is a main railway station in Jabalpur district, Madhya Pradesh. Its code is SOY. It serves Mandla city. The station consists of two platforms, neither not well sheltered. It lacks many facilities including water and sanitation. Mandla is served by a narrow-gauge railway from Nainpur, where it connects to the narrow-gauge line between Jabalpur and Gondia. Gauge conversion has already started.

== Major train ==
- Sukrimangela–Jabalpur Passenger
