= Chirai Dongri =

Village in Mandla, Madhya Pradesh, India

- Village
- Location in Madhya Pradesh, India
- Coordinates: 22.41°N 80.28°E
- Country: India
- State: Madhya Pradesh
- District: Mandla district

Chirai Dongri is a village located in Mandla district of Madhya Pradesh state in India.

== Overview ==
Chiraidongri serves as a key entry point for Kanha Tiger Reserve the Khatia Gate—another access point to the park—is located just a short distance away, and there are numerous hotels and rest houses available for the convenience of tourists.

== Transportation ==
Chiraidongri is accessible by both road and rail; the Chiraidongri Railway Station is located on the Mandla-Nainpur route, and the area is also connected by road to Mandla, Nainpur, Seoni, and Jabalpur.

== Population ==
As per Population Census 2011, there are 455 families residing in the village, with population of 1,935 composed of 949 males and 986 females.
