= Kachhpura railway station =

Railway station in Madhya Pradesh, India

General information
- Location: Sanjeevani Nagar, Jabalpur, Madhya Pradesh; India
- Coordinates: 23.1680°N 79.9047°E
- Elevation: 387 metres (1,270 ft)
- System: Indian Railways station
- Owner: Indian Railways
- Operator: West Central Railway
- Line: Jabalpur–Bhusaval section
- Platforms: 1
- Tracks: 3
- Connections: Auto stand

Construction
- Structure type: Standard (on-ground station)
- Parking: No
- Cycle facilities: No

Other information
- Status: Active
- Station code: KEQ
- Zone(s): West Central Railway
- Division(s): Jabalpur

Services
Preceding station	Indian Railways	Following station
Madan Mahal towards ?	West Central Railway zone Jabalpur–Bhusaval section	Bheraghat towards ?
Madan Mahal towards ?	West Central Railway zone Jabalpur–Balaghat–Gondia line	Garha Goods Shed towards ?
Location

Kachhpura railway station is a small goods railway station in Jabalpur district, Madhya Pradesh. Its code is KEQ. It serves Jabalpur city. The station consists of two platforms, neither of which is well sheltered. It lacks many facilities including water and sanitation.
