= Chichpalli railway station =

Railway Station in Maharashtra, India

General information
- Location: Chichpalli, Chandrapur district, Maharashtra; India
- Coordinates: 19°57′58″N 79°26′50″E
- Elevation: 250 metres (820 ft)
- System: Indian Railways station
- Owner: Indian Railways
- Line: Gondia–Nagbhid–Balharshah line
- Platforms: 0
- Tracks: 1

Construction
- Structure type: Standard (on ground station)
- Parking: Available
- Cycle facilities: No

Other information
- Status: Functioning
- Station code: CIP
- Fare zone: South East Central

Services
Preceding station	Indian Railways	Following station
Chanda Fort towards ?	South East Central Railway zone Gondia–Nagbhir–Balharshah line	Kelzar towards ?
Location
- Location within Maharashtra Location within India

Chichpalli railway station (station code: CIP) is a railway station serving Chichpalli village in Chandrapur district in Maharashtra state in India. It is under Nagpur SEC railway division of South East Central Railway Zone of Indian Railways. It is located on Gondia–Nagbhid–Balharshah line of Indian Railways.

It is located at 250 m above sea level and has no platforms. As of 2018, 2 trains stop at this station.

== History ==
The Gondia–Nagbhir–Nagpur line was opened for traffic in 1908. The Nagbhir–Rajoli line was opened in 1913 and extended up to Chanda Fort. Work for conversion to 5 ft 6 in (1,676 mm) broad gauge of the 240 km (149 mi) narrow-gauge Gondia–Chanda Fort line started in December 1992. The fourth phase covering Nagbhir–Chanda Fort section was opened on 13 January 1999 and the Chanda Fort–Balharshah section was opened from 2 July 1999.
