= Mahabodhi Express =

Train in India

Mahabodhi Superfast Express
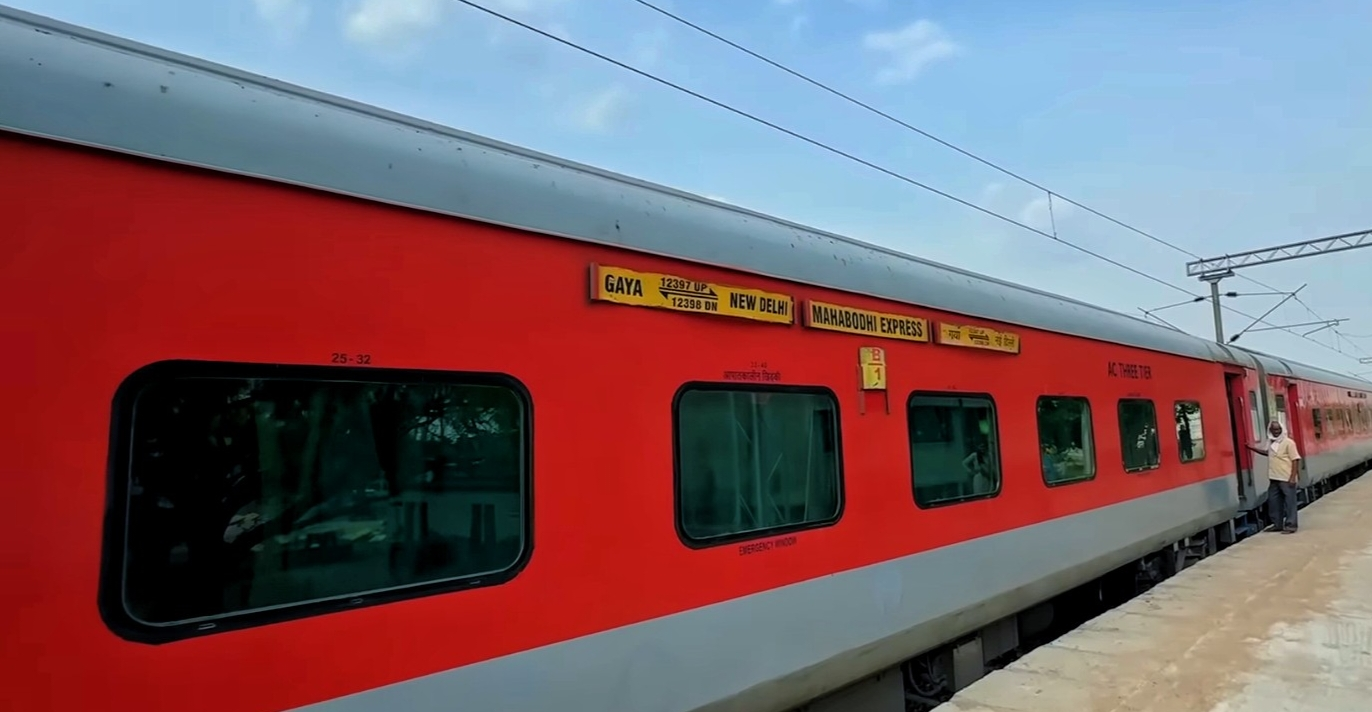
- Mahabodhi Superfast Express At Sasaram Junction railway station

Overview
- Service type: Superfast Express
- Status: Operating
- First service: 24 August 2003; 23 years ago
- Current operator: East Central Railway

Route
- Termini: Gaya Junction (GAYA); New Delhi (NDLS)
- Stops: 14
- Distance travelled: 992 km (616 mi)
- Average journey time: 14 hrs 15 mins
- Service frequency: Daily (Note: Runs everyday for every direction.)
- Train number: 12397 / 12398

On-board services
- Classes: AC 2 Tier, AC 3 Tier, Sleeper Class, General Unreserved
- Seating arrangements: Yes
- Sleeping arrangements: Yes
- Catering facilities: Available
- Observation facilities: Large windows
- Baggage facilities: Available
- Other facilities: Below the seats

Technical
- Rolling stock: LHB coach
- Track gauge: 1,676 mm (5 ft 6 in)
- Operating speed: 70 km/h (43 mph) average including halts.
- Rake sharing: Rake sharing with 12389/12390 Gaya–Chennai Egmore Weekly Superfast Express.

The 12397 / 12398 Mahabodhi Superfast Express is Daily Superfast Express train in India which runs daily from Gaya to New Delhi and vice versa. It was started by Nitish Kumar, making it the direct train between Gaya and New Delhi in 2003.

Its name comes from the Mahabodhi Temple situated at Bodhgaya in Gaya district of Bihar. It is the most popular train for people travelling between Gaya and New Delhi. It is the fastest train in Gaya–Delhi route after Rajdhani Express and maximum speed is 130 km/h. It mainly carries passengers from Gaya Junction, Anugrah Narayan Road, Dehri-on-Sone and Mughalsarai station.

The train now uses LHB coach since 20 April 2013.

== Route & halts ==
- Gaya Junction
- Anugraha Narayan Road
- Dehri-on-Sone
- Sasaram
- Bhabua Road
- Chandauli Majhwar
- Pt. Deen Dayal Upadhyaya Jn.
- Vindhyachal
- Prayagraj
- Kanpur Central
- Aligarh
- New Delhi

== Traction ==
It is hauled by both a Kanpur Loco Shed or Gomoh Loco Shed based WAP-7 and WAP-4 electric locomotive from end to end.
