= Lamta railway station =

Railway station in Madhya Pradesh, India

General information
- Location: M.P. SH 11, Nainpur Road Balaghat district, Madhya Pradesh; India
- Coordinates: 22.1360°N 80.1245°E
- Elevation: 355 metres (1,165 ft)
- System: Indian Railways station
- Owner: Indian Railways
- Operator: South East Central Railway
- Line: Satpura Railway (1903–2015)
- Platforms: 2
- Tracks: 2
- Connections: Auto stand

Construction
- Structure type: Standard (on ground station)

Other information
- Status: Under construction – gauge conversion
- Station code: LTA
- Zone(s): South East Central Railway
- Division(s): Nagpur railway division
Location

Lamta railway station is a small railway station in Balaghat district, Madhya Pradesh. Its code is LTA. It serves Lamta village.

Lamta was a railway station of the Satpura narrow gauge (2 ft 6 in (762 mm)) railway, today part of Nagpur railway division of South East Central Railway zone. In October 2015 all narrow gauge network in Nagpur division (622 km), was closed for gauge conversion, except Nagpur–Naghbir line.

The approval of the gauge conversion works have been involved in controversy, since the Union's environment ministry authorized the construction works in Balaghat–Nainpur section (77 km), which passes through Kanha–Pench tiger corridor.

The station is on the Jabalpur–Gondia line (227 km), almost entirely converted to broad gauge. As of January 2020, a small stretch of 25 km remains closed for conversion, from Samnapur to Lamta station (25 km).
