= Gwarighat railway station =

Railway station in Madhya Pradesh, India

General information
- Location: Awadhpuri Colony, Gwarighat, Jabalpur, Madhya Pradesh; India
- Coordinates: 23.1098°N 79.9377°E
- Elevation: 389 metres (1,276 ft)
- System: Indian Railways station
- Owner: Indian Railways
- Operator: South East Central Railway
- Line: Jabalpur–Balaghat–Gondia line
- Platforms: 2
- Tracks: 3
- Connections: Auto stand

Construction
- Structure type: Standard (on-ground station)
- Parking: No
- Cycle facilities: No

Other information
- Status: Single electrified line
- Station code: GRG
- Zone(s): South East Central Railway
- Division(s): Nagpur SEC

Services
Preceding station	Indian Railways	Following station
Garha Goods Shed towards ?	South East Central Railway zone Jabalpur–Balaghat–Gondia line	Jamtara Paraswara towards ?
Location

Gwarighat railway station is a small railway station in Jabalpur district, Madhya Pradesh. Its code is GRG. It serves Jabalpur city. The station consists of two platforms, neither of which is well sheltered. It lacks many facilities including water and sanitation.
