= Gaya–Chennai Egmore Weekly Superfast Express =

Gaya–Chennai Central Weekly SF Express
Overview
- Service type: Superfast Express
- Locale: Tamil Nadu, Andhra Pradesh, Telangana, Maharashtra, Madhya Pradesh, Uttar Pradesh & Bihar
- Current operator: East Central Railways

Route
- Termini: Gaya Junction (GAYA); Chennai Central (MAS)
- Stops: 16
- Distance travelled: 2,348 km (1,459 mi)
- Average journey time: 39 hrs 10 mins
- Service frequency: Weekly (Note: Runs one day in a week for every direction.)
- Train number: 12389 / 12390

On-board services
- Classes: AC 2 tier, AC 3 tier, Sleeper class, General Unreserved
- Seating arrangements: No
- Sleeping arrangements: Yes
- Catering facilities: Available
- Observation facilities: Rake sharing with 12397/12398 Mahabodhi Express
- Baggage facilities: Below the seats

Technical
- Rolling stock: LHB coach
- Track gauge: 1,676 mm (5 ft 6 in)
- Operating speed: 60 km/h (37 mph) average including halts
Route map
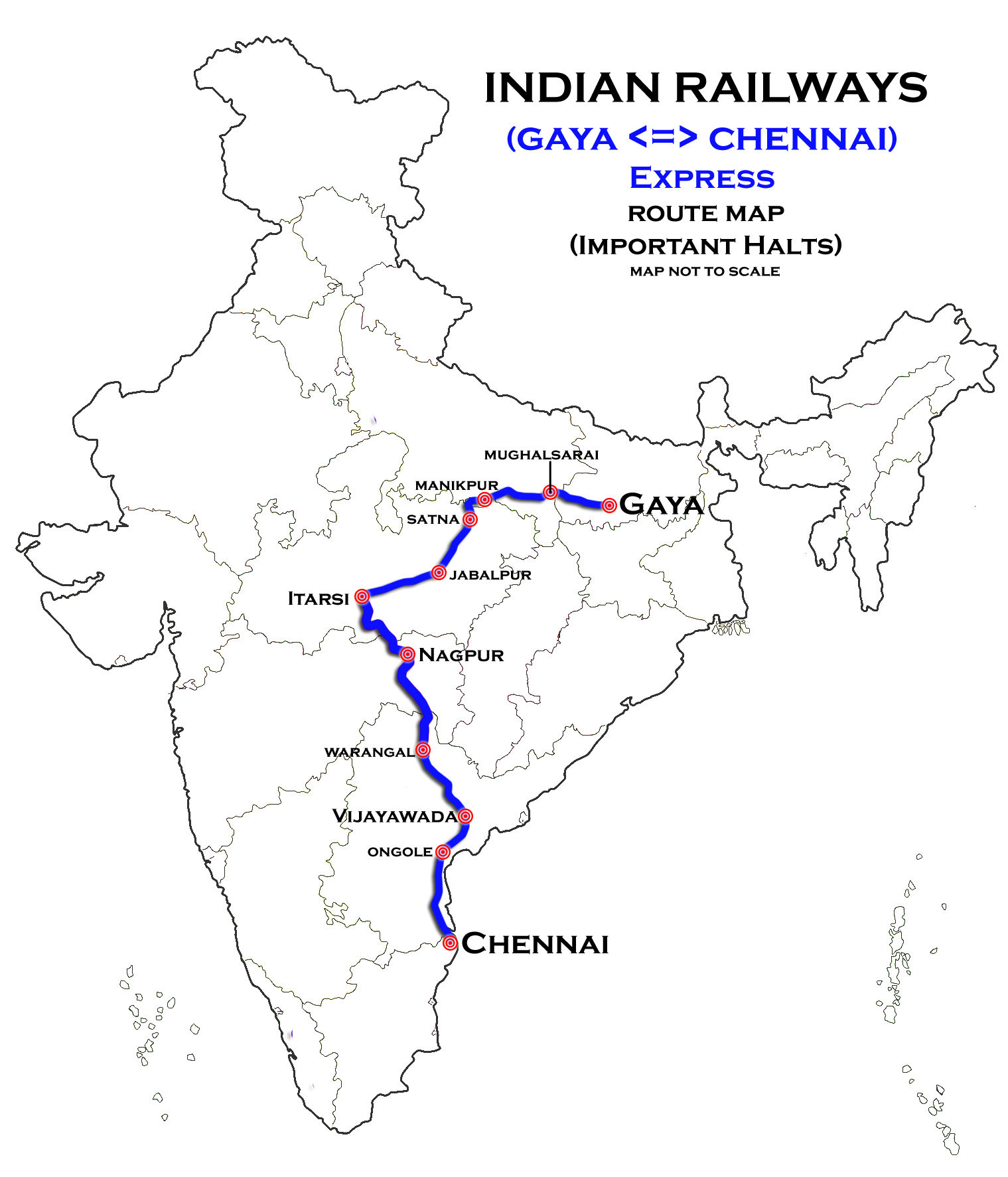

The 12389 / 12390 Gaya–Chennai Central Weekly Superfast Express is a Superfast Express train of the Indian Railways connecting Gaya Junction in Bihar and Chennai Central of Tamil Nadu. It is currently being operated with 12389/12390 train numbers on a weekly basis. From 10 January 2021, the terminal was changed from Chennai Egmore to Chennai Central. Henceforth it arrives and departs from Chennai Central instead of Chennai Egmore

== Service ==
The 12389/Gaya–Chennai Central Weekly Superfast Express has an average speed of 60 km/h and covers 2348 km in 39 hrs. 12390/Chennai Central–Gaya Weekly Superfast Express has an average speed of 62 km/h and covers 2348 km in 38 hrs 40 mins.

== Route & halts ==
The important halts of the train are:

- Gaya Junction
- Dehri-on-Sone
- Sasaram Junction
- Bhabua Road
- Pt. Deen Dayal Upadhyaya Junction
- Prayagraj Chheoki Junction
- Satna Junction
- Katni Junction
- Jabalpur Junction
- Nainpur Junction
- Balaghat Junction
- Gondia Junction
- Arjuni
- Balharshah Junction
- Warangal
- Vijayawada Junction
- Ongole
- Nellore
- Chennai Central

== Coach composition ==
The train has standard LHB rake with max speed of 130 kmph. The train consists of 22 coaches:

- 2 AC II Tier
- 3 AC III Tier
- 10 Sleeper coaches
- 1 Pantry car
- 4 General
- 2 Generator coach

== Traction ==
Both trains are hauled by a Gomoh Loco Shed-based WAP-7 locomotive from Gaya Junction to Chennai Central and vice versa.

== Rake sharing ==
The train shares its rake with 12397/12398 Mahabodhi Express.

== See also ==
- Gaya Junction railway station
- Chennai Central railway station
- Mahabodhi Express
