= Lokmanya Tilak Terminus–Prayagraj Duronto Express =

Train in India

Mumbai LTT - Prayagraj Jn AC Duronto Express
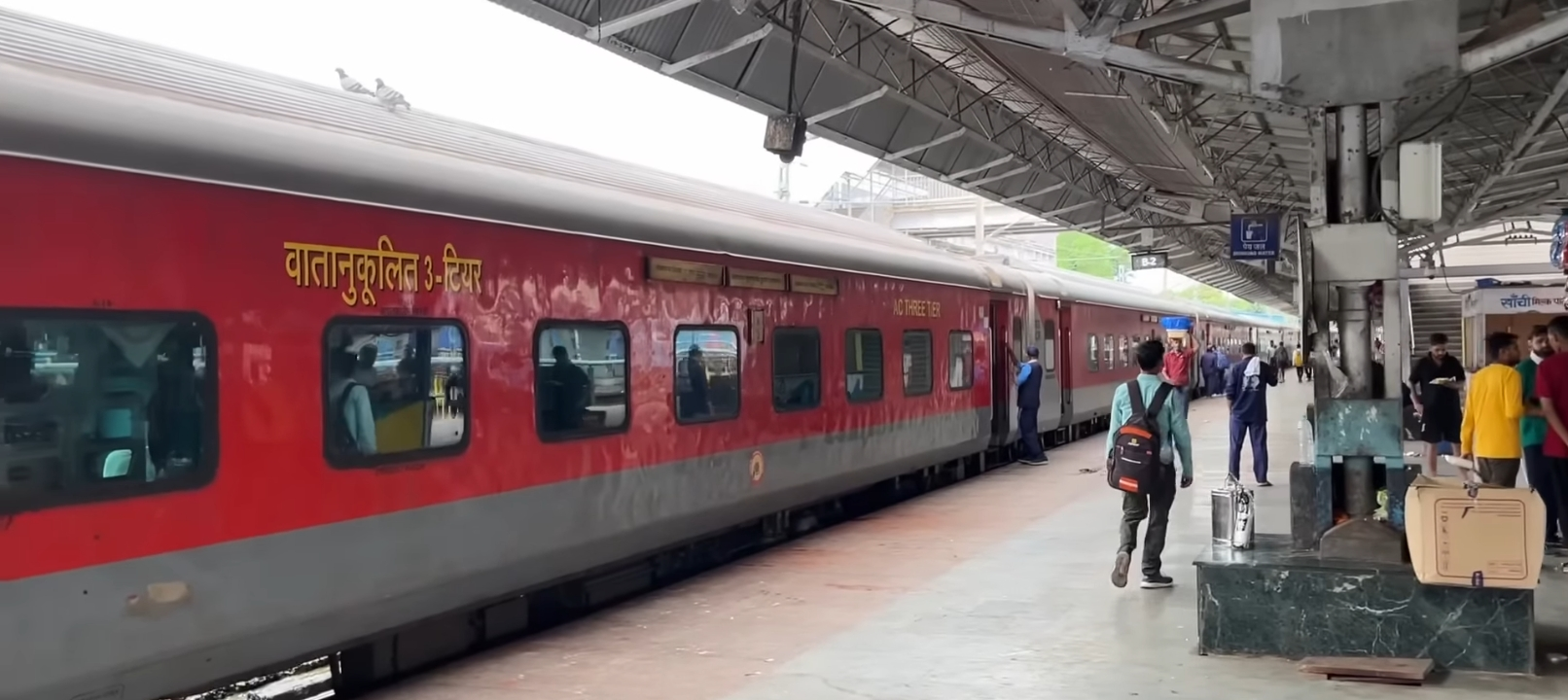
- Mumbai LTT - Prayagraj Duronto Express Arrived At Itarsi Junction

Overview
- Service type: Duronto Express
- First service: 11 March 2012
- Current operator: Central Railway

Route
- Termini: Lokmanya Tilak Terminus; Prayagraj Junction
- Stops: 4
- Distance travelled: 1,348 km (838 mi)
- Average journey time: 19h 10m
- Service frequency: Bi-weekly
- Train number: 12293 / 12294

On-board services
- Classes: AC 1st Class, AC 2 tier, AC 3 tier
- Seating arrangements: No
- Sleeping arrangements: Yes
- Catering facilities: Yes
- Observation facilities: Rake sharing with 22115/22116 Lokmanya Tilak Terminus–Karmali AC Superfast Express
- Baggage facilities: No
- Other facilities: Below the seats

Technical
- Rolling stock: LHB coach
- Track gauge: Broad Gauge – 1,676 mm (5 ft 6 in)
- Operating speed: 70.33 km/h (Average)

The Lokmanya Tilak Terminus–Prayagraj Duronto Express, also known as LTT–Prayagraj Duronto Express, is a Duronto Express train of the Indian Railways connecting Lokmanya Tilak Terminus (LTT) to Prayagraj Junction railway station (PRYG). It is the forty-fourth fastest-running train in India and the fastest train between Mumbai and Prayagraj. It is currently being operated with 12293 / 12294 train numbers.

== Train details ==
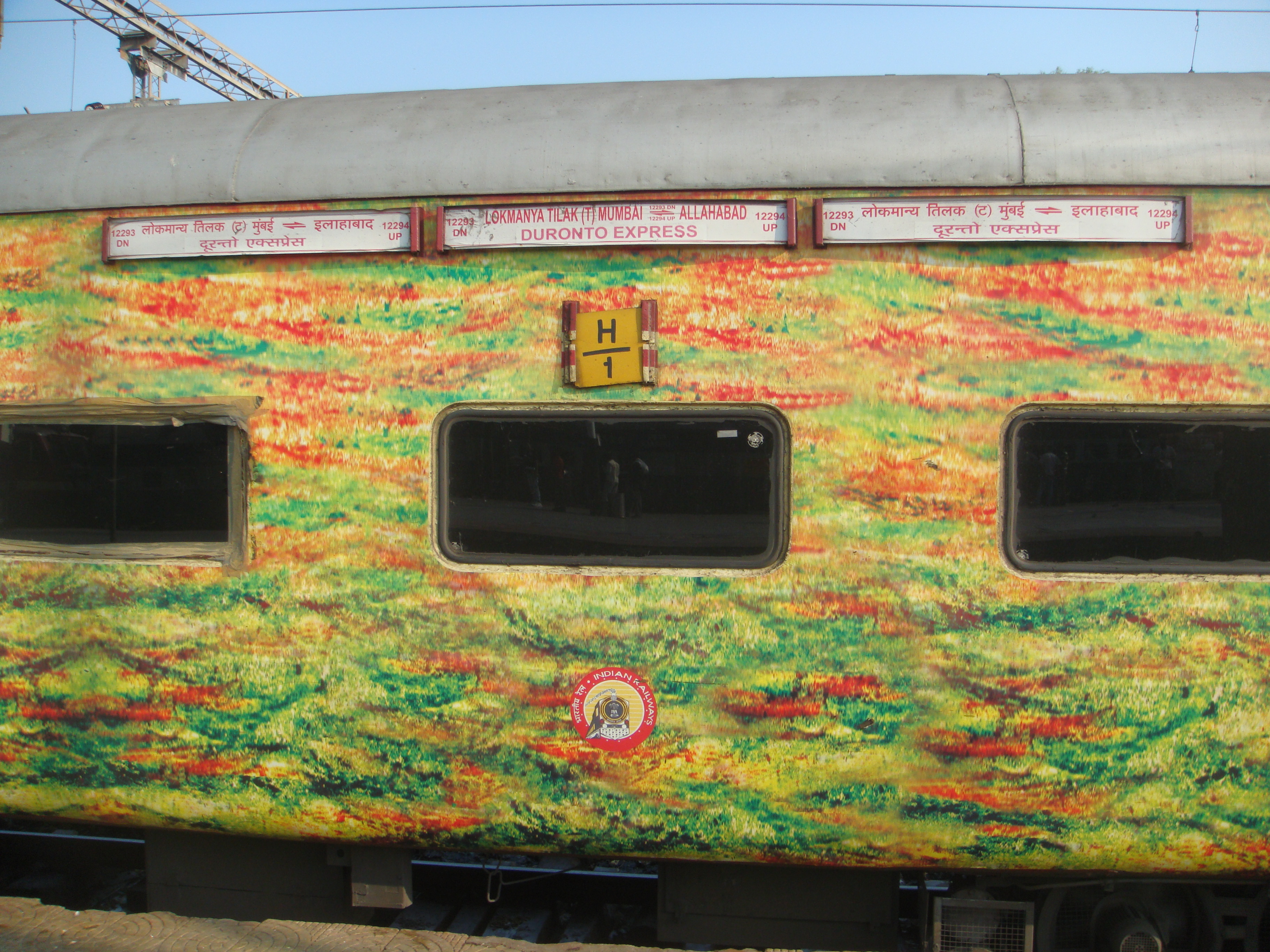
12293 Duronto Express Coach H1 in 3 languages

This train had its inaugural run on 11 March 2012 as train number 01093 from Lokmanya Tilak Terminus to Prayagraj Junction. Regular services commenced on 13 March 2012 as train no. 12294 & on 16 March 2012 as train no. 12293. It is a fully AC train & previously it used refurbished ICF Rajdhani Coaches.

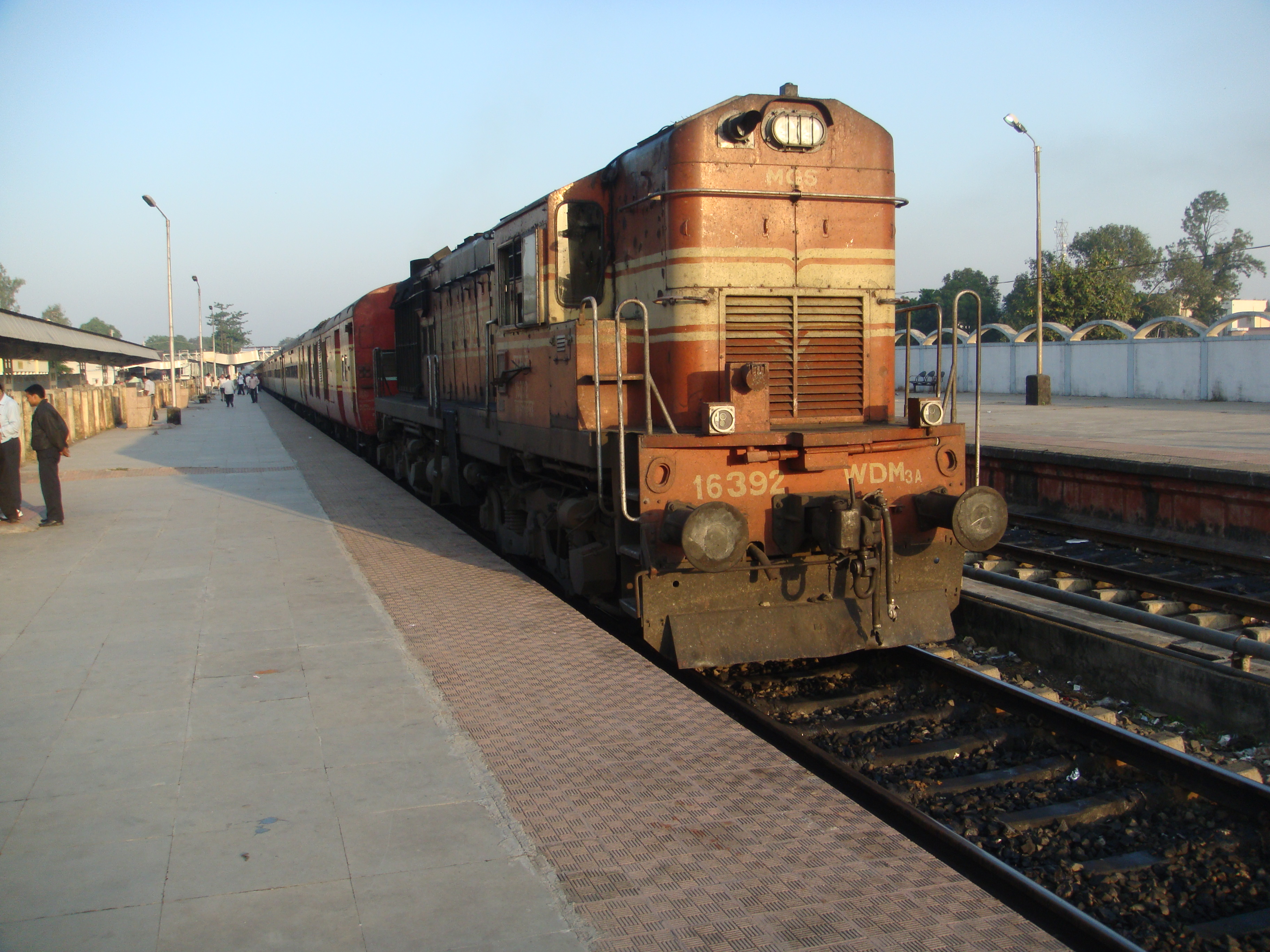
WDM-3A with 12293 Duronto Express at Madan Mahal station

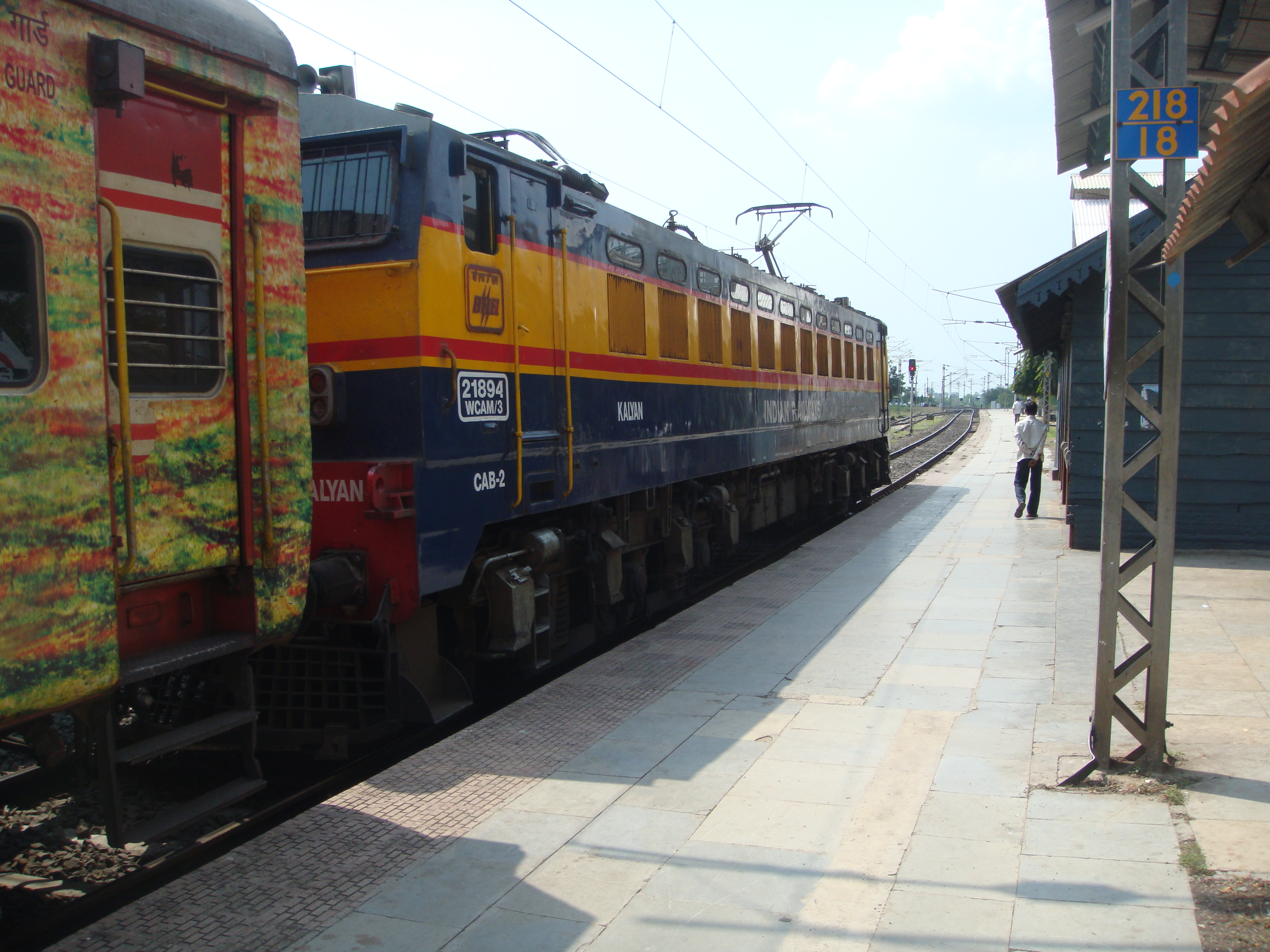
WCAM-3 with 12294 Duronto Express at Niphad

== Technical stoppages ==
Being a Duronto Express train, it had no commercial halts between its terminal stops. However, later many of its technical halts are converted into commercial halts because of low response to Duronto Express trains. This train (12293) has 4 commercial halts & 3 technical halts, at Kasara, Igatpuri, Bhusaval Junction, Itarsi Junction, Jabalpur Junction, Itarsi Junction, Katni Junction and Satna. It takes 7 minutes at Kasara for addition of banker engine for the run through the ghats, Igatpuri of about 5 minutes for the removal of bankers, at Bhusaval of about 5 minutes for crew change, Itarsi for 20 minutes for locomotive change, Satna Junction for 10 mins for breakfast pick up.

12293 Down Mumbai LTT–Prayagraj AC Duronto Express

Station code	Station name	Arrival	Departure
LTT	Lokmanya Tilak Terminus	Starting station	Monday, Friday
PRYJ	Prayagraj Junction	Tuesday, Saturday	Arrival station

12294 UP Prayagraj–Mumbai LTT AC Duronto Express

Station code	Station name	Arrival	Departure
PRYJ	Prayagraj Junction	Starting station	Tuesday, Saturday
LTT	Lokmanya Tilak Terminus	Sunday, Wednesday	Arrival station

== Coaches ==
The Mumbai–Prayagraj Duronto Express has one AC 1st Class coach, three AC 2 tier class coaches, one pantry cars, two luggage-cum-generator coaches & up to eight AC 3 tier coaches taking the total up to 15 coaches.

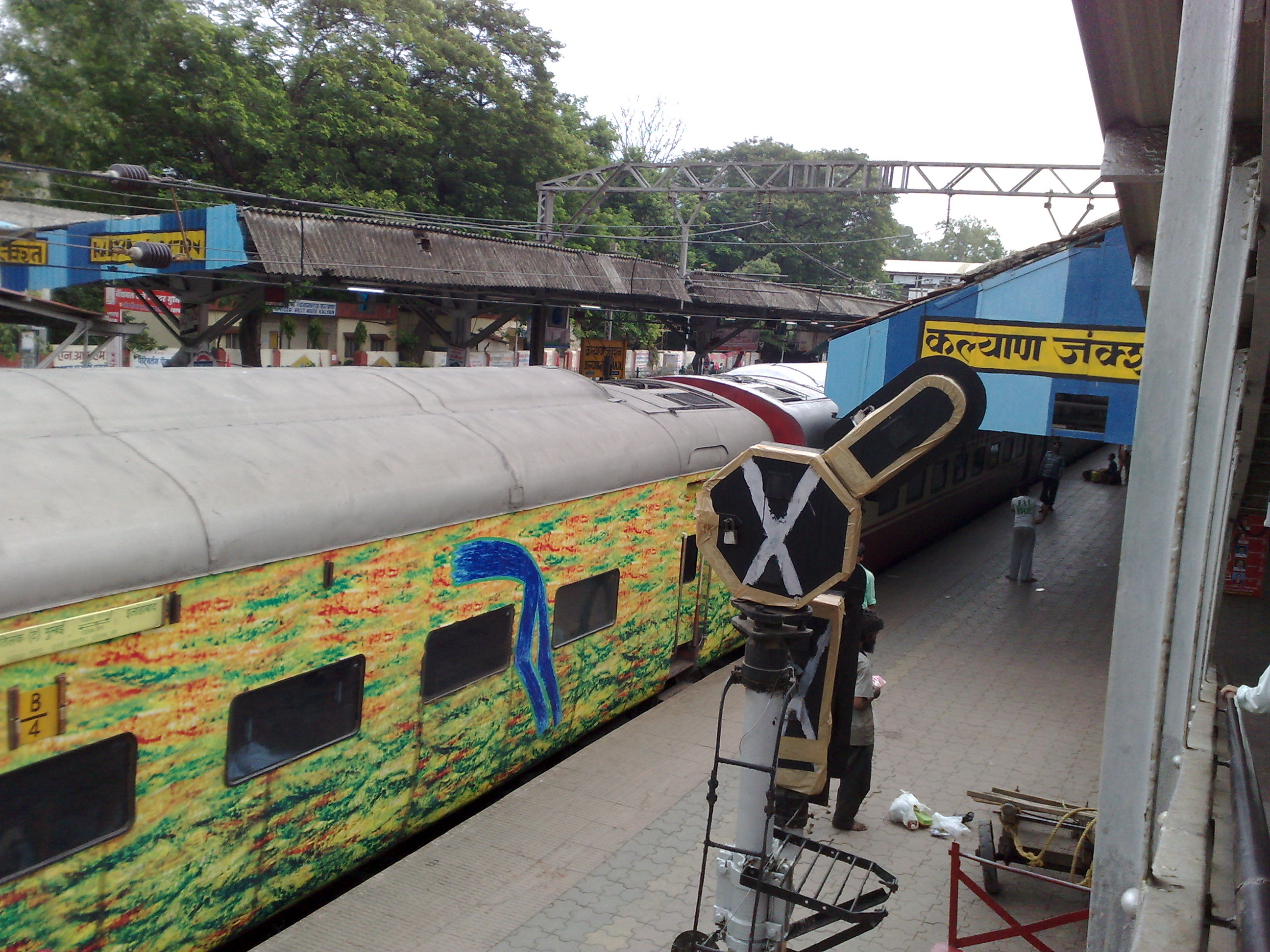
12294 Prayagraj Duronto Express passing Kalyan Junction

Loco	1	2	3	4	5	6	7	8	9	10	11	12	13	14	15
	EOG	B8	B7	B6	B5	B4	B3	B2	B1	PC	H1	A3	A2	A1	EOG

12294 is the reverse composition of the above 12293. B- Three Tier AC Sleeper (Third AC), A- Two Tier AC Sleeper (Second AC), H- AC First class cabins (First AC), PC-Pantry (Hot buffet) car, EOG/GV-Generator van cum Guard van

== Traction ==
Now the route is fully electrified, a WAP-7 from the Electric Loco Shed, Ajni hauls the train from Lokmanya Tilak Terminus to Prayagraj Junction.
