= Ghoti railway station =

Railway Station in Maharashtra, India

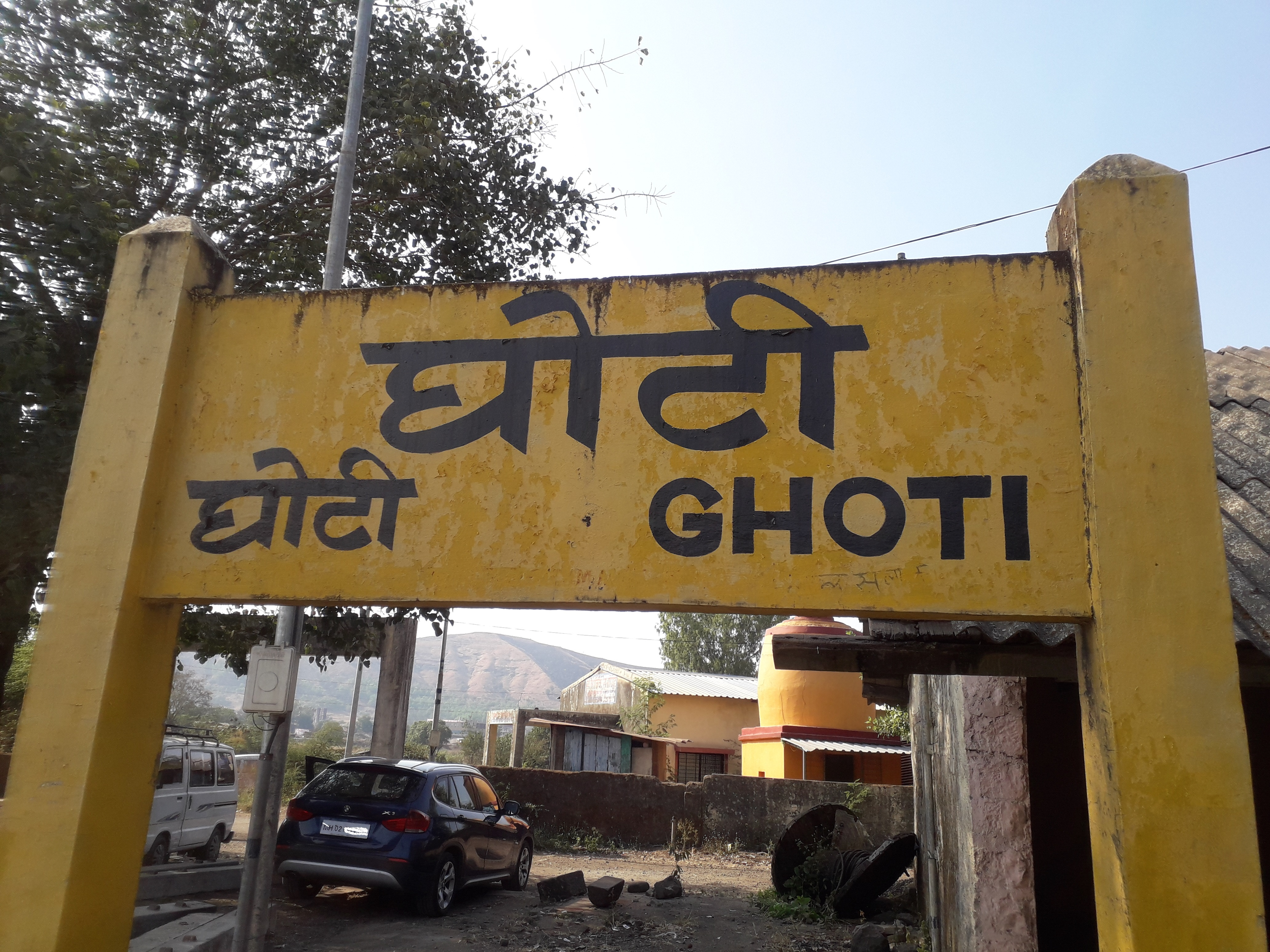

General information
- Location: Ghoti Budruk, Igatpuri, Nashik district PIN-422202; India
- Coordinates: 19°41′41″N 73°33′44″E
- Elevation: 577.000 metres (1,893.045 ft)
- System: Express train and Passenger train station
- Owner: Indian Railways
- Operator: Central Railway zone
- Lines: Bhusawal–Kalyan section of Howrah–Nagpur–Mumbai line, Howrah–Allahabad–Mumbai line
- Platforms: 2

Construction
- Structure type: Standard, on ground

Other information
- Station code: GO
- Zone(s): Central Railway zone
- Division(s): Bhusawal

History
- Opened: 1865; 161 years ago
- Electrified: 1929; 97 years ago
- Former names: Great Indian Peninsula Railway

Services
Preceding station	Indian Railways	Following station
Padli towards ?	Central Railway zone Howrah–Nagpur–Mumbai line, Howrah–Allahabad–Mumbai line, New Delhi–Bhopal–Mumbai line	Igatpuri towards ?
Location
- Location within India Location within Maharashtra

Ghoti railway station is located in Maharashtra, Nashik, Igatpuri. It belongs to Central Railway, Bhusaval Jn. Its station code is GO. It has two platforms.

Neighbouring stations are Igatpuri railway station and Padli railway station. The nearest major railway station is Nasik Road.

Igatpur-Bhusaval memu with number 11119 and 11120 run on this station. The nearest airport is Gandhinagar (33 km). Tourist place Purushwadi is close to Igatpuri and Ghoti.

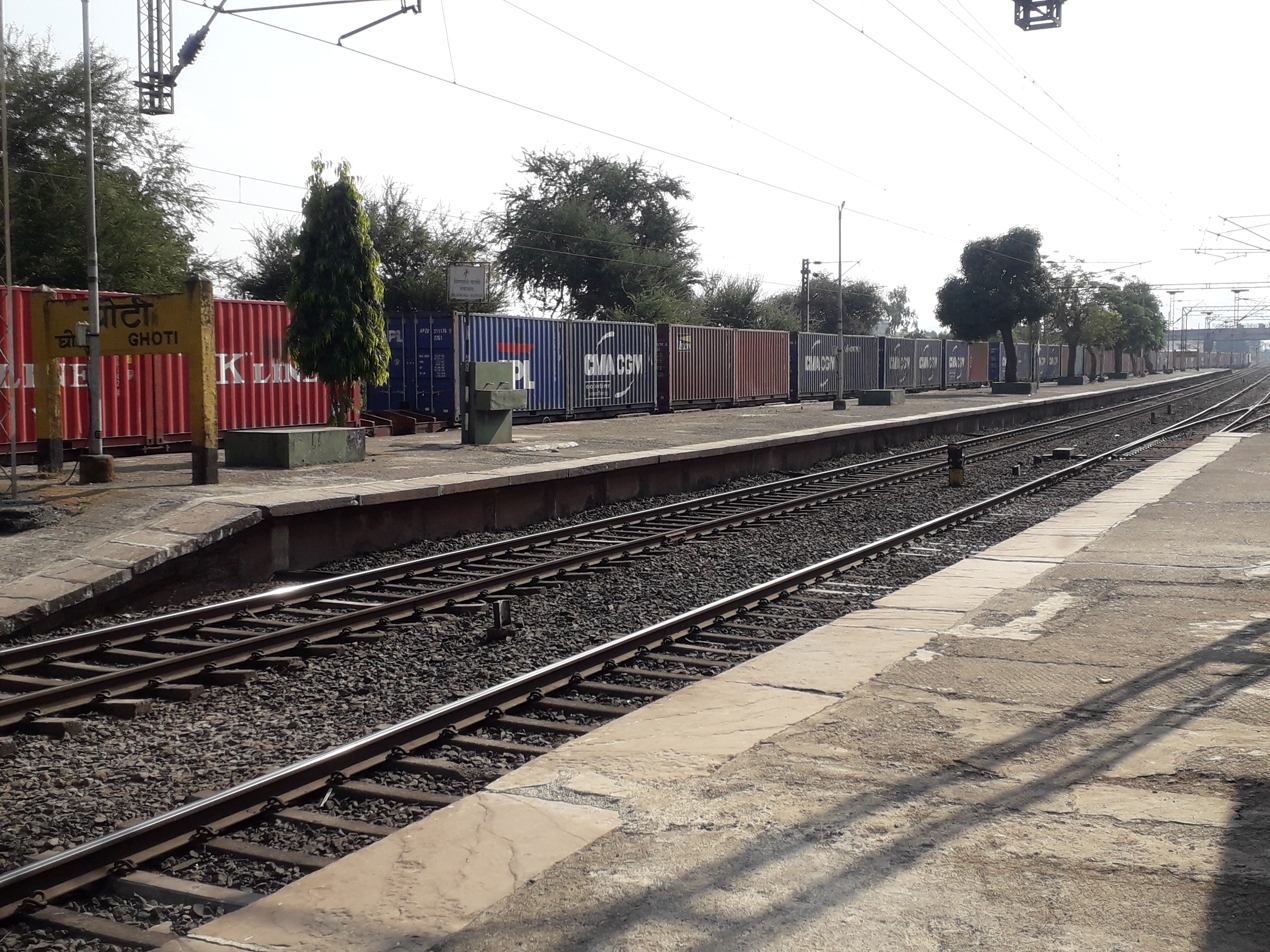
Ghoti railway station -Overview

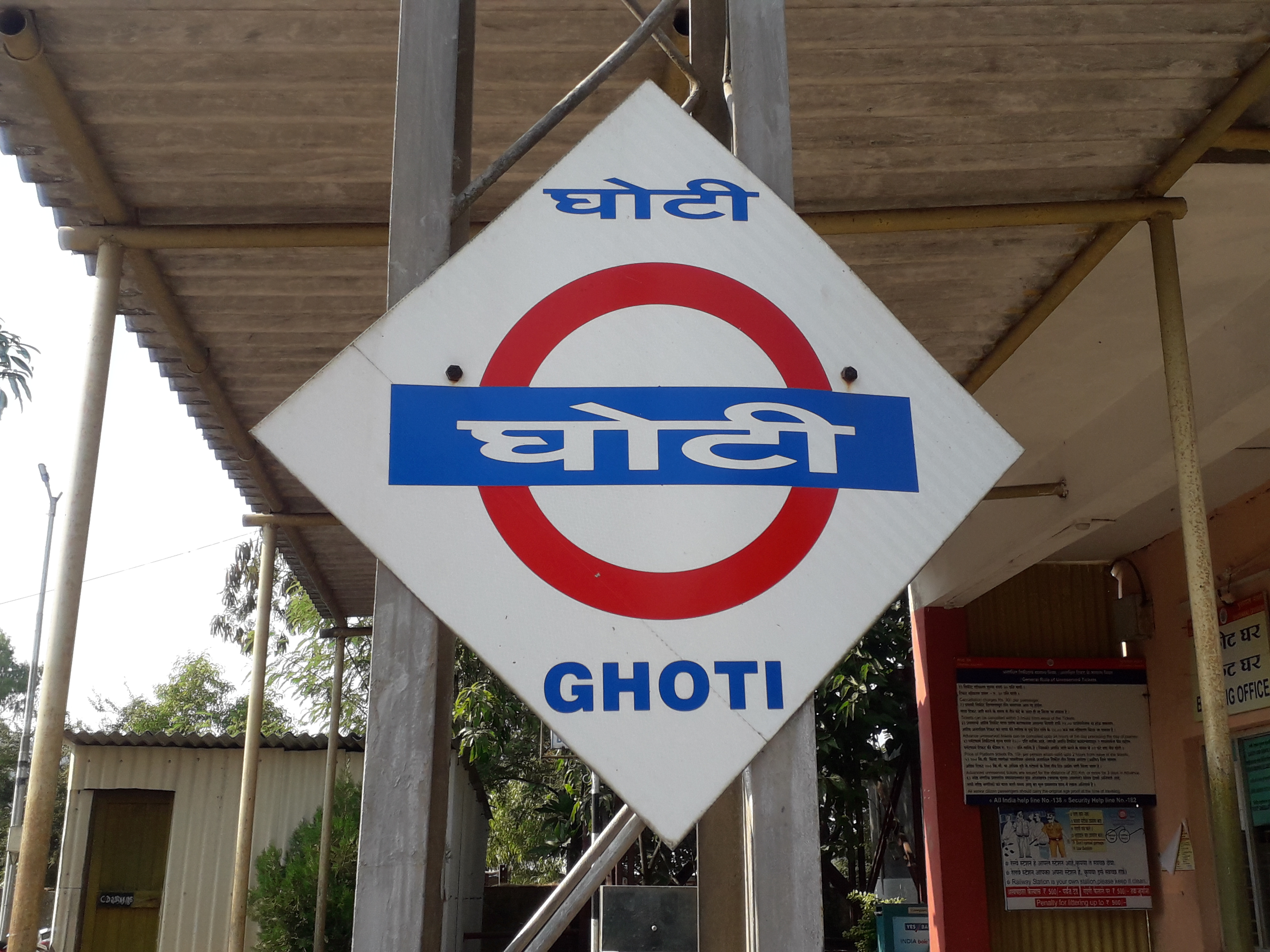
Ghoti railway station – Platform board
