= Gitanjali Express =

Train in India

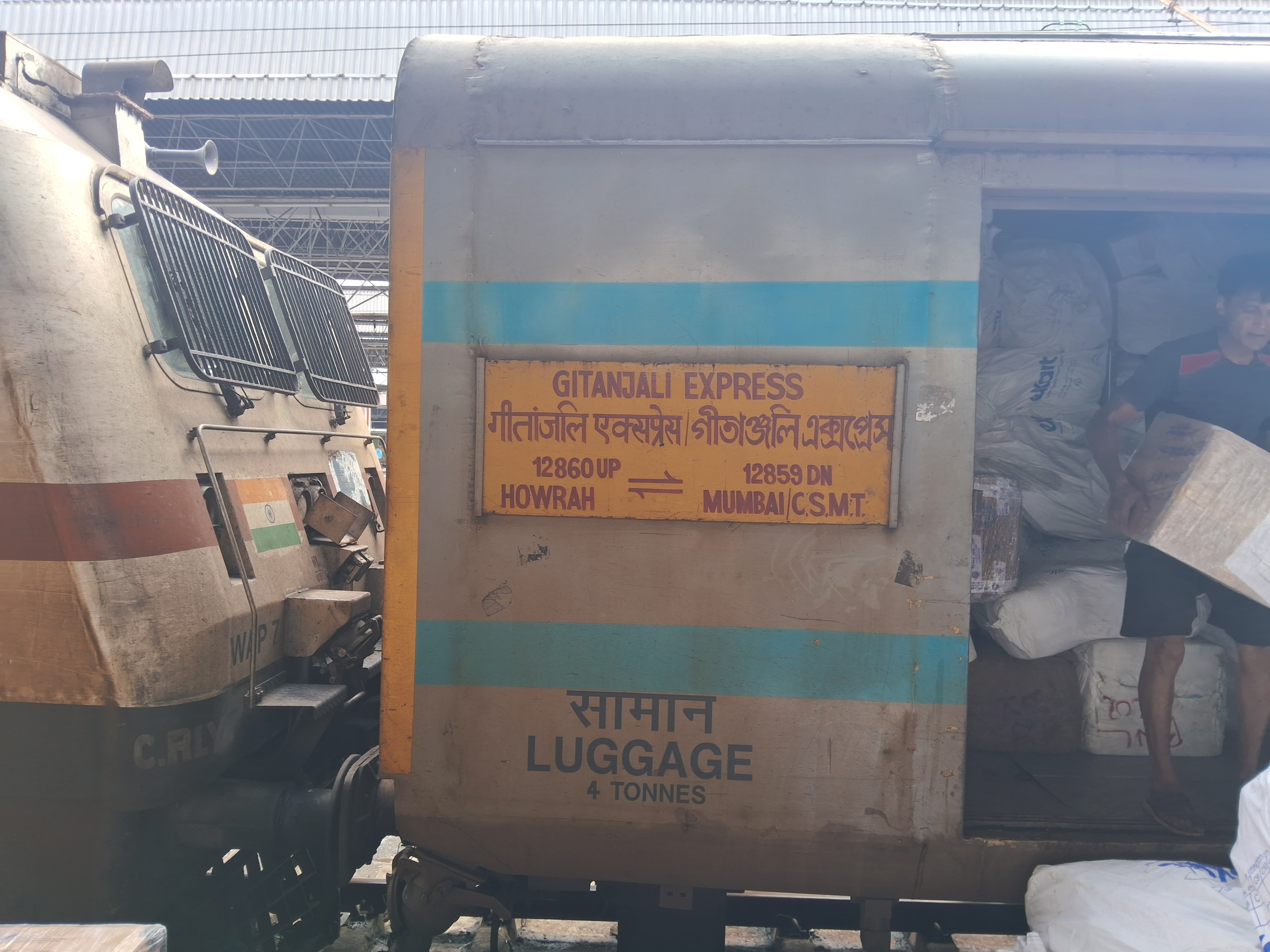
- Gitanjali Express train board.

Overview
- Service type: Superfast
- Locale: West Bengal, Jharkhand, Odisha, Chhattisgarh & Maharashtra
- First service: 4 November 1977; 48 years ago
- Current operator: South Eastern Railway

Route
- Termini: Mumbai CSMT (CSMT); Howrah Junction (HWH)
- Stops: 25
- Distance travelled: 1,963 km (1,220 mi)
- Average journey time: 31 hrs 05 mins
- Service frequency: Daily
- Train number: 12859 / 12860

On-board services
- Classes: AC 2 Tier, AC 3 Tier, AC 3 Tier Economy, Sleeper class, General Unreserved
- Seating arrangements: Yes
- Sleeping arrangements: Yes
- Catering facilities: Available
- Observation facilities: Large windows
- Baggage facilities: Available
- Other facilities: Below the seats

Technical
- Rolling stock: LHB coach
- Track gauge: 1,676 mm (5 ft 6 in)
- Operating speed: 130 km/h (81 mph) maximum, 65 km/h (40 mph) average including halts.
Route map
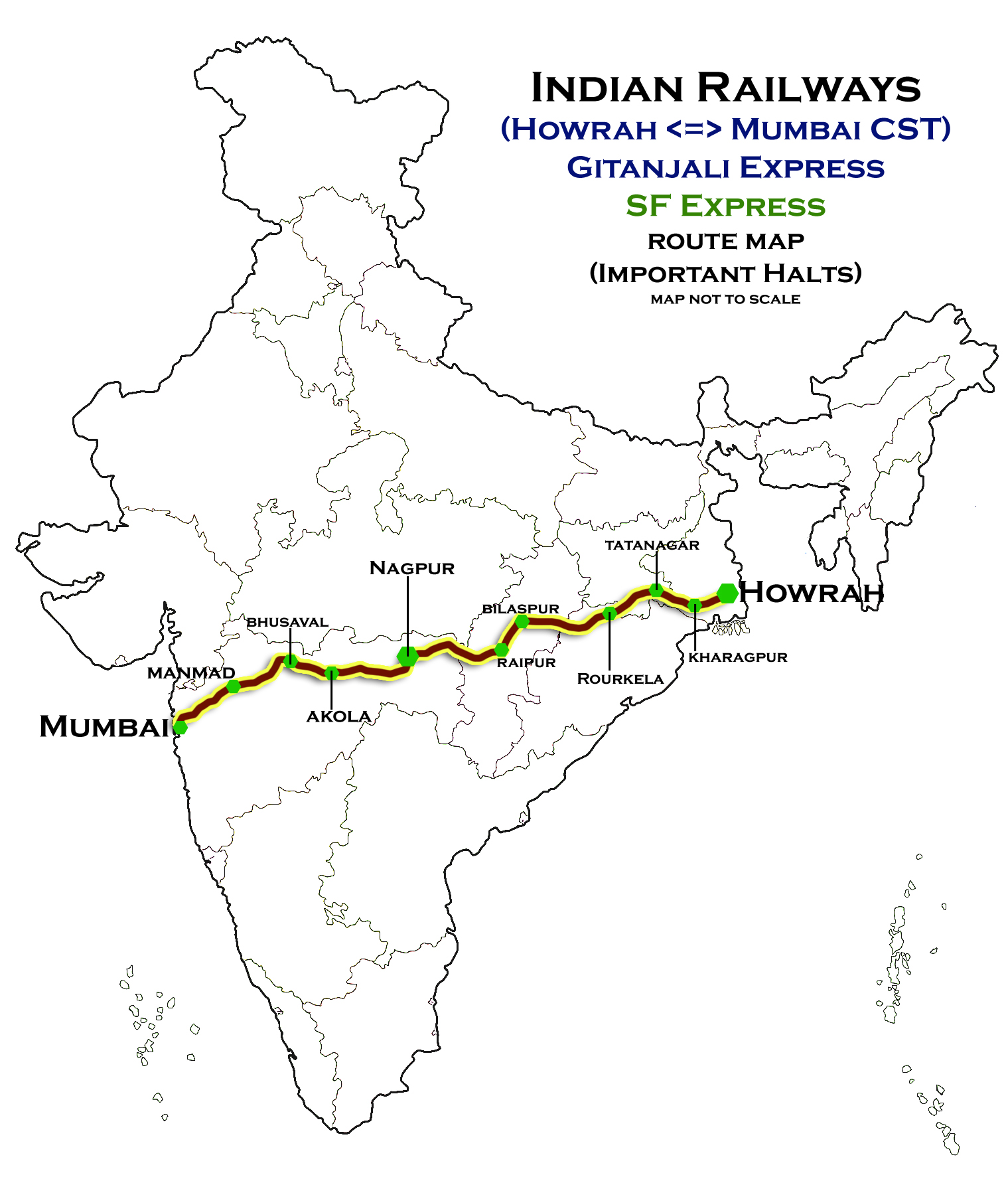
- Gitanjali Express Route map

The 12859 / 12860 Gitanjali Express is a Daily Superfast Express train of Indian Railways running between Two Major Metro Cities Kolkata, (Howrah Junction) in West Bengal and Mumbai, (Chhatrapati Shivaji Maharaj Terminus) in Maharashtra connecting the East with the West. Numbered 12859/60 this train belongs to the Superfast Express category. This train takes 30½ hrs to cover the distance of 1968 km between Mumbai and Howrah while the return takes 31 hrs 15 mins. This is first train which depart behind pure AC Loco from Mumbai CSMT after conversion of Mumbai CSMT to Thane from DC to AC. It has the top most priority in Howrah Mumbai route. It uses the Howrah–Nagpur–Mumbai line.

== Relevance ==
Rabindranath Tagore, a famous poet of India, wrote the book Gitanjali. Since this train, too, starts from Bengal this train has the same name. This is the first Classless train in India, introduced by Ex Railway Minister Prof. Madhu Dandvate on 26 December 1977.

== Train schedule ==
From Chhatrapati Shivaji Maharaj Terminus to Howrah — 12859. The train starts from Chhatrapati Shivaji Maharaj Terminus everyday.

Station code	Station name	Arrival	Departure
CSMT	Chhatrapati Shivaji Maharaj Terminus	---	06:00
DR	Dadar Central	06:12	06:15
KYN	Kalyan Junction	06:52	06:55
KSRA	Kasara railway station	08:00	08:03
IGP	Igatpuri railway station	08:30	08:32
NK	Nashik Road	09:25	09:30
JL	Jalgaon	11:58	12:00
BSL	Bhusaval Junction	12:40	12:45
MKU	Malkapur	13:29	13:30
SEG	Shegaon	14:14	14:15
AK	Akola	14:45	14:50
BD	Badnera	16:12	16:15
WR	Wardha Junction	17:18	17:20
NGP	Nagpur Junction	18:55	19:00
BRD	Bhandara Road	19:51	19:53
G	Gondia	20:48	20:50
RJN	Raj Nandgaon	22:07	22:09
DURG	Durg Junction	22:50	22:55
R	Raipur Junction	23:30	23:35
BSP	Bilaspur Junction	01:20	01:35
RIG	Raigarh	03:11	03:13
JSG	Jharsuguda	04:28	04:30
ROU	Rourkela Junction	05:44	05:52
CKP	Chakradhapur	07:13	07:15
TATA	Tatanagar Junction	08:15	08:25
KGP	Kharagpur	10:23	10:28
SRC	Santragachi Junction	11:47	11:48
HWH	Howrah	12:30	---

Note : Train stops at Kasara & Igatpuri Railway Station only for Bankers Loco attachment & removal at the back of the Train. There is no Commercial halt at these Stations.

From Howrah to Chhatrapati Shivaji Maharaj Terminus — 12860. The train starts from Howrah everyday.

Station code	Station name	Arrival	Departure
HWH	Howrah	---	14:05
KGP	Kharagpur	15:40	15:45
TATA	Tatanagar Junction	17:41	17:48
CKP	Chakradharpur	18:45	18:47
ROU	Rourkela Junction	20:12	20:20
JSG	Jharsuguda	21:53	21:55
RIG	Raigarh	22:58	23:00
BSP	Bilaspur Junction	01:00	01:15
R	Raipur Junction	02:45	02:50
DURG	Durg Junction	03:45	03:50
RJN	Raj Nandgaon	04:12	04:14
G	Gondia	05:40	05:42
BRD	Bhandara Road	06:29	06:31
NGP	Nagpur Junction	07:40	07:45
WR	Wardha Junction	08:48	08:50
BD	Badnera	10:32	10:35
AK	Akola	11:30	11:35
SEG	Shegaon	12:03	12:05
MKU	Malkapur	12:43	12:45
BSL	Bhusaval Junction	13:45	13:50
JL	Jalgaon	14:18	14:20
NK	Nashik Road	17:05	17:10
IGP	Igatpuri	17:57	18:00
KYN	Kalyan Junction	20:02	20:05
DR	Dadar Central	20:47	20:50
CSMT	Chhatrapati Shivaji Maharaj Terminus	21:20	---

== Arrival and departure ==
Train No.12859 leaves source point, Chhatrapati Shivaji Maharaj Terminus Mumbai Daily Early Morning at 6:00 am and reaches its destination station Howrah Junction daily at 12:30 PM in afternoon the next day. Train No.12860 leaves Howrah Junction at 2:05 pm daily and reach its destination, Chhatrapati Shivaji Maharaj Terminus at 9:20 pm next evening it is a daily Superfast Express service with Top Most High Level Priority.

== Traction ==
It is hauled by a Santragachi Loco Shed / Ajni Loco Shed / Kalyan Loco Shed based WAP-7 electric locomotive on its entire journey.

== Coach composition ==
Loco	1	2	3	4	5	6	7	8	9	10	11	12	13	14	15	16	17	18	19	20	21	22
	SLR	GEN	S1	S2	S3	S4	S5	S6	S7	PC	M1	M2	M3	B1	B2	B3	B4	B5	A1	A2	GEN	EOG

== See also ==
- Dedicated Intercity trains of India
