= Igatpuri railway station =

Rail station in Maharashtra, India

Igatpuri इगतपुरी
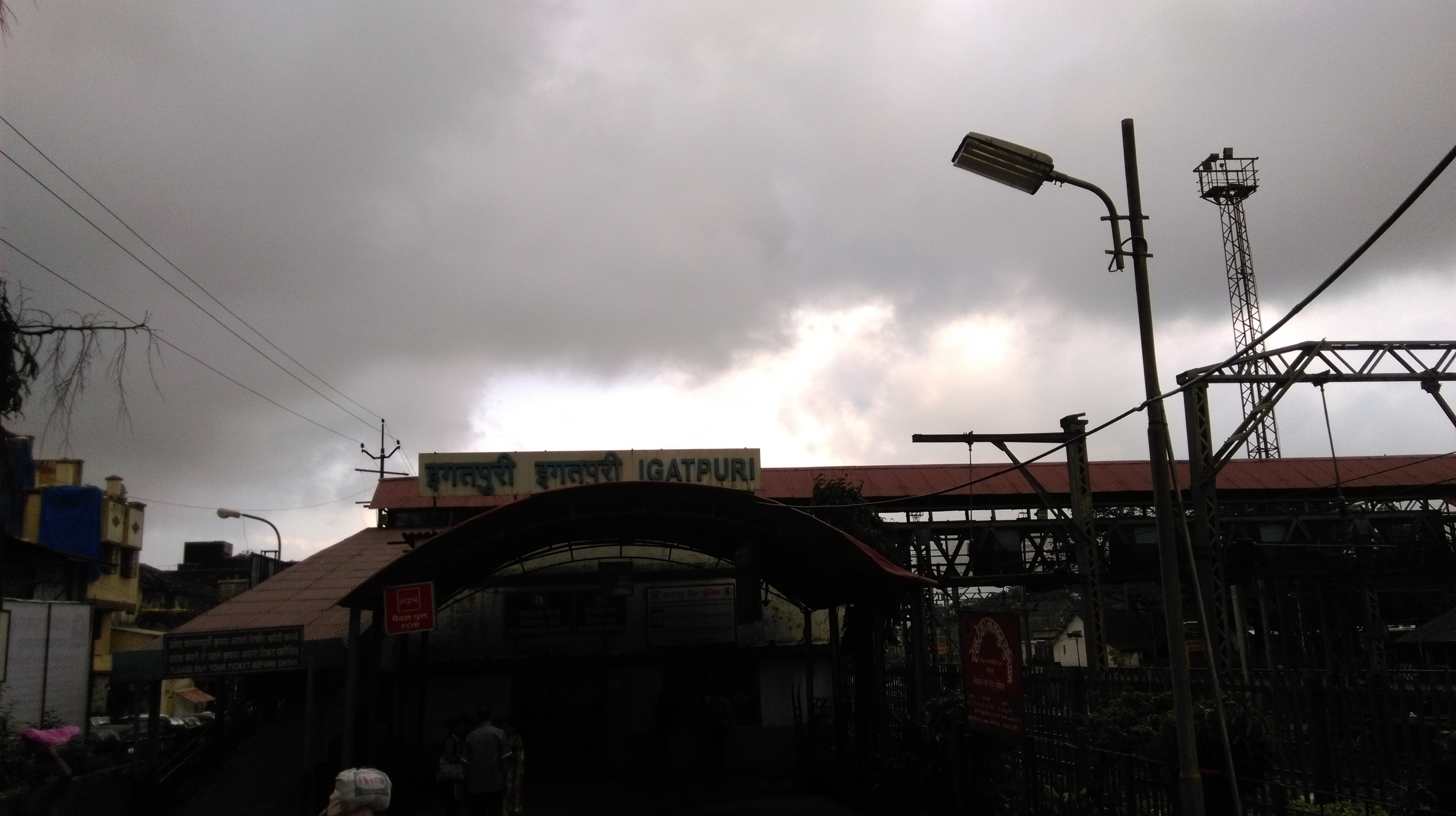

General information
- Location: Igatpuri, Dist.Nashik PIN-422403; India
- Coordinates: 19°41′41″N 73°33′44″E
- Elevation: 599.400 metres (1,966.54 ft)
- System: Station
- Owner: Indian Railways
- Operator: Central Railway
- Lines: Bhusawal–Kalyan section of Howrah–Nagpur–Mumbai line, Howrah–Allahabad–Mumbai line
- Platforms: 4

Construction
- Structure type: Standard, on ground
- Parking: Available

Other information
- Station code: IGP
- Division(s): Mumbai

History
- Opened: 1865
- Electrified: 1929
- Former names: Great Indian Peninsula Railway

Services
Preceding station	Indian Railways	Following station
Ghoti towards ?	Central Railway zone Howrah–Nagpur–Mumbai line, Howrah–Allahabad–Mumbai line, New Delhi–Bhopal–Mumbai line	Kasara towards ?
Location
- Location within Maharashtra Location within India

Igatpuri railway station serves Igatpuri in Nashik district in the Indian state of Maharashtra. It stands at the head of Thal Ghat.

This station used to serve as a loco change-over point for trains moving out of Mumbai as well as trains entering Mumbai. The trains moving out of Mumbai would change their locomotives to WAP-4 or WAP-7 or WAM-4 as the case may be. The trains entering Mumbai would usually change their locomotives to WCAM-3. It is an important technical halt for all trains that go in or out of the Mumbai Metropolitan Region. Here, trains exiting Mumbai detach their banker locomotives over here, whereas trains that enter Mumbai check their emergency brakes over here. The station is famous for its Wada Pav, Idli and coffee.

== History ==
The first train in India travelled from Mumbai to Thane on 16 April 1853. By May 1854, Great Indian Peninsula Railway's Mumbai–Thane line was extended to Kalyan Junction. Bhusaval Junction was set up in 1860, but the service started in the mid-1860s. Service up to Igatpuri was started in 1865.

=== Electrification ===
The Kalyan–Igatpuri section was electrified with 1.5 kV DC overhead system in 1929. Subsequent electrification with 25 kV AC overhead system in the Igatpuri–Manmad sector, with AC/DC change over at Igatpuri, was carried out in 1967–69. The change over of the Mumbai area from DC to AC is complete and AC/DC locomotives are converted to pure AC locomotives.

== Busy station ==
130 trains (excluding Summer Special Trains) pass through Igatpuri (which also includes weeklies and biweeklies, etc.)

== Electric trip sheds ==
Igatpuri has electric trip sheds, with separate sheds for AC locos.

== Gallery ==
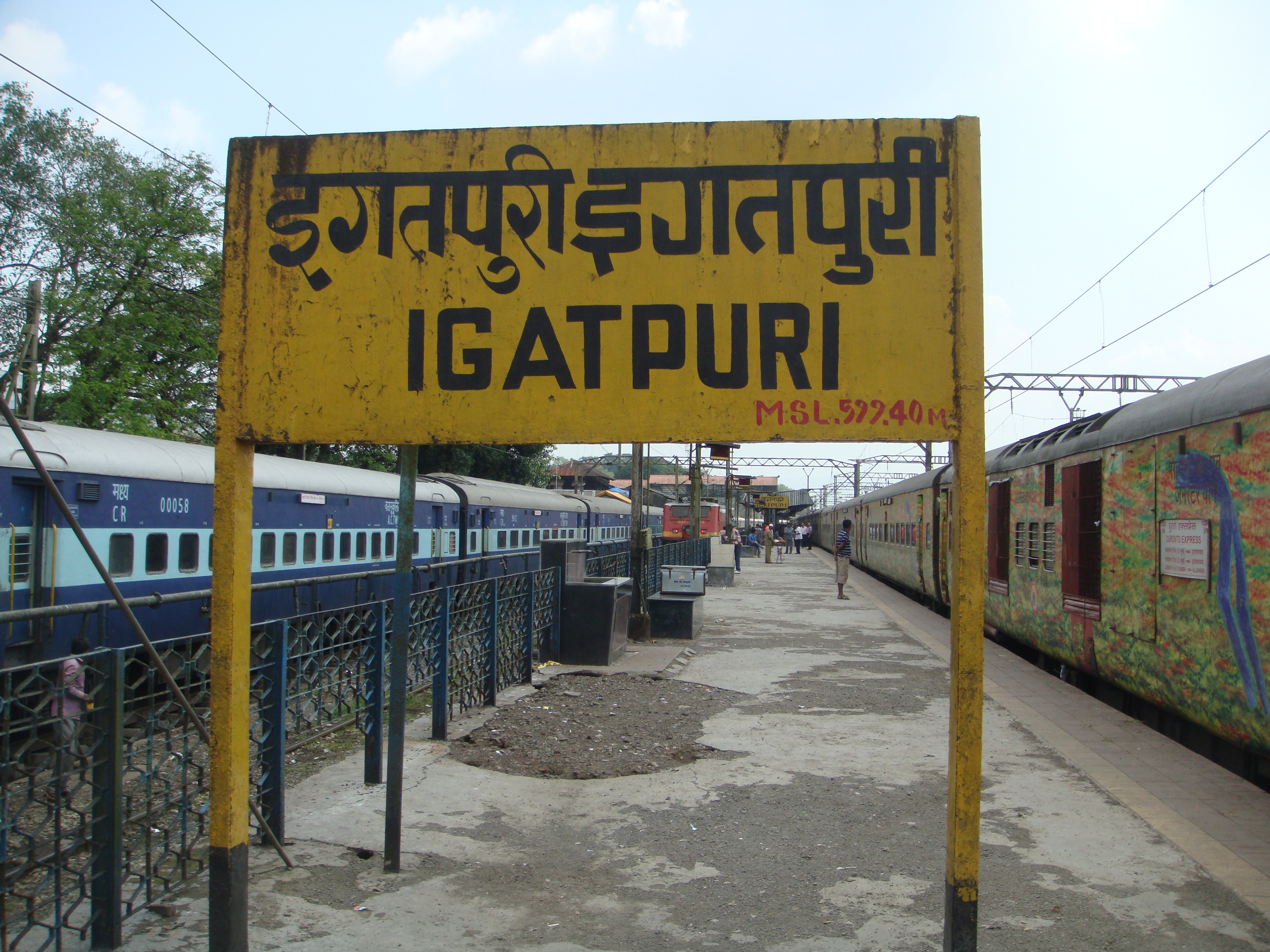
Lokmanya Tilak Terminus–Allahabad Duronto Express at Igatpuri railway station

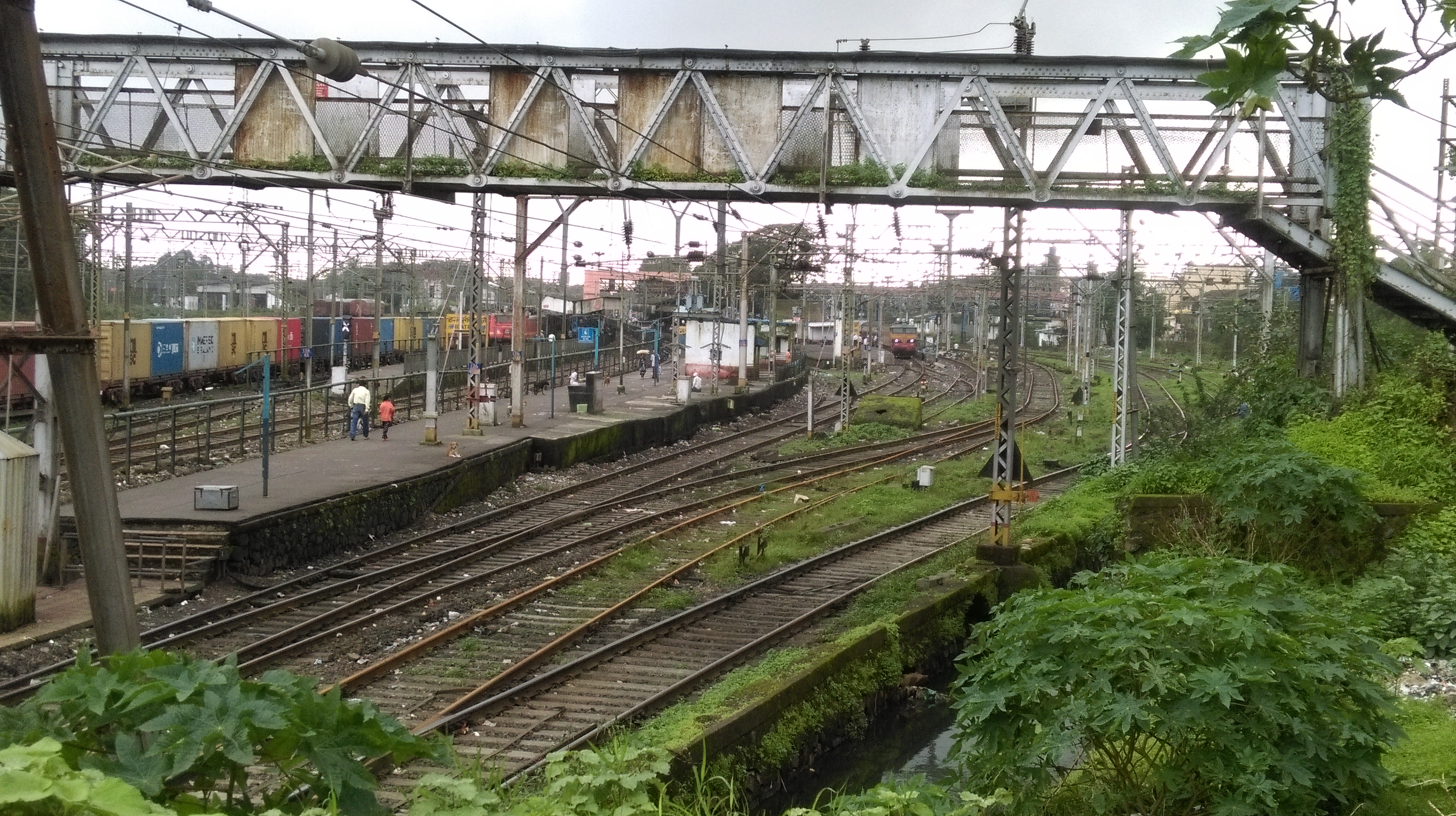
Igatpuri railway station – Overview

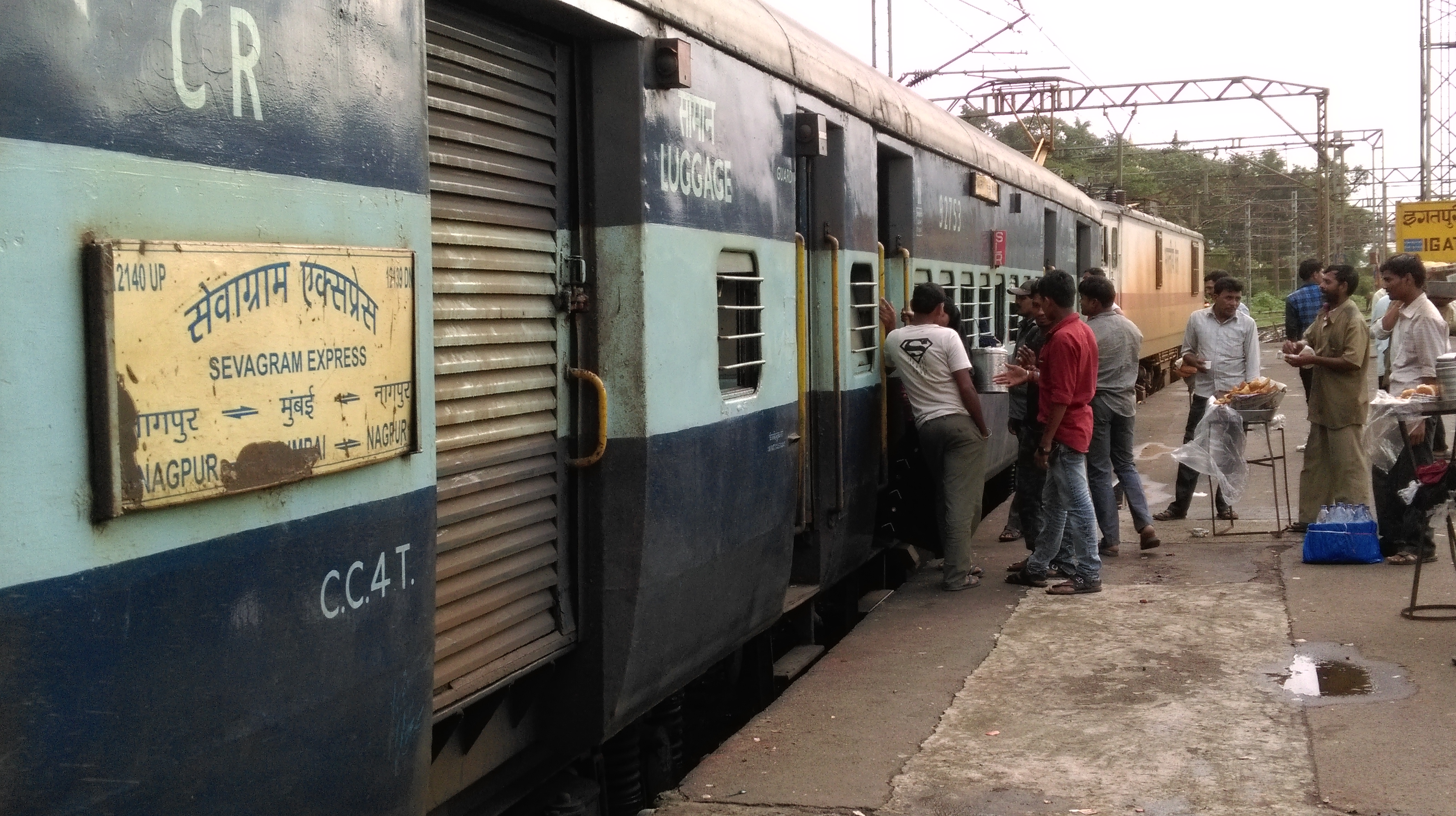
Sewagram Express halted at Igatpuri railway station

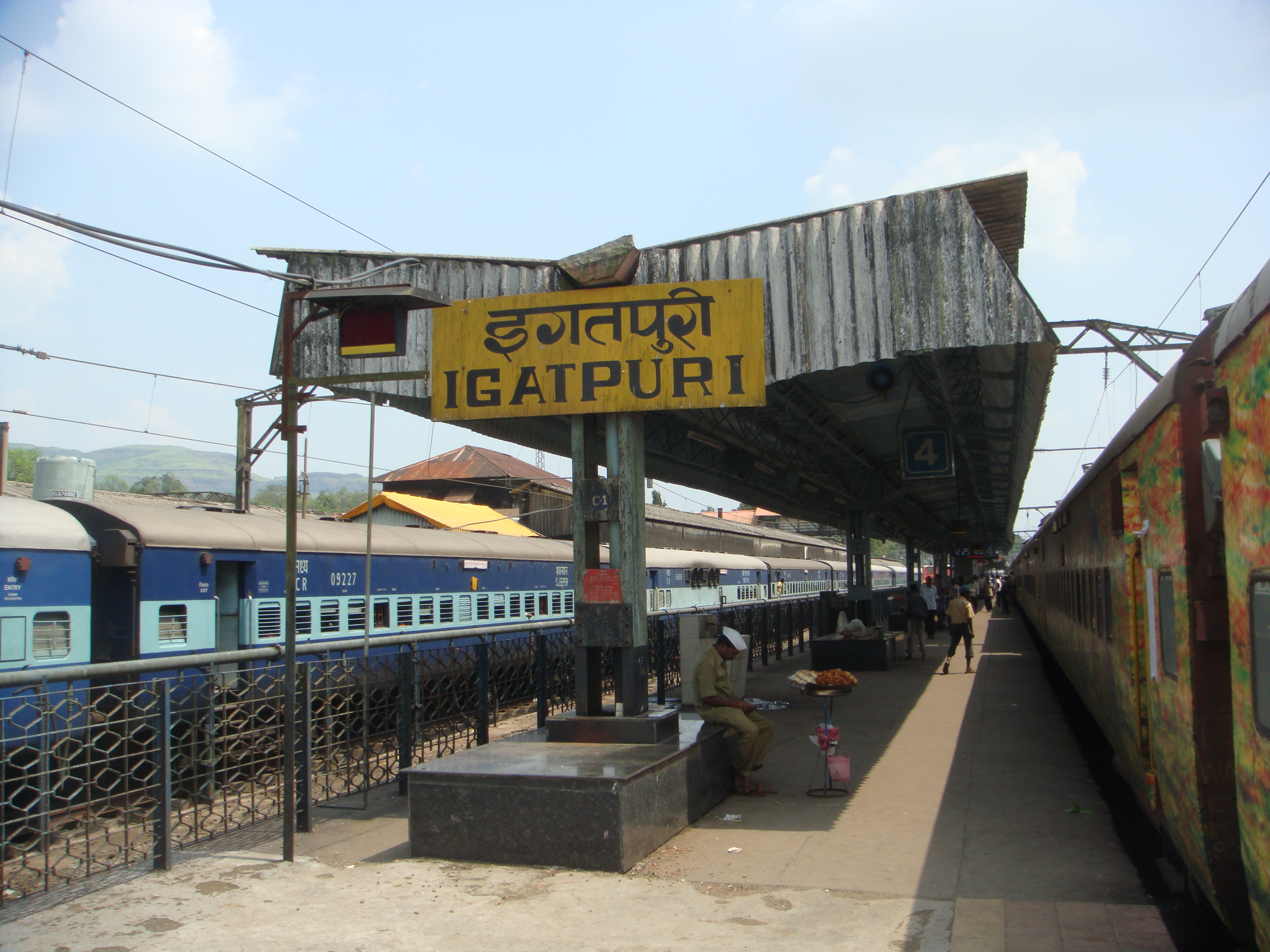
Igatpuri station roof

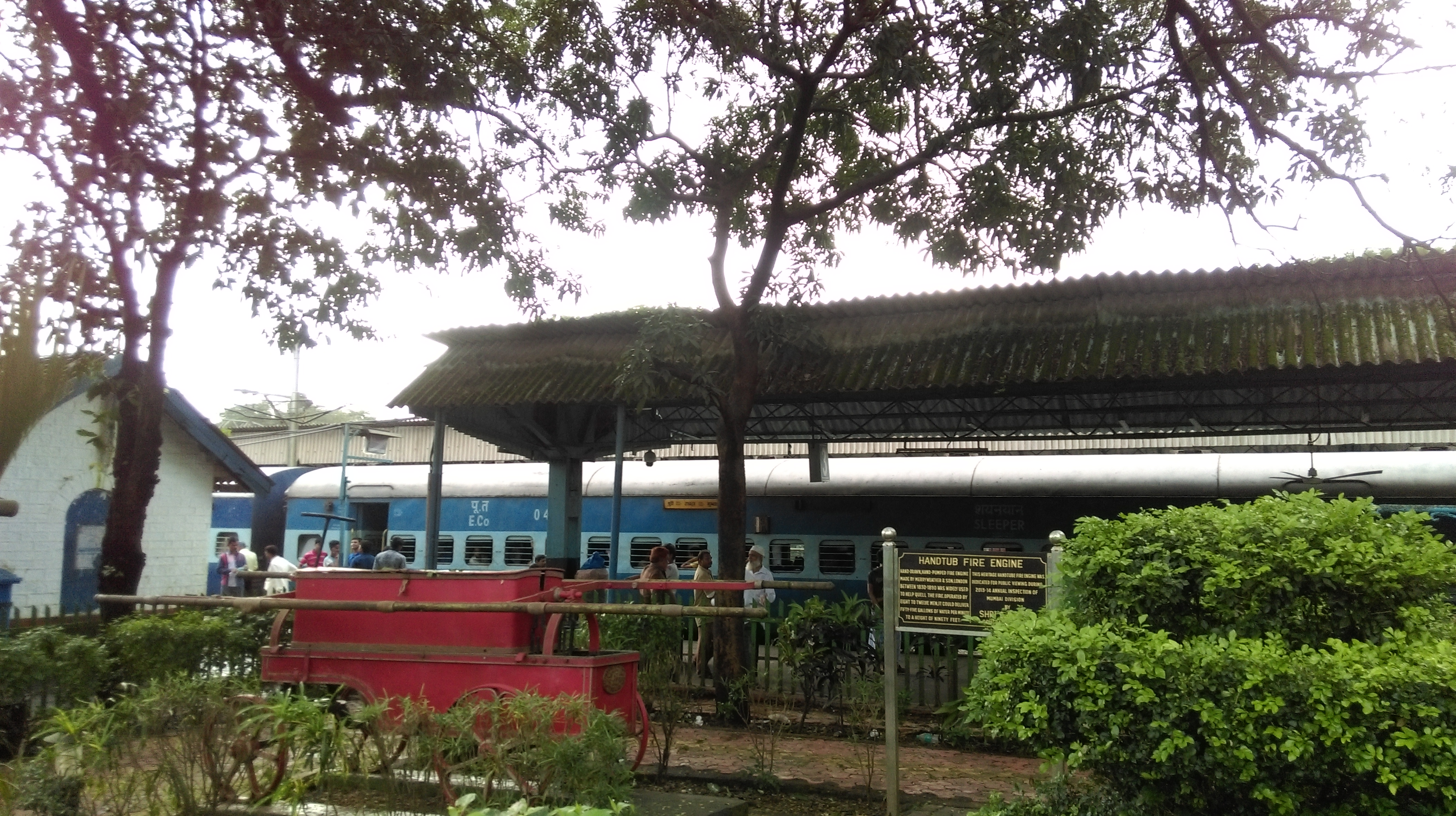
Igatpuri railway station – Ancient Fire Engine

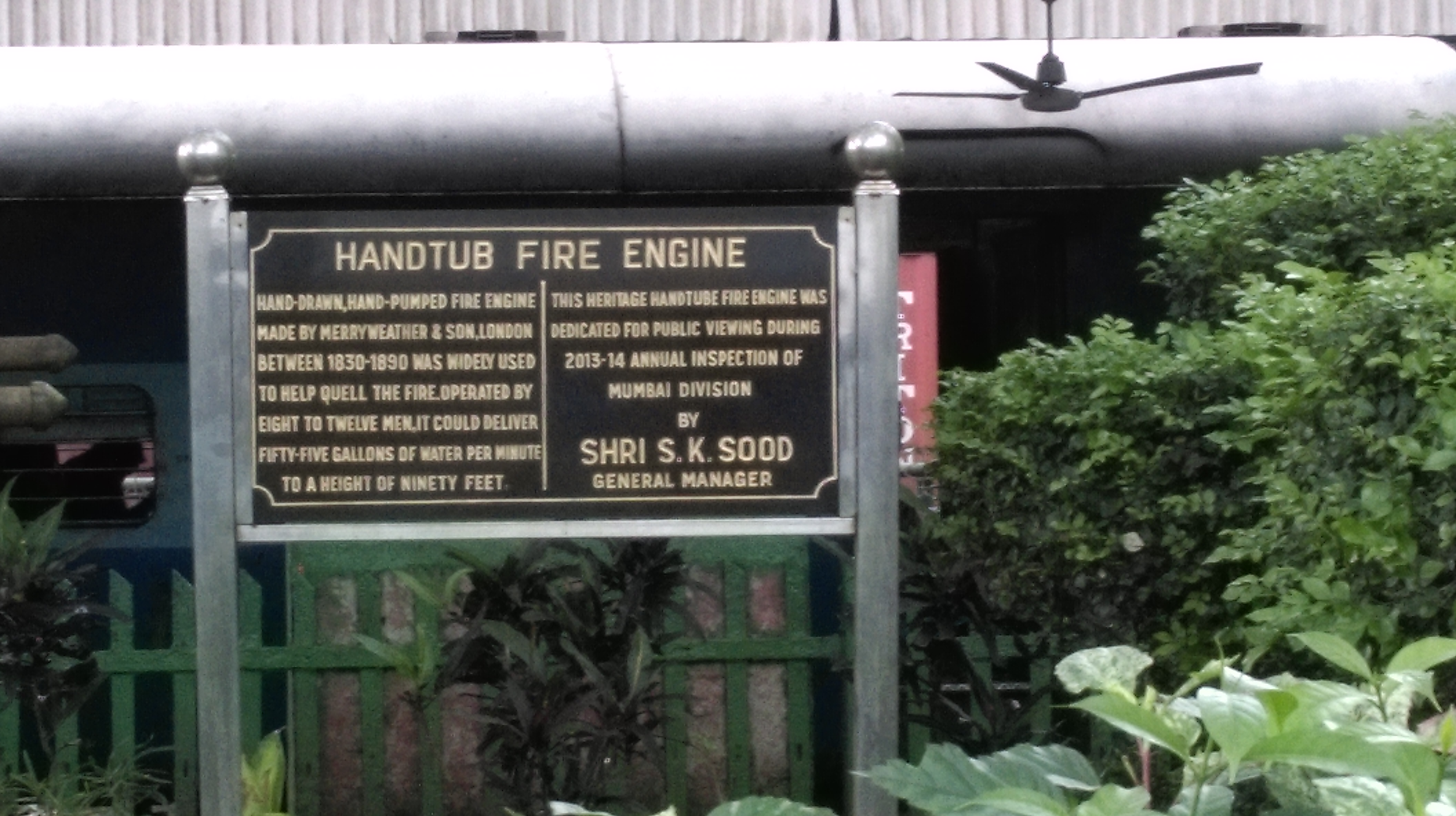
Igatpuri railway station – Ancient Fire Engine information board

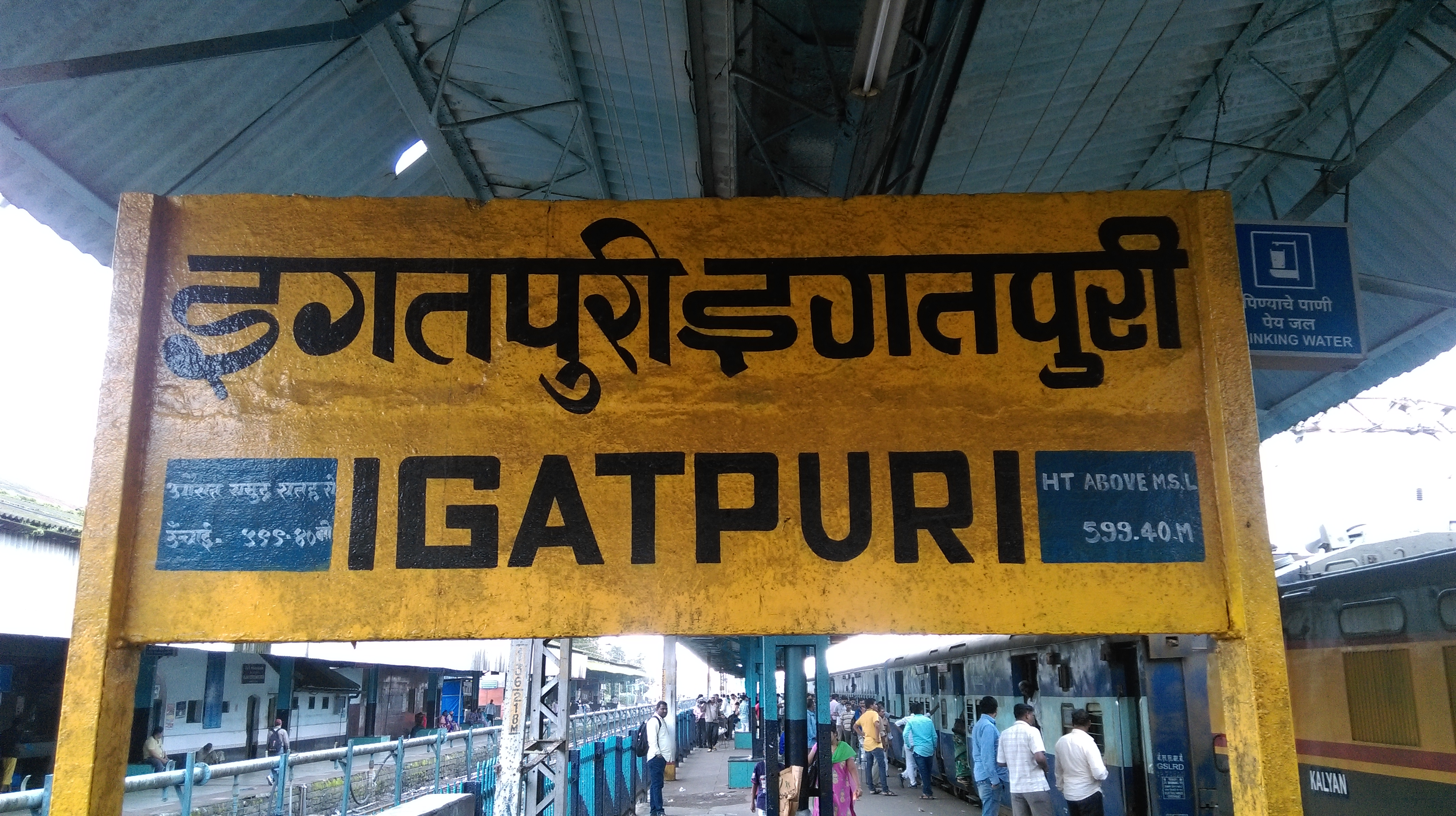
Igatpuri railway station – Station board

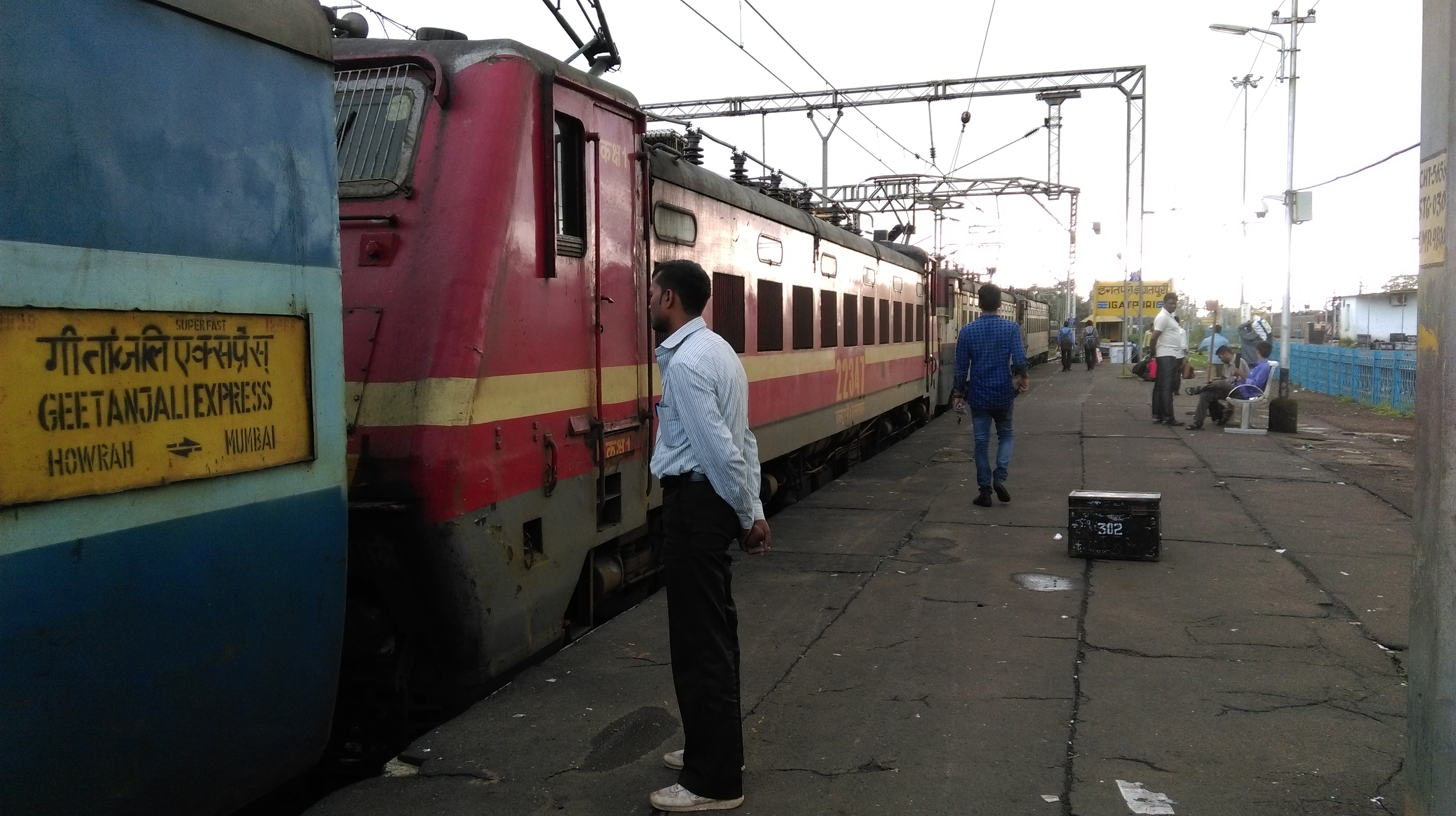
Gitanjali Express halted at Igatpuri railway station

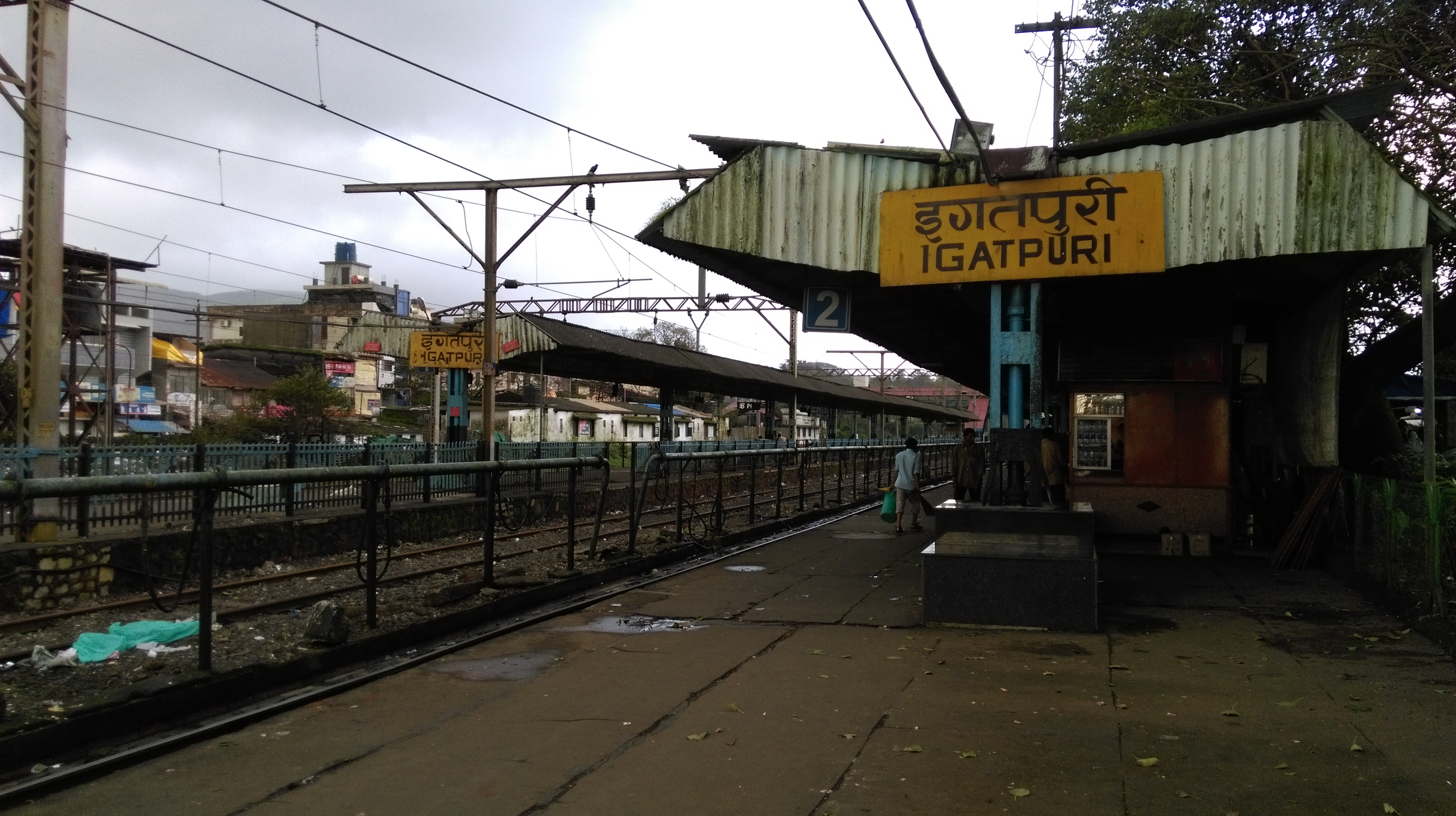
Igatpuri railway station – Station view

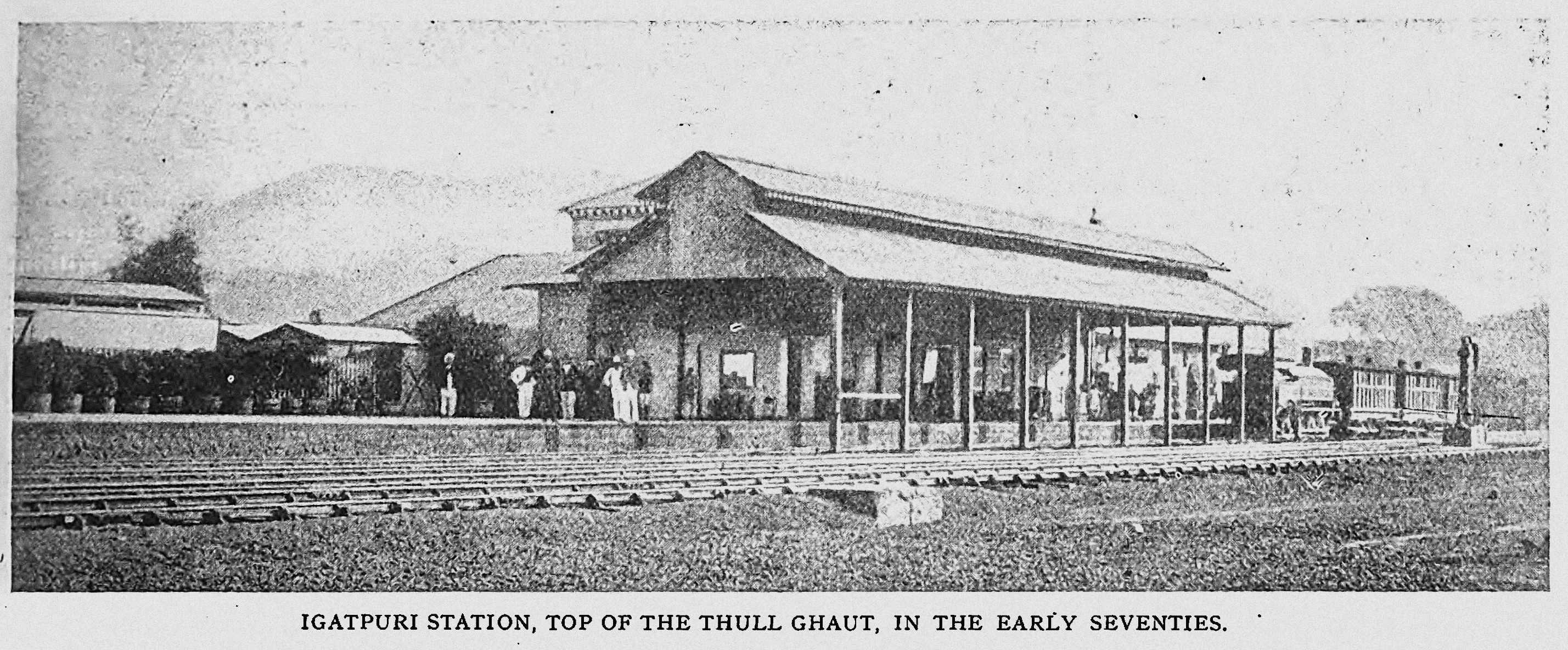
Igatpuri station in early 1870s
- Trains at Igatpuri
