= Chanda Fort railway station =

Railway Station in Maharashtra, India

- Indian Railways logo

General information
- Location: Chandrapur, Chandrapur district, Maharashtra; India
- Coordinates: 19.9403°N 79.3126°E
- Elevation: 191 metres (627 ft)
- System: Indian Railways station
- Owner: Indian Railways
- Line: Gondia–Nagbhid–Balharshah line
- Platforms: 1+ 2(under construction)
- Tracks: 5
- Connections: Auto stand

Construction
- Structure type: Standard (on-ground station)
- Parking: Yes
- Cycle facilities: No
- Accessible: Yes

Other information
- Status: Functioning
- Station code: CAF
- Fare zone: South East Central
Location
- Location within Maharashtra Location within India

Chanda Fort Railway Station (station code: CAF) is one of the two main railway stations serving Chandrapur city in Chandrapur district in Maharashtra state in India. It is under Nagpur SEC railway division of South East Central Railway zone of Indian Railways. It is located on Gondia–Nagbhid–Balharshah line of Indian Railways.

It is located at 191 m above sea level and has a single platform. As of 2018, 10 trains stop at this station.

== History ==
The Gondia–Nagbhir–Nagpur line was opened for traffic in 1908. The Nagbhir–Rajoli line was opened in 1913 and extended up to Chanda Fort. Work for conversion to broad gauge of the 240 km (149 mi) narrow-gauge Gondia–Chanda Fort line started in December 1992. The fourth phase covering Nagbhir–Chanda Fort section was opened on 13 January 1999 and the Chanda Fort–Balharshah section was opened from 2 July 1999.

The Ramagundam–Balharshah–Wardha–Nagpur sector was electrified in 1988–89. The Gondia–Nagbhir–Balharshah line was electrified in 2018.

== Amenities ==
Amenities at Chandrapur Fort railway station include: computerized reservation office and a waiting room.

Preceding station	Indian Railways	Following station
Balharshah Junction towards ?	South East Central Railway zone Gondia–Nagbhir–Balharshah line	Chichpalli towards ?
