= Madan Mahal railway station =

Railway station in Madhya Pradesh

Madan Mahal
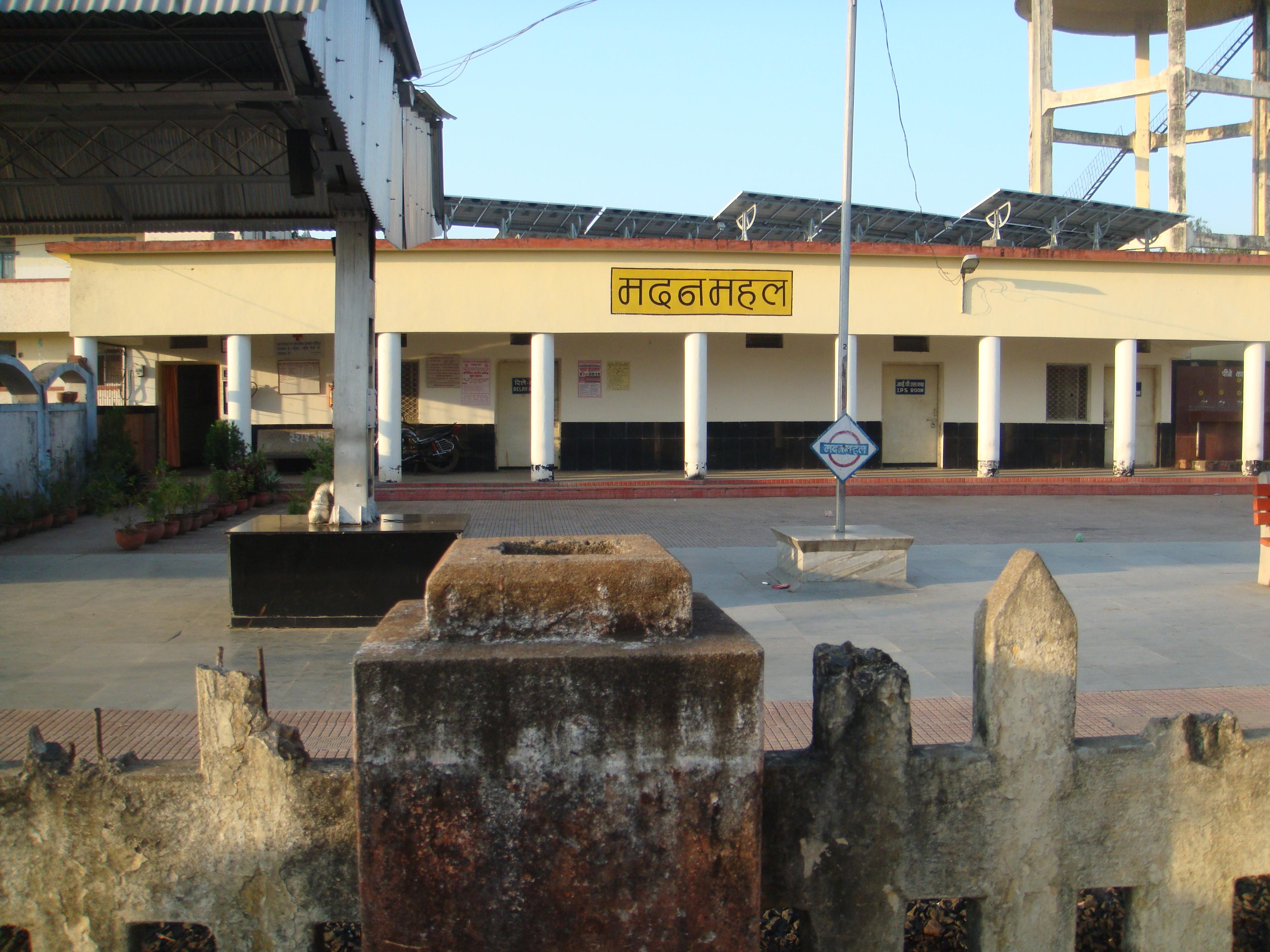

General information
- Location: Jabalpur, Madhya Pradesh; India
- Coordinates: 23°09′36″N 79°55′15″E
- Elevation: 392.860 metres (1,288.91 ft)
- System: Indian Railways station
- Owner: Indian Railways
- Platforms: 4
- Tracks: 4
- Connections: Taxi Stand, Auto Stand

Construction
- Parking: Available

Other information
- Status: Active
- Station code: MML
- Zone(s): West Central Railway
- Division(s): Jabalpur

Services
Preceding station	Indian Railways	Following station
Jabalpur junction railway station towards ?	West Central Railway zone Jabalpur–Bhusaval section	Kachhpura towards ?
Location

Madan Mahal Station (station code: MML) is a B category secondary main railway station of Jabalpur, Madhya Pradesh. The railway station is ISO 14001:2015 certified. It is one of the first pink railway station of India. An extension of the platform is undergoing which would make it the 7th longest platform in India of length 750m approx.

== History ==
It comes under West Central Railway zone and is 3 km away from the zonal headquarters at Jabalpur which serves as the headquarters for West Central Railways. Many Express and Passenger trains halt in Madan Mahal station.

The station is maintained with all basic facilities and carries a heavy passenger load. It comes in the Itarsi–Jabalpur route and has connectivity to almost all the major places.

== Gallery ==
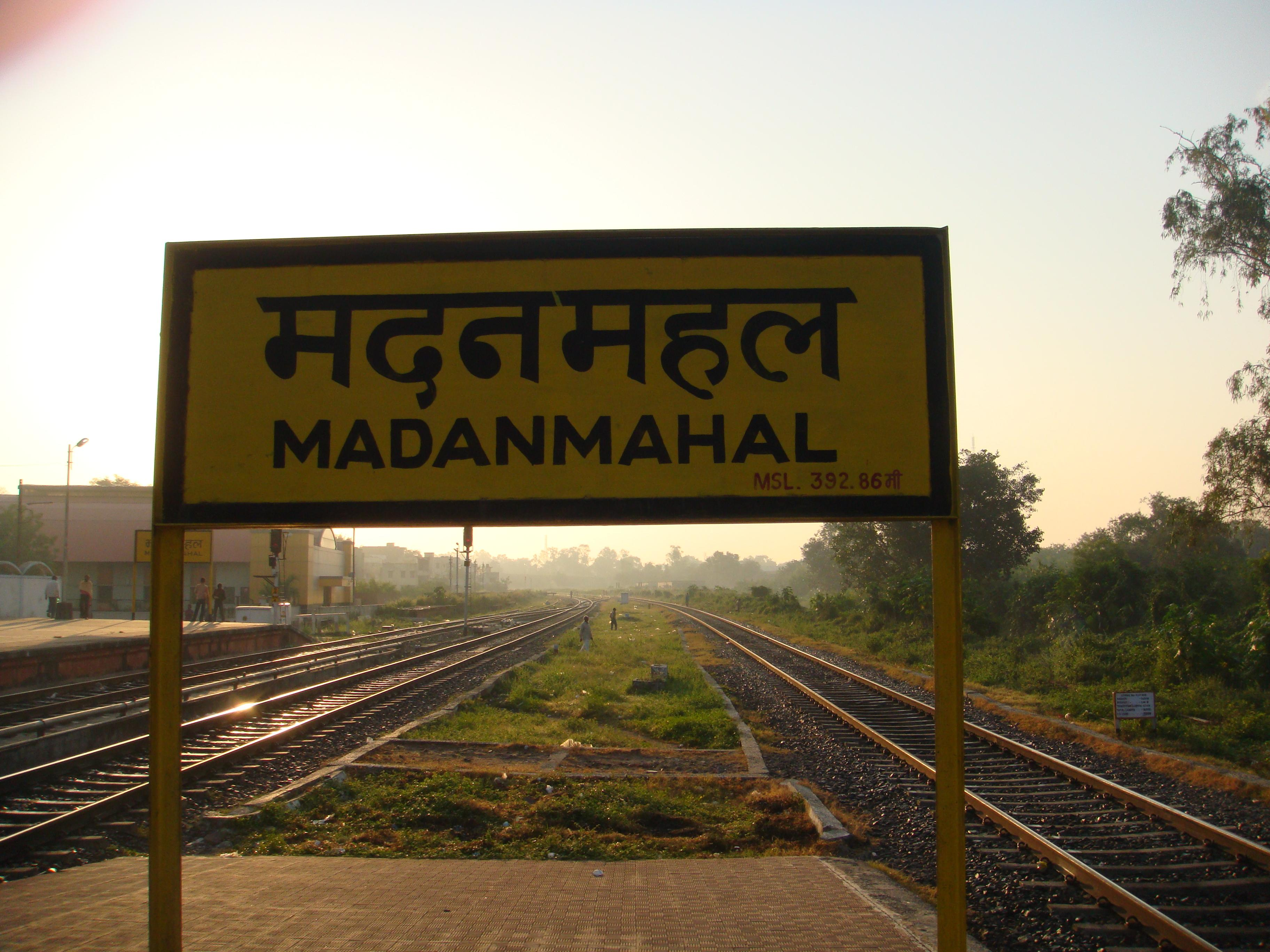
Madan Mahal station board

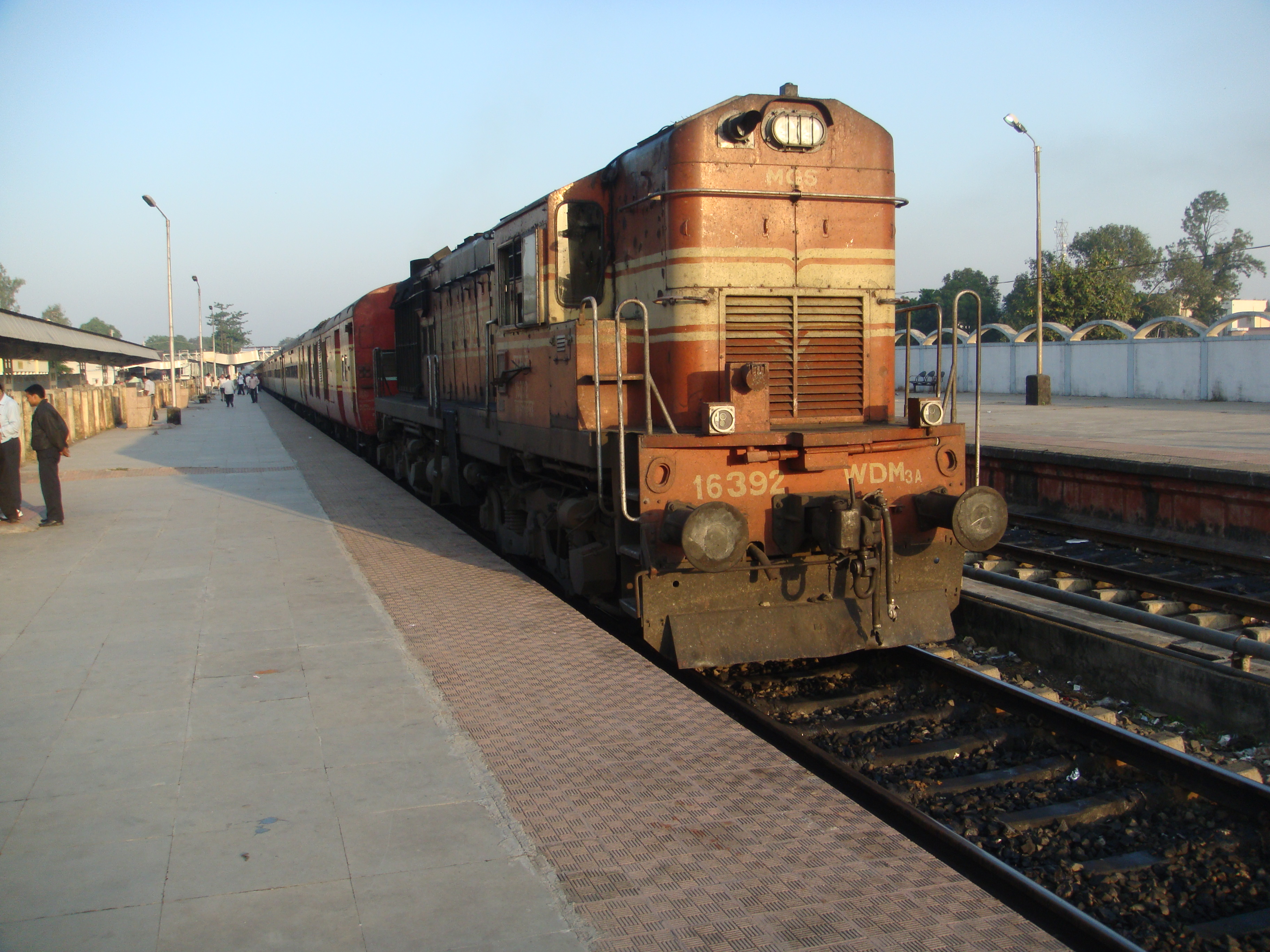
WDM 3A with 12293 Allahabad Duronto Express at Madan Mahal railway station

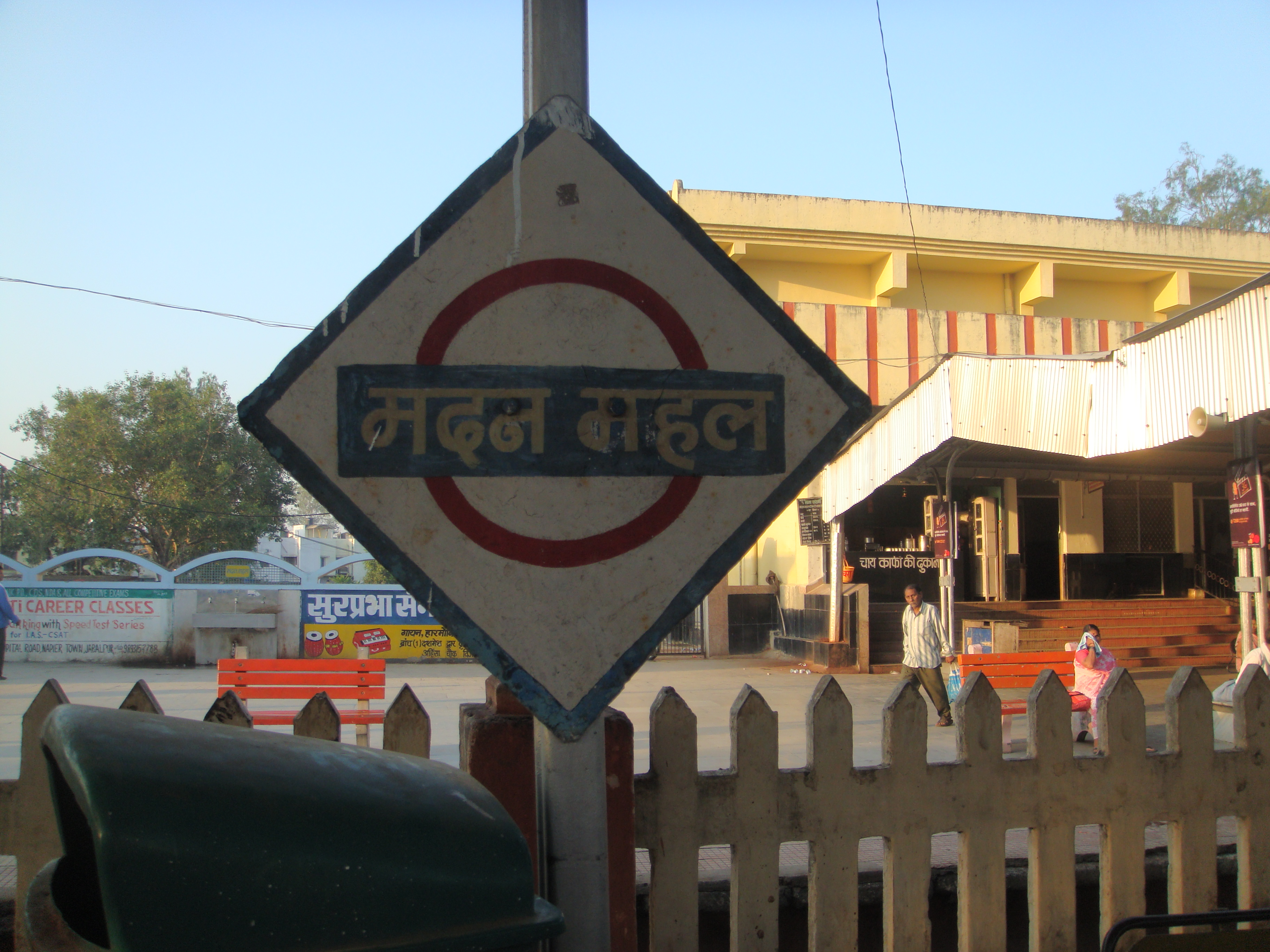
Madan Mahal platform board
