= Satpura Railway =

Overview
- Owner: Indian Railways
- Locale: Madhya Pradesh, Maharashtra

Service
- System: Steam and diesel
- Operator(s): South East Central Railway & West Central Railway
- Depot(s): Nainpur, Jabalpur

History
- Opened: 1903 (narrow gauge); 2018 (broad gauge)
- Closed: 2015 (narrow gauge)

Technical
- Line length: Jabalpur-Nainpur-Gondia: 236.5 kilometres (147.0 mi); Chhindwara - Nainpur - Mandla Fort: 183.0 kilometres (113.7 mi))
- Track length: 419.5 kilometres (260.7 mi)
- Track gauge: 1903 to 2015: 2 ft 6 in (762 mm); 2018 to present: 5 ft 6 in (1,676 mm)
- Operating speed: 50 kilometres per hour (31 mph) (narrow gauge); 90 kilometres per hour (56 mph) (broad gauge)

The Satpura Railway was a 2 ft 6 in (762 mm) narrow-gauge railway in the states of Madhya Pradesh and Maharashtra in central India.

== History ==
After the Great Famine of 1876–78 in central India, the Bengal Nagpur Railway began planning to open a low-cost railway track that would unite the region, allowing both access to the agricultural and mineral resources of the region, further safeguarding the inhabitants should another famine arise. Nainpur was the focal point of the network and was even bestowed with the prestige of being a divisional headquarters for some time. The lines came up in the early years of the 20th century.

The first portion of the Gondia–Nainpur line was opened on 13 April 1903, Nainpur and Chhindwara were connected in 1904 and Jabalpur in 1905. The Chhindwara –Pench Coalfield line came up in 1906 to 07 and the Nainpur–Mandla Fort line in 1909. The extensive network of 2 ft 6 in (762 mm) gauge tracks measured just over 1,000 km.

== Conversion to broad gauge ==
The Satpura Railway is fully made into 1,676 mm (5 ft 6 in) broad gauge. The alignment follows the old 762 mm (2 ft 6 in) narrow gauge line in most of the route excepting the hilly regions. Amla - Chhindwara - Nainpur - Mandla Fort section fully follows the old 762 mm (2 ft 6 in) narrow gauge alignment. But Jabalpur - Nainpur - Balaghat - Gondia section has different alignment in some parts. The section between Gondia and Balaghat was converted to broad gauge in 2005 and 2006 connecting Balaghat to India's national network for the first time. Work was completed on converting the Balaghat – Nainpur - Jabalpur section to broad gauge in 2021. The narrow-gauge trains running between Jabalpur and Balaghat were stopped in October 2015 and the track was closed for gauge conversion. The 85.1 kilometres (52.9 mi) broad-gauge track from Jabalpur to Ghunsore railway station was opened in September 2017 and the 35.1 kilometres (21.8 mi) track from Ghunsore to Nainpur opened in 2018.

The last work of 75.5 kilometres (46.9 mi) between Nainpur to Balaghat was expected to be operational in mid-2020, but due to COVID-19 pandemic it was delayed, while also converted into an electrified line for increased average speed. After that, it was started on 8 March 2021. The 183 kilometres (114 mi) long Chhindwara - Nainpur - Mandla Fort section is nearing completion with crs inspection happened on 24th of february 2023. Nainpur - Mandla Fort section being operational since 15 March 2021.
