= Nainpur =

- Municipality
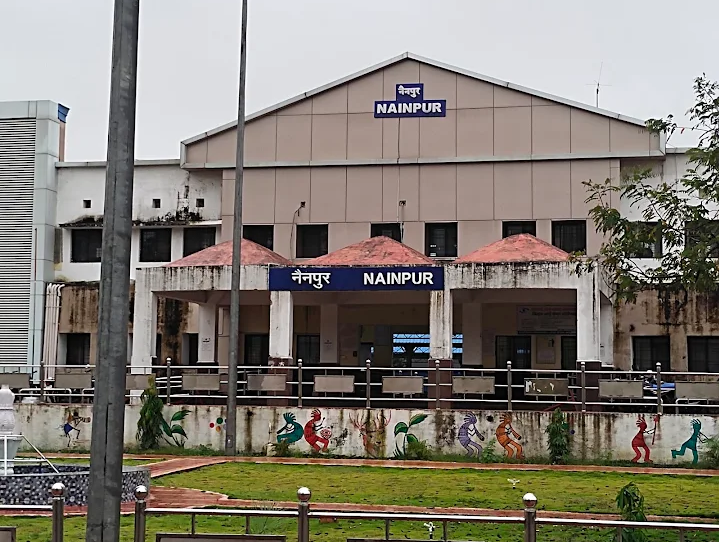
- Railway Station Nainpur

- Location in Madhya Pradesh, India Nainpur (India)
- Coordinates: 22.43°N 80.12°E
- Country: India
- State: Madhya Pradesh
- District: Mandla

Government
  - Type: Municipality
  - Body: Nainpur Municipality

Area
  - Total: 10.5 km^{2} (4.1 sq mi)
- Elevation: 447 m (1,467 ft)

Population (2011)
  - Total: 35,635
  - Density: 3,390/km^{2} (8,790/sq mi)

Languages
  - Official: Hindi
- Time zone: UTC+5:30 (IST)
- PIN: 481776
- Telephone code: 07646
- Vehicle registration: MP51 (MANDLA)
- Sex ratio: 961 ♂/♀

Nainpur is a town and Municipal City in the Mandla district of the Indian state of Madhya Pradesh.

== Geography ==
Nainpur is a Tehsil. It is located to the north of the Nainpur Forest Range, and borders the Bamhni Forest Range. Nainpur is bordered by the Chakor and the Thanwar rivers.

The town has a hot and dry climate. In the summer, temperatures can reach 44°C, while the winters offer temperatures of around 15°C. Between July and September, there is a heavy rainfall, brought on by the onset of the Southwestern monsoon.

== Demographics ==
According to the 2011 Indian census, Nainpur has a population of approximately 25,000 people. Males constitute 51% of the population. Nainpur has an average literacy rate of 75%, which is higher than the national average of 59.5%; male literacy is 81% and female literacy is 68%. In Nainpur, 12% of the population is under 6 years of age.

The town is divided into 15 wards; each ward is represented by a ward member.

== Transport ==
Nainpur is on the route to Seoni-Mandla Highway. The nearest airport is Jabalpur. It is also a railway junction connected to Jabalpur and Nagpur. The town has a narrow gauge rail museum.

Nearby picnic spots include Maaldhar, Siddhaghat, Ghoghra, Bhima Nala, Shikara, Thanwar Dam, and Kanha National Park.

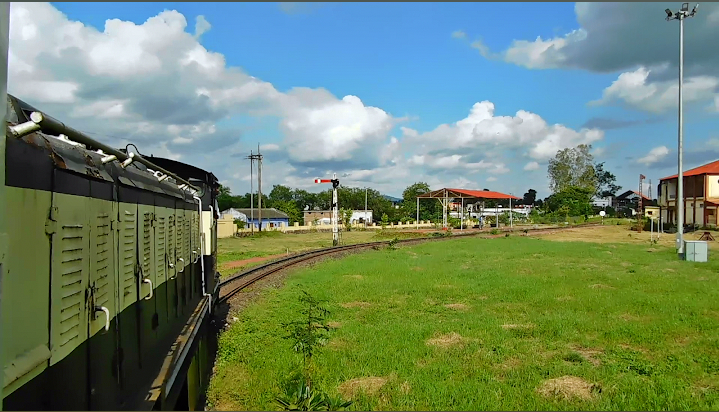
Railway Museum Nainpur
