= Udhna Junction railway station =

Railway station in Gujarat, India

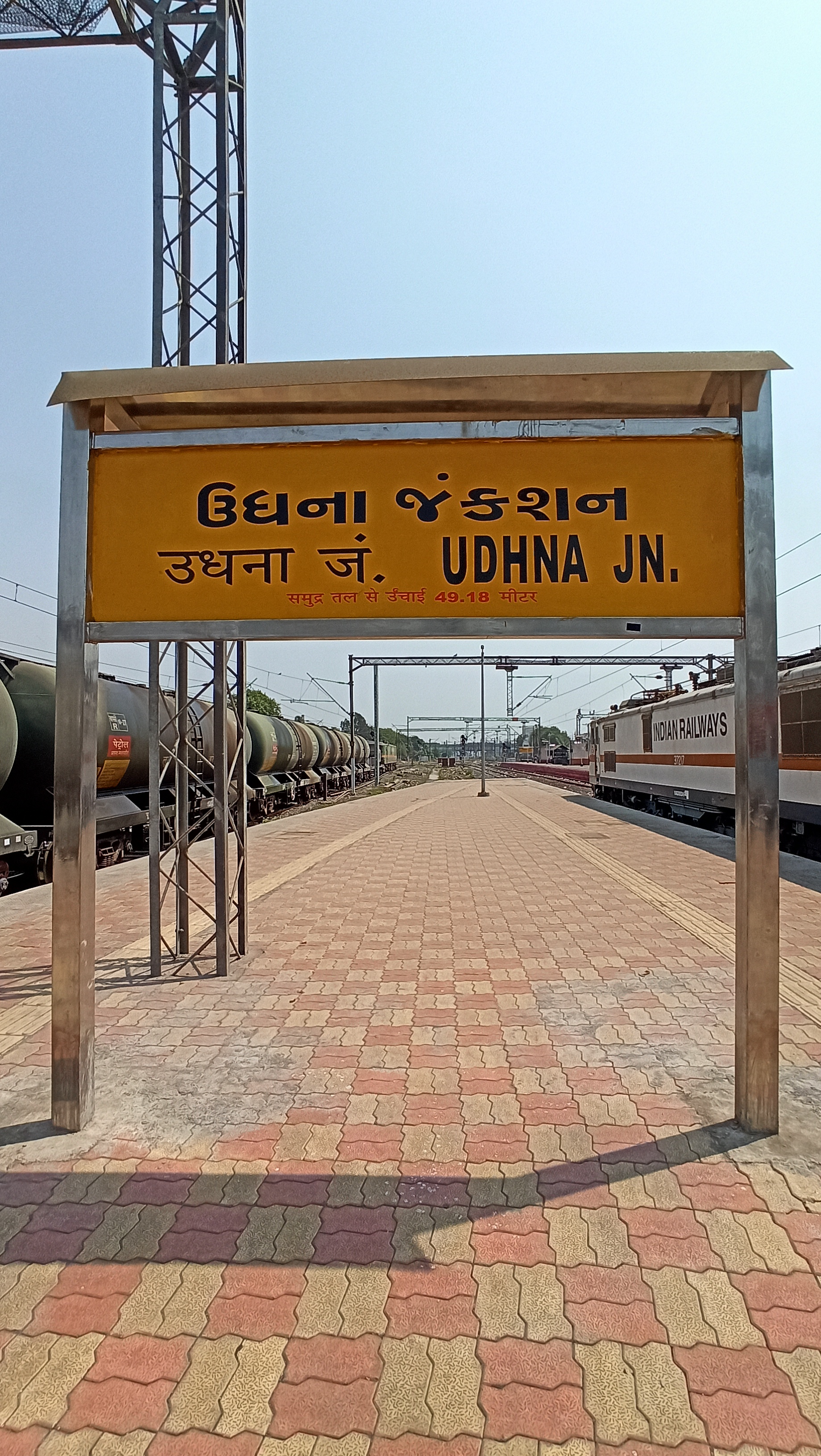

General information
- Location: Udhna, Surat City, Gujarat; India
- Coordinates: 21°10′14″N 72°51′06″E
- Elevation: 14 metres (46 ft)
- System: Indian Railways station
- Owner: Ministry of Railways, Indian Railways
- Operator: Western Railway
- Lines: New Delhi–Mumbai main line Udhna–Jalgaon line Ahmedabad–Mumbai main line
- Platforms: 6
- Tracks: 7

Construction
- Structure type: Standard (on ground station)
- Parking: Available

Other information
- Status: Functioning
- Station code: UDN
- Zone(s): Western Railway
- Division(s): Mumbai WR

Services
Preceding station	Indian Railways	Following station
Surat towards ?	New Delhi–Mumbai main line	Bhestan towards ?
Surat towards ?	Udhna–Jalgaon line	Niyol towards ?
Location
- Location within India Location within Gujarat

Udhna Junction railway station is a railway station serving Udhna town, in Surat City, Gujarat State of India. It is under Mumbai WR railway division of Western Railway zone of Indian Railways. It is located on New Delhi–Mumbai main line of the Indian Railways.

It is located at 14 m above sea level and has three platforms. As of 2016, electrified double Broad Gauge railway line exist and at this station, 59 trains stops, 3 trains originates and 3 trains terminate. Surat Airport, is at distance of 13 kilometres.

== Major trains ==
Following trains start from Udhna Junction railway station:

- Udhna–Brahmapur Amrit Bharat Express
- Udhna–Danapur Express
- Jaynagar–Udhna Antyodaya Express
- Udhna–Banaras Express

Following trains halt at Udhna Junction railway station:

- Shramik Express
- Bandra Terminus–Saharsa Humsafar Express
- Howrah–Ahmedabad Superfast Express
- Gorakhpur–Bandra Terminus Express (via Barhni)
- Udyog Karmi Express
- Gujarat Queen
- Flying Ranee
- Tapti Ganga Express
- Surat–Bhagalpur Express
- Surat–Amravati Express
- Navjeevan Express
- Saurashtra Express

== Gallery ==
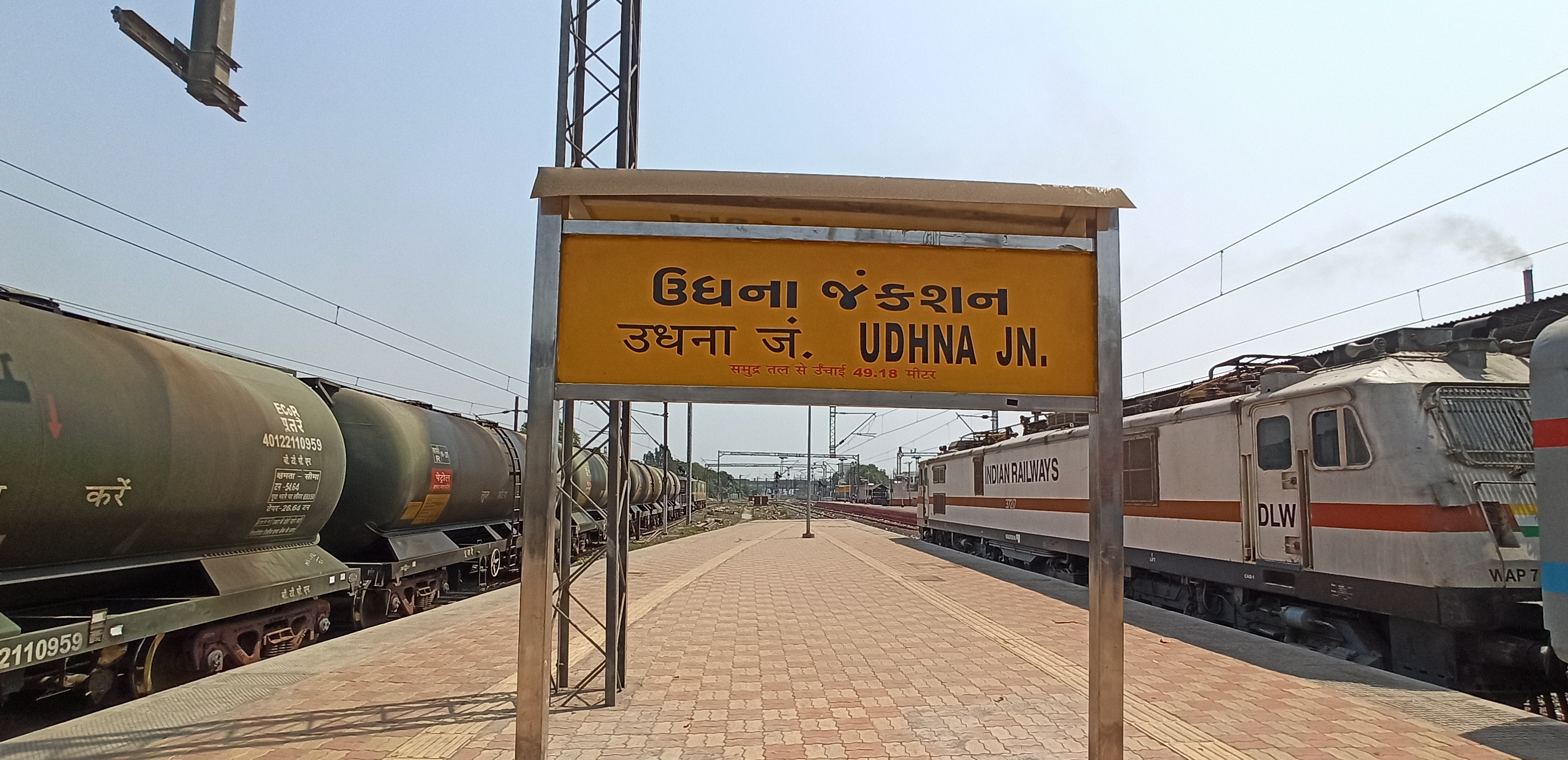
Udhna Junction Platform Board

Udhna Junction Platform Board

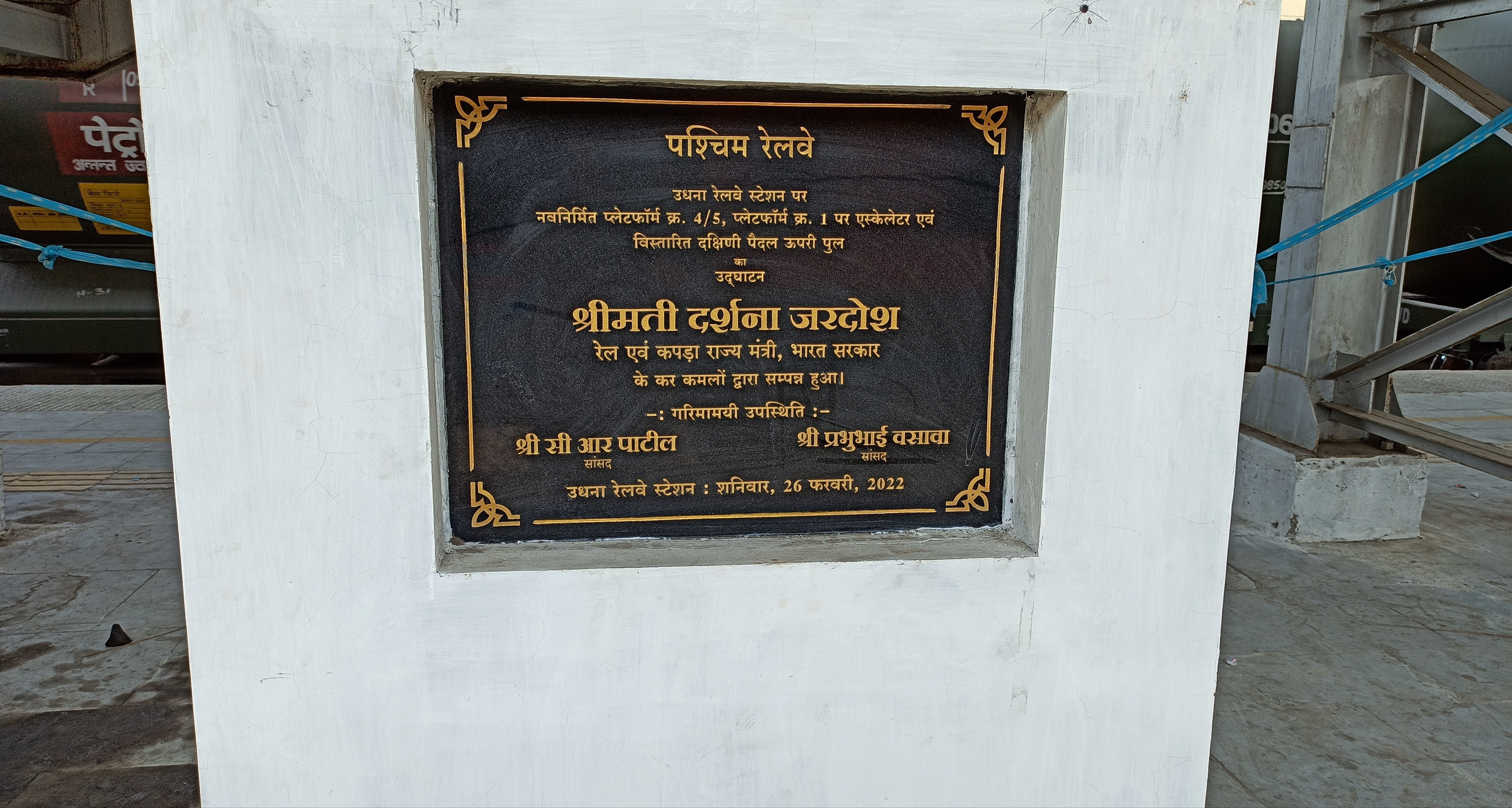
Platform 4 and 5 Inauguration Plate

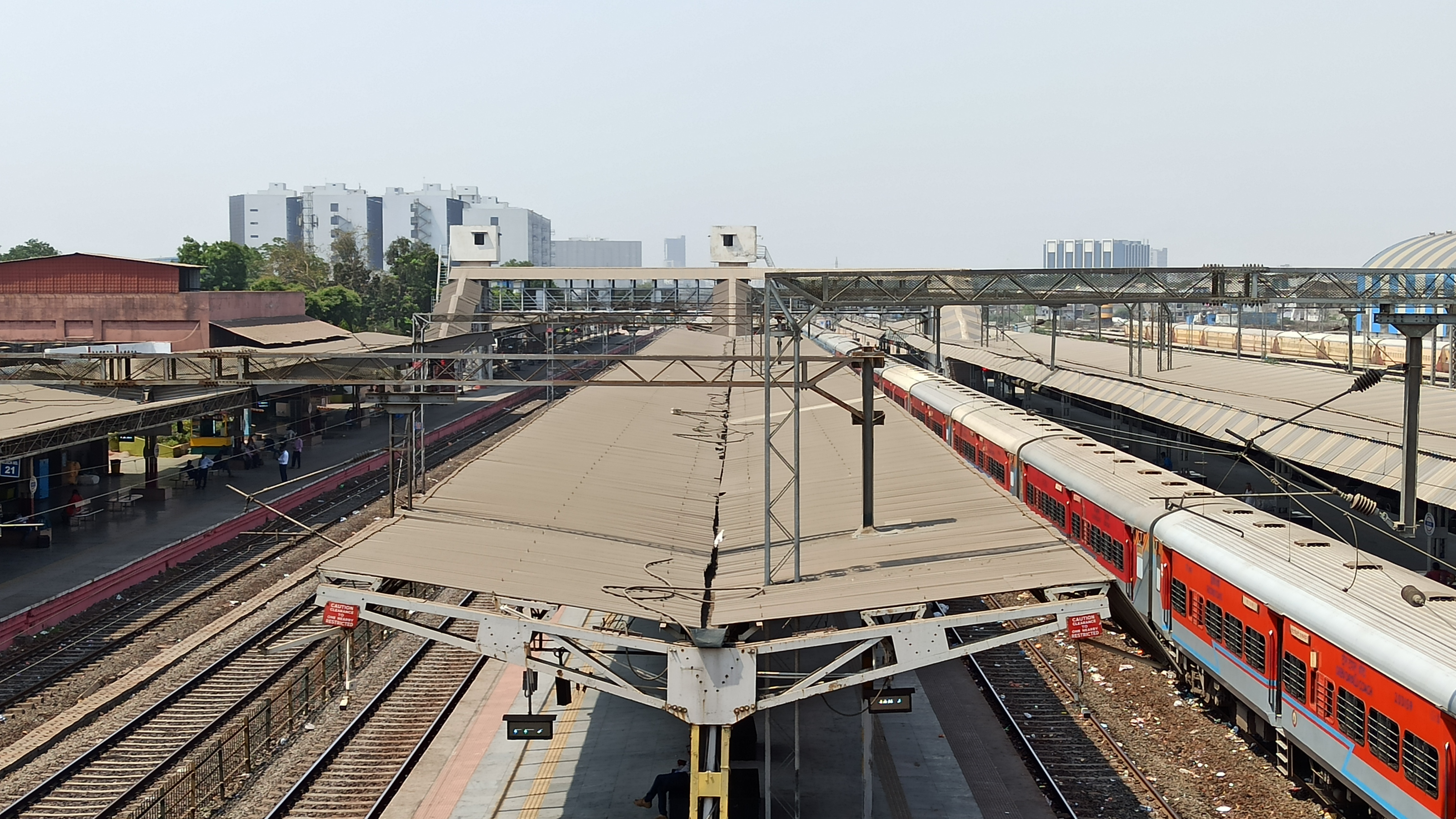
Udhna Station

== See also ==
- List of tourist attractions in Surat
