= Udhna–Danapur Express =

Train in India

Udhna–Danapur Superfast Express
Overview
- Service type: Superfast Express
- First service: 22 August 2015; 10 years ago
- Current operator: Western Railway

Route
- Termini: Udhna Junction (UDN); Danapur (DNR)
- Stops: 16
- Distance travelled: 1,593 km (990 mi)
- Average journey time: 27 hrs 15 mins
- Service frequency: Bi-weekly (Note: Runs two days in a week for every direction.)
- Train number: 20933 / 20934

On-board services
- Classes: AC 2 tier, AC 3 tier, Sleeper class, General Unreserved
- Seating arrangements: Yes
- Sleeping arrangements: Yes
- Catering facilities: On-board catering, E-catering
- Observation facilities: Large windows
- Baggage facilities: Available
- Other facilities: Below the seats

Technical
- Rolling stock: LHB coach
- Track gauge: 1,676 mm (5 ft 6 in)
- Operating speed: 58 km/h (36 mph) average including halts.
- Rake sharing: Rake sharing with 12911/12912 Valsad–Haridwar Superfast Express

The 20933 / 20934 Udhna–Danapur Superfast Express is an Superfast Express train belonging to Western Railway zone that runs between Udhna Junction and Danapur in India. It is currently being operated with 20933/20934 train numbers on a bi-weekly basis.

== Service ==
- The 20933/Udhna–Danapur Express has an average speed of 58 km/h and covers 1593 km in 27h 15m.
- The 20934/Danapur–Udhna Express has an average speed of 56 km/h and covers 1593 km in 28h 25m.

== Route & halts ==
The important halts of the train are:

- Udhna Junction
- Nandurbar
- Jalgaon Junction
- Bhusaval Junction
- Khandwa Junction
- Itarsi Junction
- Pipariya
- Jabalpur Junction
- Katni Junction
- Satna Junction
- Manikpur Junction
- Prayagraj Chheoki
- Gyanpur Road
- Varanasi Junction
- Pt. DD Upadhyaya Junction (Mughalsarai)
- Buxar
- Ara Junction
- Danapur

== Coach composition ==
The train has standard LHB rakes with a maximum speed of 130 kmph. The train consists of 21 coaches:

- 2 AC II Tier
- 7 AC III Tier
- 7 Sleeper coaches
- 4 General Unreserved
- 1 Seating cum Luggage Rake
- 1 EOG

== Traction ==
The route is now fully electrified. Both trains are hauled by a Vadodara Loco Shed-based WAP-7 electric locomotive from Udhna Junction to Danapur and vice versa.

== Direction reversal ==
Train reverses its direction 1 times:

- Prayagraj Junction

== Rake sharing ==
The train shares its rake with;

- 20929/20930 Udhna–Banaras Express
- 12911/12912 Valsad–Haridwar Superfast Express.

== See also ==
- Udhna Junction railway station
- Danapur railway station
- Surat–Chhapra Tapti Ganga Express
- Surat–Muzaffarpur Express
- Surat–Bhagalpur Express
