= Surat–Malda Town Express =

Train in India

Overview
- Service type: Express
- First service: 9 July 2012; 14 years ago
- Current operator: Eastern Railway

Route
- Termini: Surat (ST); Malda Town (MLDT)
- Stops: 30
- Distance travelled: 2,137 km (1,328 mi)
- Average journey time: 40 hrs 30 mins
- Service frequency: Weekly
- Train number: 13425 / 13426

On-board services
- Classes: AC 2 Tier, AC 3 Tier, Sleeper class, General Unreserved
- Seating arrangements: Yes
- Sleeping arrangements: Yes
- Catering facilities: On-board catering E-catering
- Observation facilities: Large windows
- Baggage facilities: Available

Technical
- Rolling stock: LHB coach
- Track gauge: 1,676 mm (5 ft 6 in); Broad Gauge
- Operating speed: 52 km/h (32 mph) average including halts

The 13425 / 13426 Surat–Malda Town Express is an Express train running between Surat of Gujarat and Malda Town of West Bengal via Dhanbad, Asansol, Rampurhat.

It operates as train number 13425 from Malda Town to Surat and as train number 13426 in the reverse direction, serving the states of Gujarat, Maharashtra, Chhattisgarh, Odisha, Jharkhand and West Bengal.

== Coach composite ==
The train consists of 22 LHB coaches;

- 1 AC II Tier
- 5 AC III Tier
- 8 Sleeper class
- 6 General Unreserved
- 2 Seating cum Luggage Rake.

== Services ==
13425 Malda Town–Surat Express covers the distance of 2137 km in 40 hours 20 mins (53 km/h) and in 41 hours 40 mins as 13426 Surat–Malda Town Express (51 km/h).

As the average speed of the train is below 55 km/h (35 mph), as per Indian Railway rules, its fare does not include a Superfast surcharge.

== Route and halts ==
The important halts of the train are:

- Surat
- Nandurbar
- Jalgaon
- Bhusaval
- Akola
- Badnera
- Nagpur
- Durg
- Raipur
- Bilaspur
- Jharsuguda
- Rourkela
- Ranchi
- Bokaro Steel City
- Dhanbad
- Asansol Junction
- Durgapur
- Siuri
- Rampurhat Junction
- New Farakka
- Malda Town

Note: Bold letters indicates Major Railway Stations/Major Cities.

== Direction reversal ==
The train used to reverse direction at Durgapur station but for many days and as of now it is changing direction at;

- Andal Jn.

== Traction ==
The route is fully electrified, it is hauled by a Howrah Loco Shed-based WAP-7 electric locomotive from end to end.

== See also ==
- Tapti Ganga Express
- Shramik Express
- Udyog Karmi Express
