= Surat–Bhagalpur Express =

Train in India

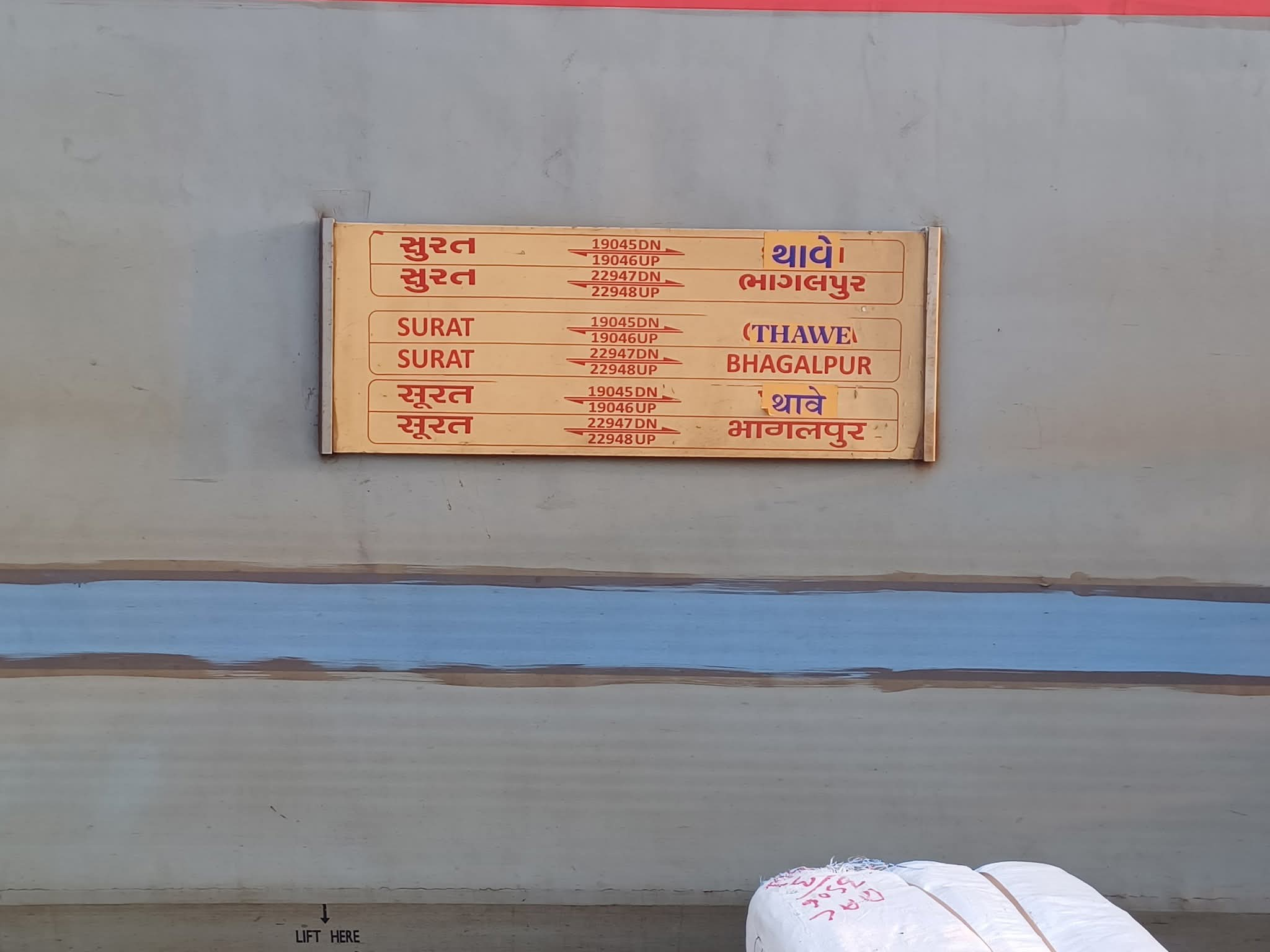
- Surat-Bhagalpur Express train board.

Overview
- Service type: Superfast
- First service: 1 January 1998; 27 years ago
- Current operator: Western Railway

Route
- Termini: Surat (ST); Bhagalpur (BGP)
- Stops: 35
- Distance travelled: 1,823 km (1,133 mi)
- Average journey time: 33 hrs 15 mins
- Service frequency: Bi-weekly
- Train number: 22947 / 22948

On-board services
- Classes: AC 2 Tier, AC 3 Tier, Sleeper Class, General Unreserved
- Seating arrangements: Yes
- Sleeping arrangements: Yes
- Catering facilities: Pantry car, On-board catering, E-catering
- Observation facilities: Large windows
- Baggage facilities: Available
- Other facilities: Below the seats

Technical
- Rolling stock: LHB coach
- Track gauge: 1,676 mm (5 ft 6 in); Broad Gauge
- Operating speed: 55 km/h (34 mph) average including halts.
Route map
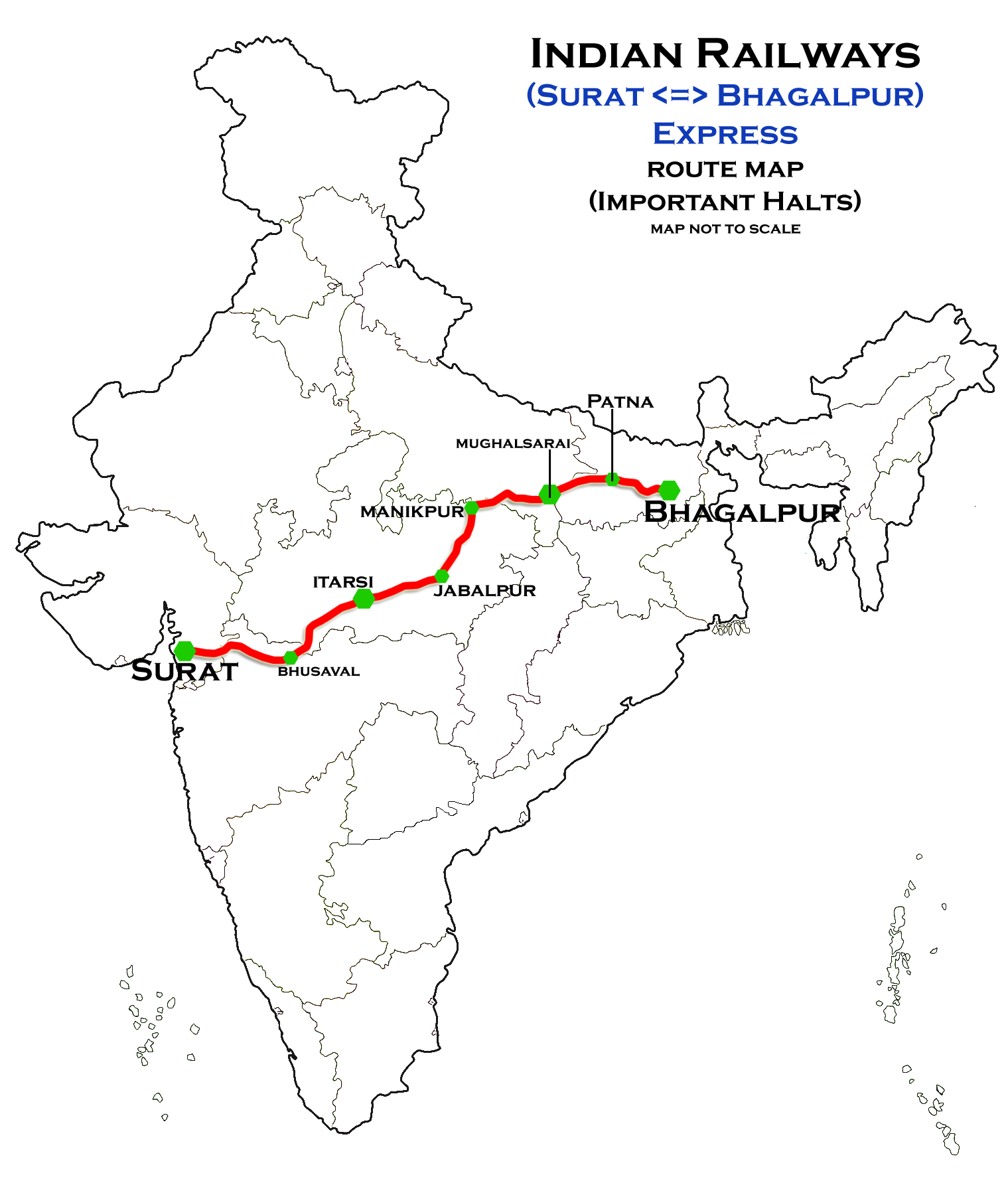

The 22947 / 22948 Surat–Bhagalpur Express is a superfast express train running between Surat of Gujarat and Bhagalpur Junction of Bihar. It is also known as Tapti Ganga Superfast Express.

It operates as train number 22947 from Surat to Bhagalpur Junction and as train number 22948 in the reverse direction, serving the states of Gujarat, Maharashtra, Madhya Pradesh, Uttar Pradesh and Bihar

== Coach composition ==
The train consists of 22 coaches:

- 2 AC II Tier
- 6 AC III Tier
- 8 Sleeper class
- 1 Pantry car
- 3 General Unreserved
- 1 EOG cum Luggage Rake
- 1 Seating cum Luggage Rake

== Services ==
22947 Surat–Bhagalpur Tapti Ganga Superfast Express covers the distance of 1822 km in 33 hours 10 mins (55 km/h) and in 33 hours 15 mins as 22948 Bhagalpur–Surat Tapti Ganga Superfast Express (55 km/h).

As the average speed of the train is 55 km/h (35 mph), as per Indian Railway rules, its fare includes a Superfast surcharge.

== Route ==
The 22947 / 22948 Surat–Bhagalpur Tapti Ganga Superfast Express runs from Surat via Udhna Junction, Nandurbar, Jalgaon Junction, Bhusaval Junction, Khandwa Junction, Itarsi Junction, Jabalpur Junction, Katni Junction, Satna Junction, Manikpur Junction, Prayagraj Chheoki Junction, Mirzapur, Pt. DD Upadhyaya Junction (Mughalsarai), Ara Junction, Patna Junction, Kiul Junction, Jamalpur Junction to Bhagalpur Junction.

== Rake sharing ==
The train shares its rake with 19045/19046 Tapti Ganga Express

== Traction ==
Both trains are hauled by a Vadodara Loco Shed or Valsad Loco Shed-based WAP-7 electric locomotive on its entire journey.

== See also ==
- Shramik Express
- Udhna–Banaras Express
- Udhna–Danapur Express
- Jaynagar–Udhna Antyodaya Express
