= Lorha railway station =

Railway station in Madhya Pradesh

Lorha

General information
- Location: National Highway 78, Pali, Lorha, Umaria district, Madhya Pradesh; India
- Coordinates: 23.581228°N 80.751613°E
- Elevation: 457 metres (1,499 ft)
- System: Indian Railways station
- Owner: Indian Railways
- Operator: South East Central Railway
- Line: Bilaspur–Katni line
- Platforms: 3
- Tracks: 2 (Double electrified BG)

Construction
- Structure type: Standard (on-ground station)
- Parking: yes
- Cycle facilities: yes

Other information
- Status: Functioning
- Station code: LOA
- Zone(s): South East Central Railway zone
- Division(s): Bilaspur

History
- Former names: Bengal Nagpur Railway

Services
Preceding station	Indian Railways	Following station
Chandia Road towards ?	South East Central Railway zone Bilaspur–Katni line	Umaria towards ?
Location

Lorha railway station is a railway station on Bilaspur–Katni line under Bilaspur railway division of South East Central Railway Zone of Indian Railways. The railway station is situated beside National Highway 78 at Pali, Lorha in Umaria district in the Indian state of Madhya Pradesh.

== History ==
Katni to Umaria railway line was constructed in 1886 as Katni–Umaria Provincial State Railway and in 1891 the line was extended to Bilaspur Junction by Bengal Nagpur Railway.
