= Udhna–Banaras Express =

Train in India

Udhna–Banaras Superfast Express
Overview
- Service type: Superfast Express
- First service: 14 September 2012; 12 years ago
- Current operator(s): Western Railway

Route
- Termini: Udhna Junction (UDN); Banaras (BSBS)
- Stops: 13
- Distance travelled: 1,401 km (871 mi)
- Average journey time: 24 hrs 25 mins
- Service frequency: Weekly
- Train number(s): 20929 / 20930

On-board services
- Class(es): AC 2 Tier, AC 3 Tier, Sleeper Class, General Unreserved
- Seating arrangements: Yes
- Sleeping arrangements: Yes
- Catering facilities: On-board catering, E-catering
- Observation facilities: Large windows
- Baggage facilities: Available

Technical
- Rolling stock: LHB coach
- Track gauge: 1,676 mm (5 ft 6 in); Broad Gauge
- Operating speed: 57 km/h (35 mph) average including halts.
- Rake sharing: Rake sharing with 20933/20934 Udhna–Danapur Express

The 20929 / 20930 Udhna–Banaras Superfast Express is an Superfast Express train of Indian Railways connecting Udhna Junction and Banaras. The train was introduced in rail budget 2012–13.

It operates as train number 20929 from Udhna Junction to Banaras and as train number 20930 in the reverse direction, serving the states of Gujarat, Maharashtra, Madhya Pradesh and Uttar Pradesh.

== Coaches ==
The 19057 / 58 Udhna–Banaras Express has 1 AC 2 tier, 1 AC 3 tier, 8 Sleeper class, 6 General Unreserved & 2 SLR (Seating cum Luggage Rake) coaches. It does not carry a pantry car.

As is customary with most train services in India, coach composition may be amended at the discretion of Indian Railways depending on demand.

== Service ==
19057 Udhna–Banaras Express covers the distance of 1402 km in 26 hours 50 mins (52 km/h) and in 28 hours 10 mins as 19058 Banaras–Udhna Express. (51 km/h).

As the average speed of the train is below 55 km/h (34 mph), as per Indian Railways rules, its fare doesn't include a Superfast surcharge.

== Route & halts ==
The important halts of the train are:

- Udhna Junction
- Nandurbar
- Amalner
- Jalgaon
- Bhusaval
- Khandwa
- Itarsi Junction
- Jabalpur Junction
- Katni Junction
- Satna
- Manikpur Junction
- Prayagraj Chheoki
- Varanasi
- Banaras

== Traction ==
The entire route is now fully electrified. Both trains are hauled by a Vadodara Loco Shed-based WAP-7 electric locomotive from Udhna Junction to Banaras and vice versa.

== Timings ==
19057 Udhna–Banaras Express leaves Udhna Junction every Friday at 22:50 PM IST and reaches Banaras at 01:40 AM IST on Sunday.

19058 Banaras–Udhna Express leaves Banaras every Sunday at 04:50 AM IST and reaches Udhna Junction at 09:00 AM IST the next day.

== Rake sharing ==
The train shares its rake with 20933/20934 Udhna–Danapur Express.

== See also ==
- Tapti Ganga Express
- Surat–Muzaffarpur Express
- Surat–Bhagalpur Express
