= Birsinghpur railway station =

Railway station in Madhya Pradesh

Birsinghpur
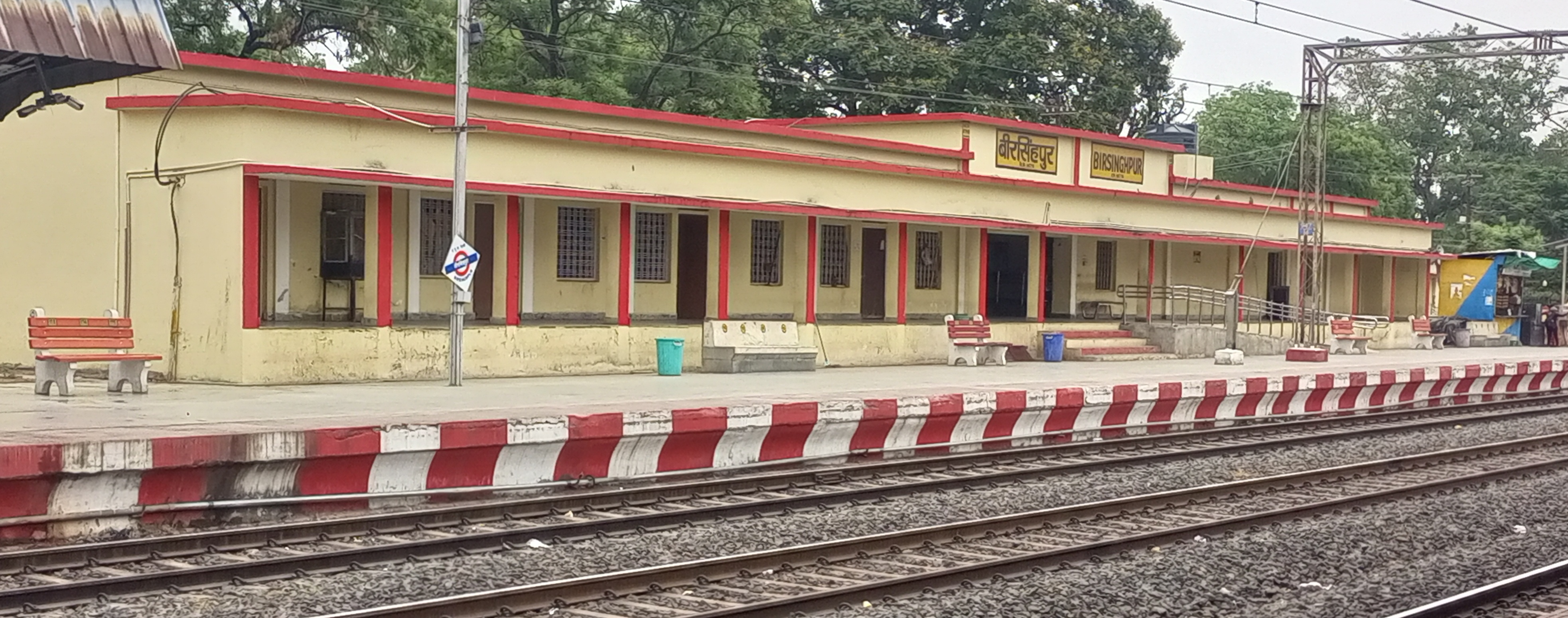
- Birsinghpur railway station

General information
- Location: National Highway 43, Pali Birsinghpur, Umaria district, Madhya Pradesh; India
- Coordinates: 23.367212°N 81.043353°E
- Elevation: 464 metres (1,522 ft)
- System: Indian Railways station
- Owner: Indian Railways
- Operator: South East Central Railway
- Line: Bilaspur–Katni line
- Platforms: 3
- Tracks: 2 (Double electrified BG)

Construction
- Structure type: Standard (on-ground station)
- Parking: yes
- Cycle facilities: yes

Other information
- Status: Functioning
- Station code: BRS
- Zone(s): South East Central Railway zone
- Division(s): Bilaspur

History
- Former names: Bengal Nagpur Railway

Services
Preceding station	Indian Railways	Following station
Nowrozabad towards ?	South East Central Railway zone Bilaspur–Katni line	Mudaria towards ?
Location

Birsinghpur railway station is a railway station on Bilaspur–Katni line under Bilaspur railway division of South East Central Railway Zone of Indian Railways. The railway station is situated beside National Highway 43 at Pali Birsinghpur in Umaria district in the Indian state of Madhya Pradesh.

== History ==
The railway line from Katni to Umaria was constructed in 1886 as the Katni–Umaria Provincial State Railway. In 1891, the line was extended to the Bilaspur Junction by Bengal Nagpur Railway.
