= Manikpur Junction railway station =

Railway station in Uttar Pradesh, India

Manikpur Junction Railway Station

General information
- Location: Manikpur, Uttar Pradesh; India
- Coordinates: 25°03′48″N 81°05′38″E
- Elevation: 250 metres (820 ft)
- System: Indian Railways station
- Owner: Indian Railways
- Operator: North Central Railway
- Lines: Prayagraj–Jabalpur section Jhansi–Manikpur line
- Platforms: 4
- Tracks: 4

Construction
- Structure type: Standard (on ground)
- Parking: Yes
- Cycle facilities: Yes

Other information
- Status: Functioning
- Station code: MKP
- Zone(s): North Central Railway
- Division(s): Prayagraj
Location
- Location within Uttar Pradesh

Manikpur Junction railway station is a railway station in Manikpur town of Chitrakoot district, Uttar Pradesh on Prayagraj–Jabalpur section. It is 99 km away from Prayagraj Junction. It has 4 platforms. Passenger and Superfast trains halt here.

== Major trains ==
- Yesvantpur–Lucknow Express (via Vijayawada)
- Bundelkhand Express
- Durg–Nautanwa Express (via Sultanpur)
- Durg–Nautanwa Express (via Varanasi)
- Saket Express
- Hubballi–Varanasi Weekly Express
- Yesvantpur–Lucknow Express (via Kacheguda)
- Udhna–Danapur Express
- Pune–Gorakhpur Express
- Surat–Bhagalpur Express
- Tapti Ganga Express
- Lokmanya Tilak Terminus–Darbhanga Pawan Express
- Kashi Express
- Tulsi Express
- Rewa–Anand Vihar Superfast Express
- Faizabad Superfast Express
- Chambal Express
- Howrah–Mathura Chambal Express
- Sarnath Express
- Shipra Express
- Rajendra Nagar–Lokmanya Tilak Terminus Janta Express
- Chitrakootdham (Karwi)–Kanpur Intercity Express (via Allahabad)
- Gaya–Chennai Egmore Weekly Superfast Express
- Kamayani Express
- Imperial Indian Mail
- Lokmanya Tilak Terminus–Varanasi Express
- Ahmedabad–Allahabad Weekly Superfast Express
- Lokmanya Tilak Terminus–Gorakhpur Express
- Uttar Pradesh Sampark Kranti Express
- Mahanagari Express
