= JLW =

JLW may refer to:

- Joe Louis Walker (1949–2025), American musician
- JLW, the Indian Railways station code for Jhalwara railway station, Madhya Pradesh, India

== See also ==
- JLW Building, former name of the Grenfell Centre in Adelaide, South Australia
