= Surat–Muzaffarpur Express =

Train in India

Surat-Muzaffarpur Express
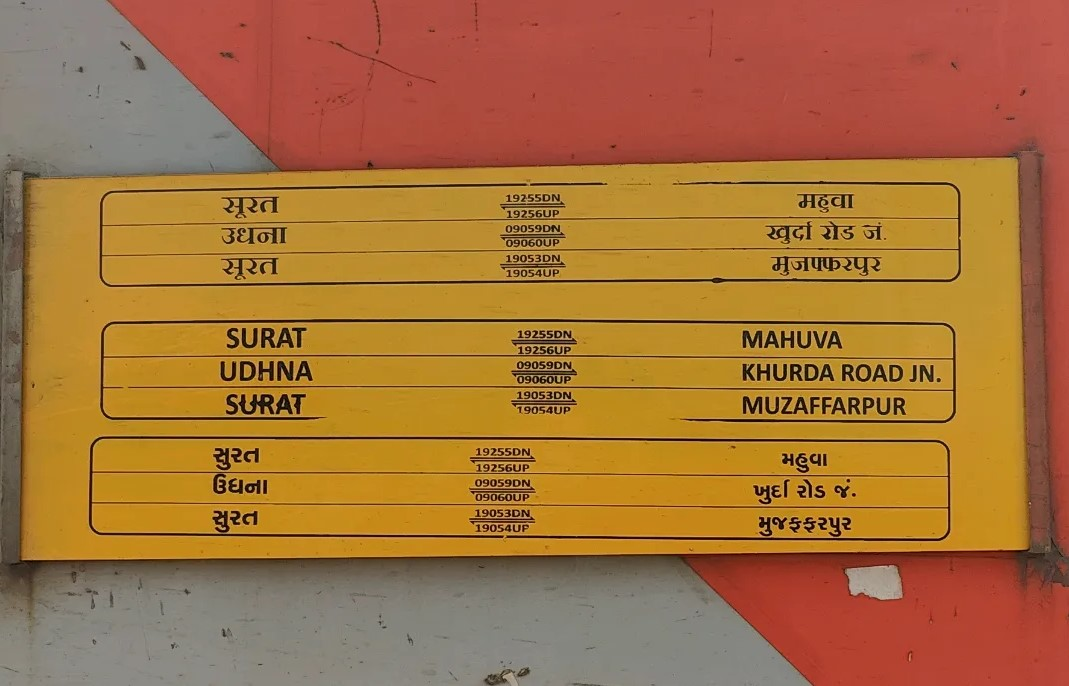

Overview
- Service type: Express
- Locale: Gujarat, Madhya Pradesh, Rajasthan, Uttar Pradesh & Bihar
- Current operator: Western Railway

Route
- Termini: Surat (ST); Muzaffarpur Junction (MFP)
- Stops: 25
- Distance travelled: 2,140 km (1,330 mi)
- Average journey time: 44 hrs 55 mins
- Service frequency: Weekly
- Train number: 19053 / 19054

On-board services
- Classes: AC 2 Tier, AC 3 Tier, Sleeper Class, General Unreserved
- Seating arrangements: Yes
- Sleeping arrangements: Yes
- Catering facilities: On-board Catering, E-Catering
- Observation facilities: Large windows
- Baggage facilities: Available

Technical
- Rolling stock: LHB coach
- Track gauge: Broad Gauge
- Operating speed: 48 km/h (30 mph) average including halts.

The 19053 / 19054 Muzaffarpur–Surat Express is a long-distance passenger train of Indian Railways that connects Muzaffarpur in the state of Bihar with Surat in Gujarat.

The train plays an important role in linking Tirhut Region of North Bihar with western India, especially for migrant workers, traders, and students.

== Schedule ==
19053 / 19054 Surat–Muzaffarpur Express Schedule
Train Type	Express
Distance	2137 km (19053) / 2137 km (19054)
Average Speed	~48 km/h
Journey Time (Surat → Muzaffarpur)	~44 hrs 55 min
Journey Time (Muzaffarpur → Surat)	~44 hrs 45 min
Classes Available	2A, 3A, SL, GN
Operating Days	Weekly
Operator	Western Railway

== Route and halts ==
19053 Surat–Muzaffarpur Express and 19054 Muzaffarpur–Surat Express Schedule
Sr.	19053 ST–MFP				19054 MFP–ST			
Sr.	Station	Day	Arr.	Dep.	Station	Day	Arr.	Dep.
1	Surat	1	—	07:35	Muzaffarpur Junction	1	—	20:10
2	Vadodara Junction	1	09:22	09:32	Hajipur Junction	1	21:00	21:05
3	Dahod	1	12:20	12:22	Sonpur Junction	1	21:13	21:15
4	Ratlam Junction	1	14:05	14:15	Chhapra Junction	1	22:40	22:50
5	Nagda Junction	1	15:03	15:05	Ballia	2	00:05	00:10
6	Ujjain Junction	1	16:05	16:15	Mau Junction	2	01:15	01:20
7	Maksi Junction	1	17:28	17:30	Azamgarh	2	02:10	02:15
8	Biyavra Rajgarh	1	19:03	19:05	Shahganj Junction	2	03:35	04:00
9	Guna	1	21:05	21:15	Ayodhya Dham Junction	2	05:31	05:33
10	Ashok Nagar	1	21:46	21:48	Ayodhya Cantt	2	06:00	06:05
11	Mungaoli	1	22:18	22:20	Lucknow Junction	2	09:35	09:45
12	Bina Junction	2	00:05	00:25	Kanpur Central	2	12:50	12:55
13	Virangana Lakshmibai Jhansi Junction	2	03:15	03:23	Tundla Junction	2	15:40	15:45
14	Gwalior Junction	2	04:40	04:42	Agra Cantt	2	16:30	16:35
15	Dhaulpur	2	05:55	05:57	Dhaulpur	2	17:23	17:25
16	Agra Cantt	2	06:35	06:40	Gwalior Junction	2	18:29	18:31
17	Tundla Junction	2	07:50	07:55	Virangana Lakshmibai Jhansi Junction	2	20:25	20:33
18	Kanpur Central	2	11:40	11:45	Bina Junction	2	23:35	23:55
19	Lucknow Junction	2	13:25	13:35	Mungaoli	3	00:25	00:27
20	Ayodhya Cantt	2	16:25	16:30	Ashok Nagar	3	00:58	01:00
21	Ayodhya Dham Junction	2	16:58	17:00	Guna	3	01:45	01:55
22	Shahganj Junction	2	20:20	20:25	Biyavra Rajgarh	3	03:18	03:20
23	Azamgarh	2	21:45	21:50	Maksi Junction	3	06:50	06:52
24	Mau Junction	2	22:35	22:40	Ujjain Junction	3	08:20	08:30
25	Ballia	2	23:40	23:45	Nagda Junction	3	09:35	09:37
26	Chhapra Junction	3	01:20	01:30	Ratlam Junction	3	10:20	10:30
27	Sonpur Junction	3	02:29	02:31	Dahod	3	11:52	11:54
28	Hajipur Junction	3	02:43	02:48	Vadodara Junction	3	14:20	14:30
29	Muzaffarpur Junction	3	04:30	—	Surat	3	16:55	—

== Coach composition ==
Category	Coaches	Total
Composite First AC + AC II Tier (HA1)	HA1	1
AC 2 Tier (2A)	A1, A2	2
AC 3 Tier (3A)	B1, B2, B3, B4, B5, B6	6
Sleeper Class (SL)	S1, S2, S3, S4, S5, S6, S7	7
General Unreserved (GEN)	GN, GN, GN, GN	4
Seating cum Luggage Rake (SLR)	SLR, SLR	2
Total Coaches		22

- Primary Maintenance - Surat Coaching Depot
- Secondary Maintenance - Muzaffarpur Coaching Depot

== Direction reversals ==
The train reverses its direction twice at;

- Bina Junction and
- Shahganj Junction.

== Rake sharing ==
The train shares its rake with 12945/12946 Surat - Mahuva Superfast Express.

== See also ==
- Surat - Chhapra Tapti Ganga Express
- Valsad - Muzaffarpur Shramik express
- Udhna - Varanasi Bholenagari Express
- Udhna - Jaynagar Antyodaya Express
- Ahmedabad - Saharsa Express
- Avadh Express
