= Shramik Express =

Train in India

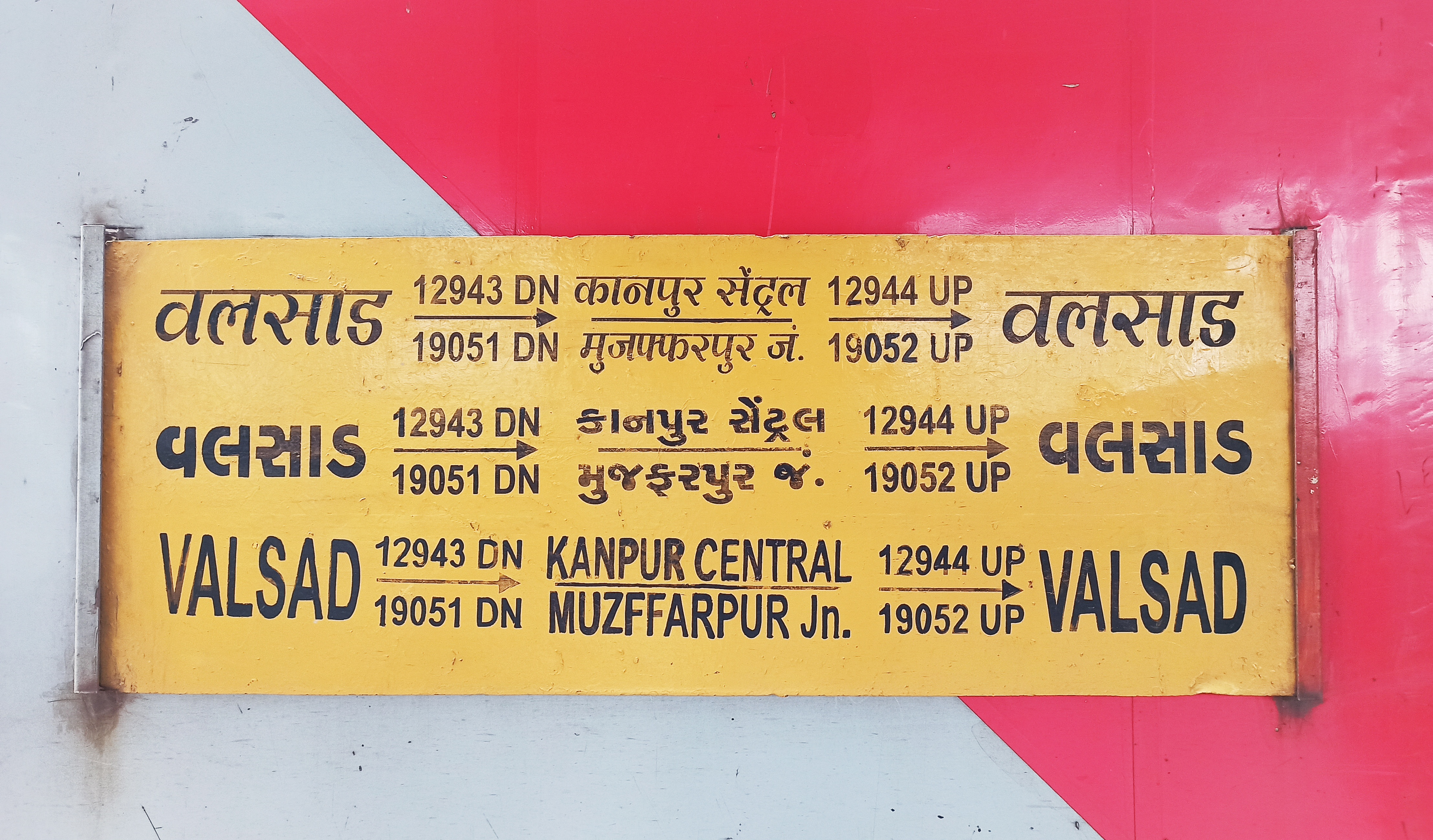
- Shramik Express trainboard.

Overview
- Service type: Express
- Locale: Gujarat, Maharashtra, Madhya Pradesh, Uttar Pradesh & Bihar
- Current operator: Western Railway

Route
- Termini: Valsad (BL); Muzaffarpur Junction (MFP)
- Stops: 19
- Distance travelled: 1,859 km (1,155 mi)
- Service frequency: Weekly
- Train number: 19051 / 19052

On-board services
- Classes: Ac 2 tier, AC 3 tier, Sleeper Class, General Unreserved
- Seating arrangements: Yes
- Sleeping arrangements: Yes
- Catering facilities: E-catering only
- Observation facilities: Large windows
- Baggage facilities: Available
- Other facilities: Below the seats

Technical
- Rolling stock: LHB coach
- Track gauge: 1,676 mm (5 ft 6 in); Broad Gauge
- Operating speed: 57 km/h (35 mph) average including halts.
- Rake sharing: Rake sharing with 12943/12944 Udyog Karmi Express
Route map
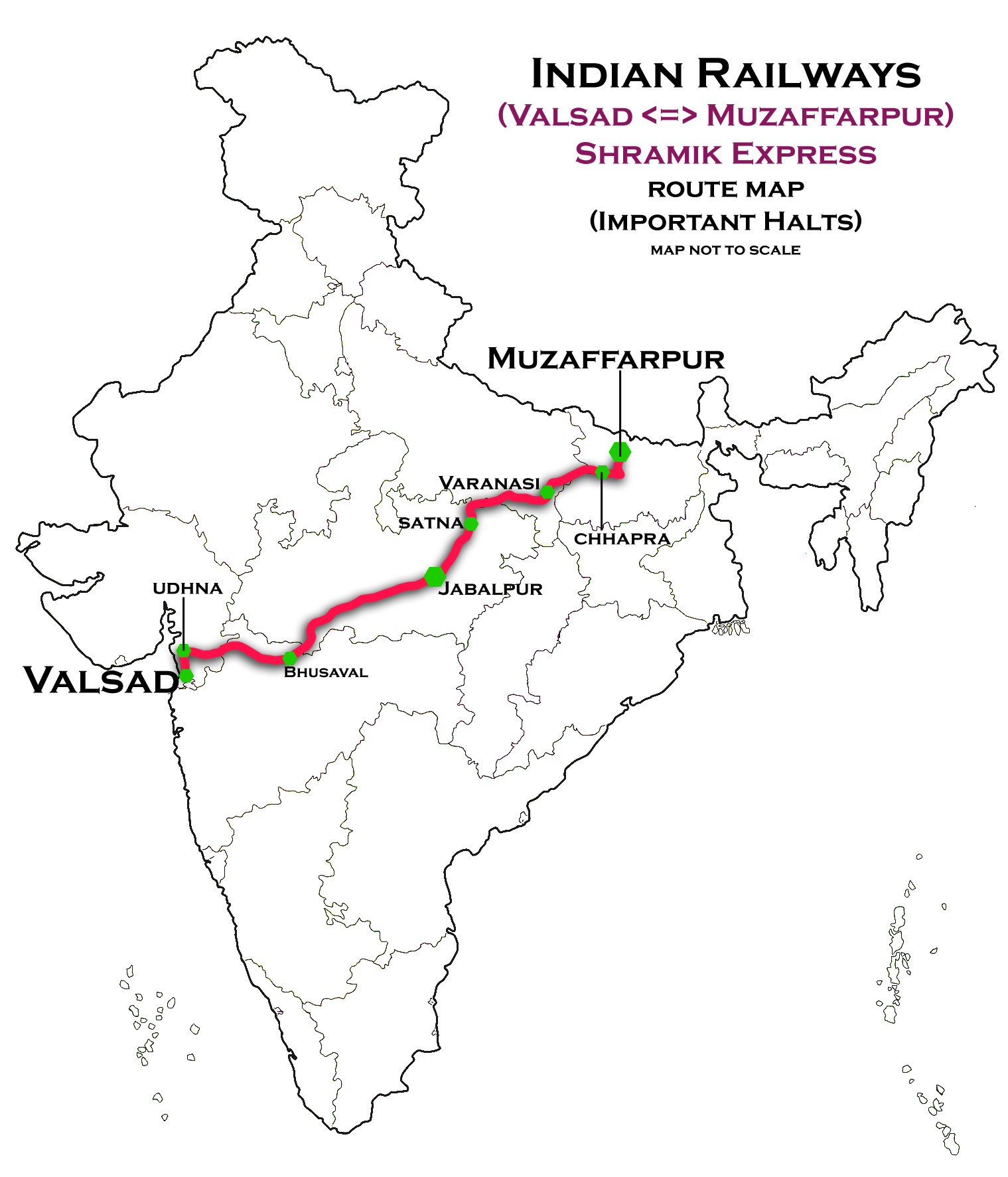

The Shramik Express (19051/19052) is an express train operated by Indian Railways that runs between Valsad in Gujarat and Muzaffarpur in Bihar, connecting western and northern India. It primarily serves migrant workers and long-distance passengers across several states.

== Schedule ==
19051 / 19052 Valsad–Muzaffarpur Shramik Express Schedule
Train Type	Express
Distance	1859 km (19051) / 1859 km (19052)
Average Speed	~44 km/h
Journey Time (Valsad → Muzaffarpur)	~32 hrs 50 min
Journey Time (Muzaffarpur → Valsad)	~34 hrs 55 min
Classes Available	2A, 3A, SL, GN
Operating Days	Weekly
Operator	Western Railway

== Coach composition ==
Category	Coaches	Total
AC 2 Tier (2A)	A1, A2	2
AC 3 Tier (3A)	B1, B2, B3, B4, B5	5
Sleeper Class (SL)	S1, S2, S3, S4, S5, S6, S7, S8	8
General Unreserved (GEN)	GN, GN, GN, GN	4
Seating cum Luggage Rake (SLR)	SLR	1
End-On Generator (EOG)	EOG	1
Total Coaches		21

- Primary Maintenance - Valsad Caching Depot

== Route & halts ==
19051 Valsad–Muzaffarpur Shramik Express and 19052 Muzaffarpur–Valsad Shramik Express Schedule
Sr.	19051 BL–MFP				19052 MFP–BL			
Sr.	Station	Day	Arr.	Dep.	Station	Day	Arr.	Dep.
1	Valsad	1	—	22:20	Muzaffarpur Junction	1	—	20:10
2	Bhestan	1	22:53	22:55	Hajipur Junction	1	21:00	21:05
3	Vyara	2	00:01	00:02	Sonpur Junction	1	21:13	21:15
4	Nandurbar	2	01:20	01:25	Chhapra Junction	1	22:40	22:50
5	Jalgaon Junction	2	03:42	03:45	Ballia	2	00:05	00:10
6	Bhusaval Junction	2	04:15	04:20	Ghazipur City	2	01:05	01:07
7	Itarsi Junction	2	09:25	09:35	Jaunpur Junction	2	03:20	03:25
8	Jabalpur	2	12:50	13:00	Varanasi Junction	2	04:55	05:05
9	Katni Junction	2	14:15	14:20	Prayagraj Chheoki Junction	2	08:18	08:20
10	Satna	2	15:45	15:50	Satna	2	11:10	11:15
11	Prayagraj Chheoki Junction	2	19:03	19:05	Katni Junction	2	12:40	12:45
12	Varanasi Junction	2	22:10	22:20	Jabalpur	2	14:20	14:30
13	Jaunpur Junction	2	23:40	23:45	Itarsi Junction	2	18:25	18:35
14	Ghazipur City	3	00:53	00:55	Bhusaval Junction	2	23:30	23:35
15	Ballia	3	01:55	02:00	Jalgaon Junction	3	00:12	00:15
16	Chhapra Junction	3	03:25	03:35	Nandurbar	3	02:40	02:45
17	Sonpur Junction	3	04:33	04:35	Vyara	3	03:59	04:00
18	Hajipur Junction	3	04:45	04:50	Bhestan	3	05:45	05:50
19	Muzaffarpur Junction	3	07:10	—	Valsad	3	07:05	—

== Traction ==
It is hauled by a Vadodara Loco Shed based WAP-7 electric locomotive from Valsad to Muzaffarpur and vice versa.

== Rake sharing ==
The train shares its rake with 12943/12944 Udyog Karmi Express.

== See also ==
- Tapti Ganga Express
- Udhna–Varanasi Express
- Surat–Muzaffarpur Express
- Surat–Bhagalpur Express
- Avadh Express
