= Katni Murwara Junction railway station =

Railway station in Madhya Pradesh

Katni Murwara
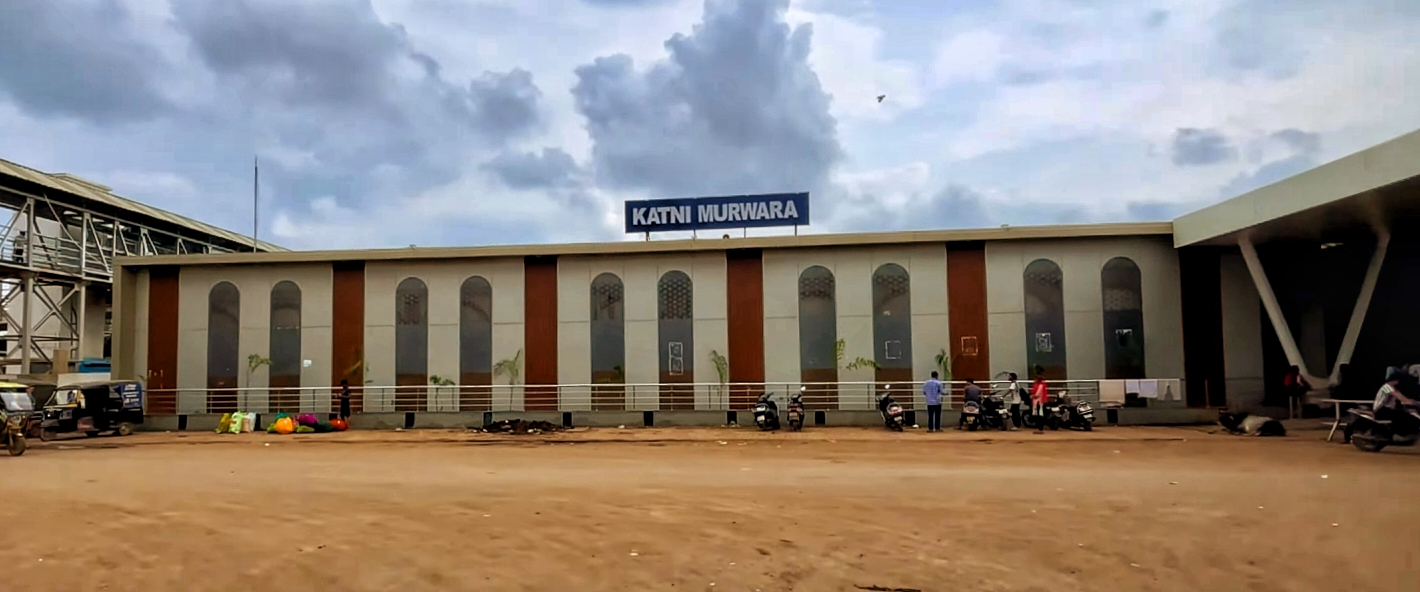
- Katni Murwara Junction

General information
- Location: Katni, Katni district, Madhya Pradesh; India
- Coordinates: 23°49′53″N 80°23′29″E
- Elevation: 381 metres (1,250 ft)
- System: Indian Railways station
- Owner: Indian Railways
- Operator: West Central Railway
- Line: Bina–Katni line
- Platforms: 5
- Tracks: 5

Construction
- Structure type: Standard (on ground)
- Parking: Yes

Other information
- Status: Functioning
- Station code: KMZ
- Zone(s): West Central Railway
- Division(s): Jabalpur
Location
- Location within India Location within Madhya Pradesh

Katni Murwara railway station (Station Code: KMZ) is a railway station in Katni and part of the West Central Railway under Jabalpur division.

== Lines ==
It is on the Bina–Katni rail route and connects to Prayagraj–Jabalpur section of Howrah–Prayagraj–Mumbai line, Katni–Bilaspur line and Katni–Billibari link.

== See also ==
- Katni Junction
- Katni South
- New Katni Junction
