= Katni South railway station =

Railway station in Madhya Pradesh

Katni South

General information
- Location: Katni, Katni district, Madhya Pradesh; India
- Coordinates: 23°49′00″N 80°24′03″E
- Elevation: 395 metres (1,296 ft)
- System: Indian Railways station
- Owner: Indian Railways
- Operator: West Central Railway
- Line: Prayagraj–Jabalpur section
- Platforms: 2
- Tracks: 4

Construction
- Structure type: Standard (on ground)
- Parking: Yes

Other information
- Status: Functioning
- Station code: KTES
- Zone(s): West Central Railway
- Division(s): Jabalpur
Location
- Location within India Location within Madhya Pradesh

Katni South railway station (station code: KTES) is a railway station in Katni and part of the West Central Railway. It is on the Prayagraj–Jabalpur section and connects to Katni–Bilaspur line and Katni–Billibari link.

== See also ==
- Katni Junction
- New Katni Junction
- Katni Murwara
