= New Katni Junction railway station =

Railway station in Madhya Pradesh

New Katni Junction

General information
- Location: Near Hump Gate, SKP Road, Katni, Madhya Pradesh; India
- Coordinates: 23°48′50″N 80°25′15″E
- Elevation: 390 metres (1,280 ft)
- System: Indian Railways junction station
- Owner: Indian Railways
- Operator: West Central Railways
- Lines: Katni–Billibari link, Katni–Bilaspur line
- Platforms: 2
- Tracks: 7

Construction
- Structure type: Standard (On Ground Station)

Other information
- Status: Functioning
- Station code: NKJ
- Zone(s): West Central Railway zone
- Division(s): Jabalpur
Location
- Location within Madhya Pradesh

New Katni Junction railway station (station code:- NKJ) railway station, located on the Katni–Bilaspur line, serves Katni in Madhya Pradesh.

A small colonial goods yard existed at KMZ during the early 1950s. The Railway Board in 1956 authorized construction of a Marshalling Yard in New Katni Junction, which opened on 19 January 1961.

== Electric Loco Shed, New Katni Jn. ==
| Serial No. | Locomotive Class | Horsepower | Quantity |
|---|---|---|---|
| 1. | WAG-9 | 6120 | 186 |
| 2. | EF9K | 9000 | 32 |
| 3. | EF12K | 12000 | 28 |
| Total Locomotives Active as of February 2026 | | | 246 |

== New township ==
A new township for accommodating more than 5,000 railway employees has been developed at New Katni.

| Preceding station | Indian Railways | Following station |
|---|---|---|
| Katni Junction towards ? | West Central Railway zone Katni–Billibari link | Katangi Khurd towards ? |
| Katni Murwara towards ? | West Central Railway zone Katni–Bilaspur line | Jhalwara towards ? |
| Katni South towards ? | West Central Railway zone Katni–Bilaspur line | Jhalwara towards ? |
