= Valsad–Haridwar Superfast Express =

Train in India

Overview
- Service type: Superfast Express
- First service: 28 December 2010; 15 years ago
- Current operator: Western Railway

Route
- Termini: Valsad (BL); Haridwar (HW)
- Stops: 15
- Distance travelled: 1,435 km (892 mi)
- Average journey time: 23 hrs 25 mins
- Service frequency: Weekly
- Train number: 12911 / 12912

On-board services
- Classes: AC 2 tier, AC 3 tier, Sleeper class, General Unreserved
- Seating arrangements: Yes
- Sleeping arrangements: Yes
- Catering facilities: On-board catering, E-catering
- Observation facilities: Large windows
- Baggage facilities: Available
- Other facilities: Below the seats

Technical
- Rolling stock: LHB coach
- Track gauge: 1,676 mm (5 ft 6 in)
- Operating speed: 130 km/h (81 mph) maximum, 61 km/h (38 mph) average including halts.

The 12911 / 12912 Valsad–Haridwar Superfast Express is a Superfast Express train belonging to Indian Railways – Western Railway zone that runs between Valsad and Haridwar Junction in India.

It operates as train number 12911 from Valsad to Haridwar Junction and as train number 12912 in the reverse direction, serving the states of Gujarat, Madhya Pradesh, Rajasthan, Uttar Pradesh, Delhi and Uttarakhand.

== Coaches ==
The 12911 / 12 Valsad–Haridwar Superfast Express has 2 AC 2 tier, 6 AC 3 tier, 8 Sleeper class, 4 General Unreserved and 1 EOG (Seating cum luggage rake) and 1 SLR coaches. It does not carry a pantry car.

As is customary with most train services in India, coach composition may be amended at the discretion of Indian Railways depending on demand.

== Service ==
12911 Valsad–Haridwar Superfast Express covers the distance of 1433 kilometres in 23 hours 20 mins (58.69 km/h) and in 20 hours 55 mins as 12912 Haridwar–Valsad Superfast Express. (61.20 km/h).

As the average speed of the train is above 55 km/h (34 mph), as per Indian Railways rules, its fare includes a Superfast surcharge.

== Route & halts ==
The train runs from Valsad via Navsari, Surat, Ankleshwar Junction, Vadodara Junction, Godhra Junction, Dahod, Ratlam Junction, Kota Junction, Sawai Madhopur Junction, Bharatpur Junction, Hazrat Nizamuddin, Ghaziabad Junction, Meerut City, Roorkee to Haridwar.

== Traction ==
The entire route is fully electrified. It is hauled by a Valsad Loco Shed-based WAP-7 electric locomotive on its entire journey.

== Schedule ==
Train number	Station code	Departure station	Departure time	Departure day	Arrival station	Arrival time	Arrival day
12911	BL	Valsad	15:10 PM	Tuesday	Haridwar	14:30 PM	Wednesday
12912	HW	Haridwar	17:20 PM	Wednesday	Valsad	14:20 PM	Thursday

== Rake sharing ==
The train shares its rake with 20933/20934 Udhna–Danapur Express with Primary Maintenance (PM) at Valsad CDO.
