= Jaynagar–Udhna Antyodaya Express =

Train in India

Jaynagar – Udhna Antyodaya Express

Overview
- Service type: Antyodaya Express
- First service: 8 October 2017; 7 years ago
- Current operator(s): East Central Railways

Route
- Termini: Jaynagar (JYG); Udhna Junction (UDN)
- Stops: 21
- Distance travelled: 1,862 km (1,157 mi)
- Average journey time: 36h 15m
- Service frequency: Weekly (Note: Run once in a week for every direction.)
- Train number(s): 15563 / 15564

On-board services
- Class(es): Unreserved
- Seating arrangements: Yes
- Sleeping arrangements: No
- Catering facilities: No
- Baggage facilities: Available

Technical
- Rolling stock: LHB-Antyodaya
- Track gauge: 1,676 mm (5 ft 6 in)
- Operating speed: 51 km/h (32 mph) average including halts
Route map
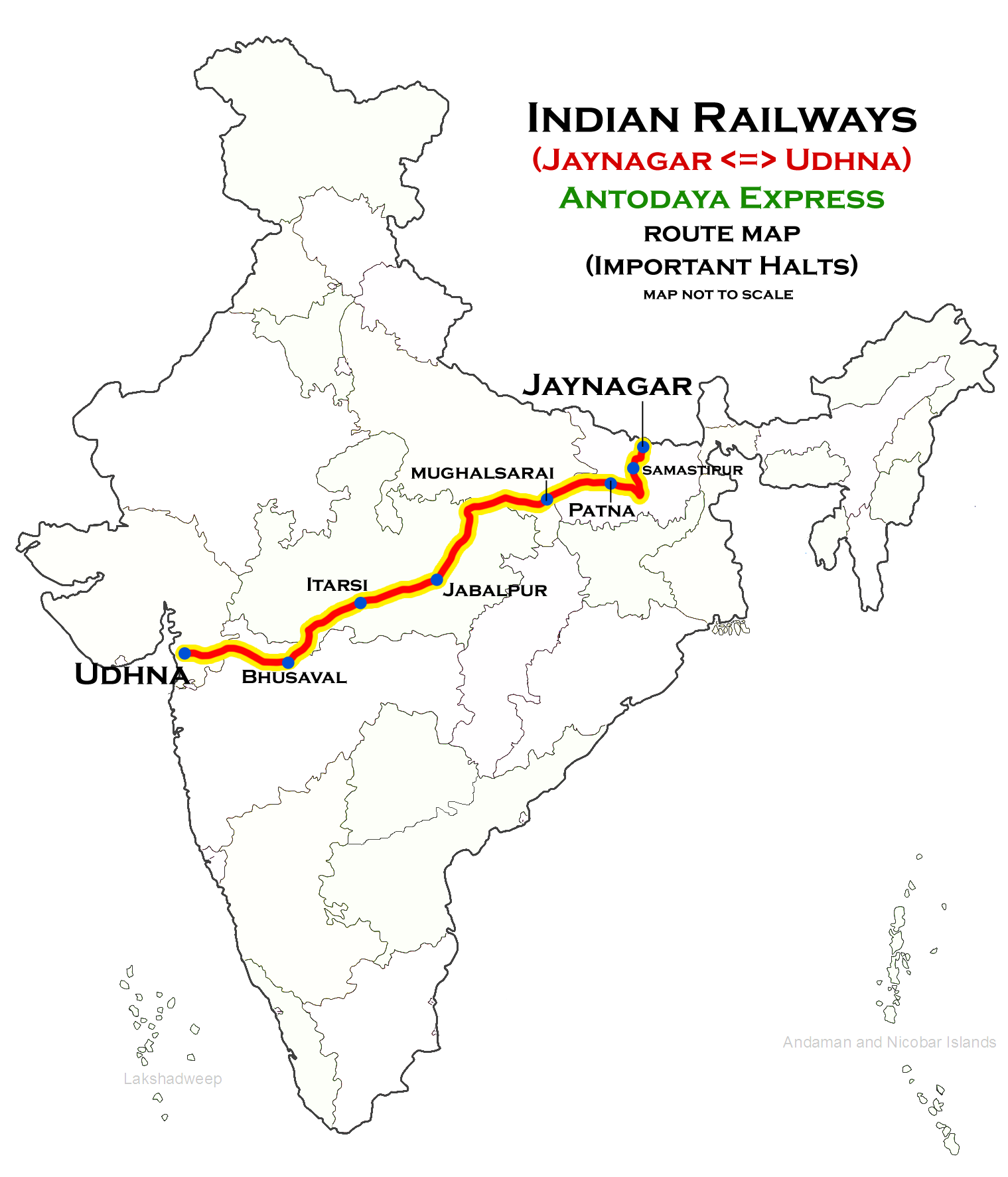

Jaynagar–Udhna Antyodaya Express is an Express train belonging to East Central Railway zone that runs between Jaynagar and Udhna Junction. It is currently being operated with 15563/15564 train numbers on a weekly basis.

== Traction ==
Jaynagar to Udhna WAP-7 of Gomoh electric loco shed.

== Service ==
The 15563/Jaynagar–Udhna Antyodaya Express has an average speed of 51 km/h and covers 1862 km in 36h 15m. The 15564/Udhna–Jaynagar Antyodaya Express has an average speed of 49 km/h and covers 1862 km in 37h 50m.

== Coach composition ==
The trains is completely general coaches trains designed by Indian Railways with features of LED screen display to show information about stations, train speed etc. Vending machines for water. Bio toilets in compartments as well as CCTV cameras and mobile charging points and toilet occupancy indicators.

== Route & halts ==
- Jaynagar
- Darbhanga Junction
- Samastipur Junction
- Barauni Junction
- Mokama
- Patna Junction
- Ara Junction
- Buxar
- Mughalsarai Junction
- Mirzapur
- Allahabad Chheoki Junction
- Satna Junction
- Katni Junction
- Jabalpur Junction
- Narsinghpur
- Pipariya
- Itarsi Junction
- Harda
- Khandwa Junction
- Bhusaval Junction
- Jalgaon Junction
- Nandurbar
- Udhna Junction

== See also ==
- Antyodaya Express
- Jaynagar railway station
- Udhna Junction railway station
- Bandra Terminus–Gorakhpur Antyodaya Express
