= Mungaoli railway station =

Railway station in Madhya Pradesh, India

Mungaoli

General information
- Location: Mungaoli, Ashoknagar district, Madhya Pradesh; India
- Coordinates: 24°24′09″N 78°06′44″E
- System: Indian Railways station
- Owner: Indian Railways
- Operator: West Central Railway
- Line: Kota–Bina line
- Platforms: 2
- Tracks: 2

Construction
- Structure type: Standard (on ground)
- Parking: Yes

Other information
- Status: Functioning
- Station code: MNV
- Zone(s): West Central Railway
- Division(s): Bhopal
Location
- Location within India Location within Madhya Pradesh

Mungaoli railway station is a railway station in Ashoknagar district, Madhya Pradesh. Its code is MNV. It serves Mungaoli town. The station consists of two platforms. It lacks many facilities including water and sanitation. Passenger and Express trains halt here.
