= Salaiya =

Coordinates: 23.775°N 80.712°E

Salaiya is a town in Sidhi district, Madhya Pradesh, India.
