= Mahanagari Express =

Train in India

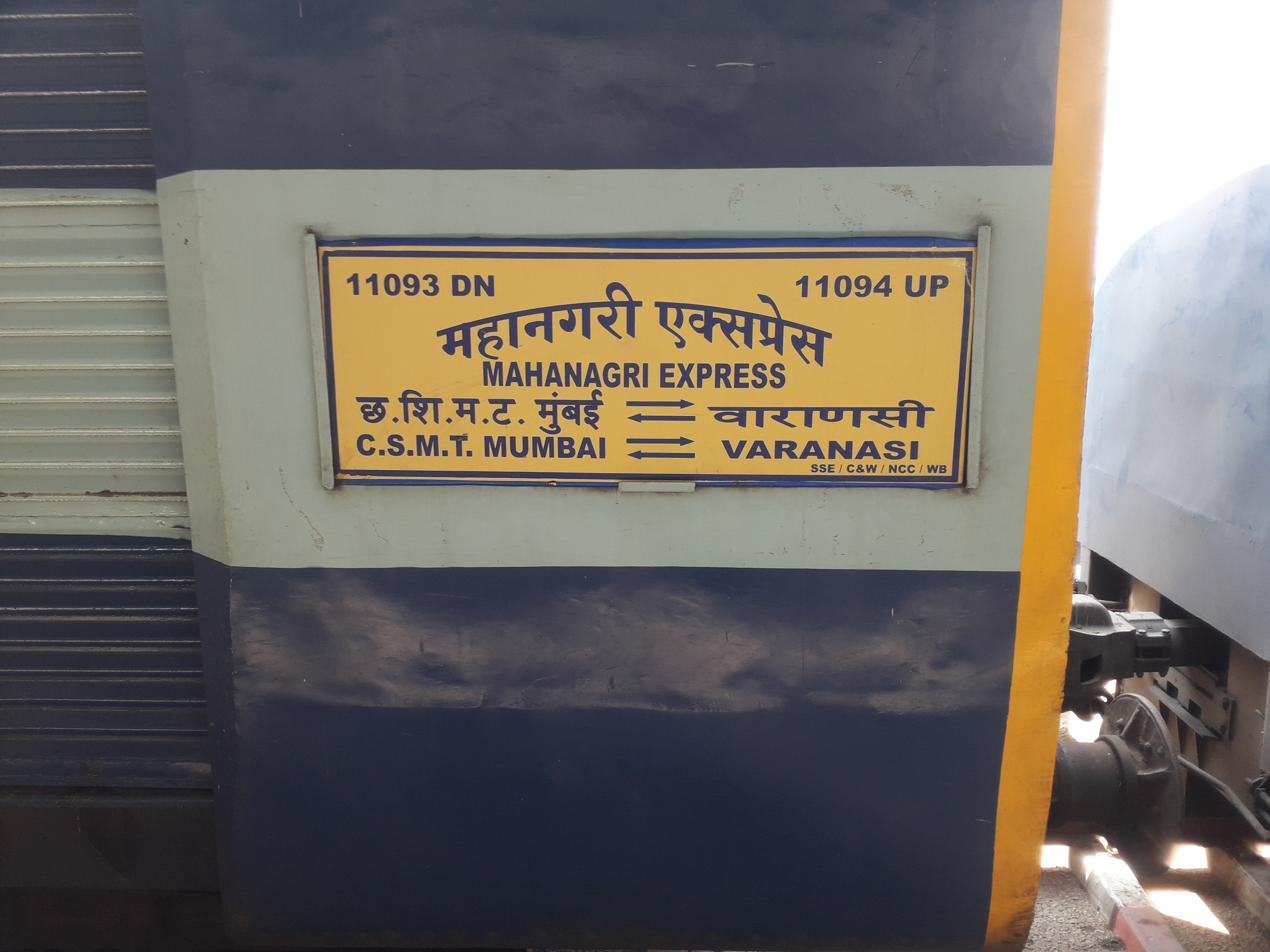

Overview
- Service type: Express
- Locale: Maharashtra, Madhya Pradesh, Uttar Pradesh
- First service: January 1, 1981; 44 years ago
- Current operator(s): Central Railways

Route
- Termini: Chhatrapati Shivaji Maharaj Terminus (CSTM); Varanasi Junction (BSB)
- Stops: 27 as 22177 Mahanagari Express, 26 as 22178 Mahanagari Express
- Distance travelled: 1,509 km (938 mi)
- Average journey time: 27 hours 25 minutes as 22177 Mahanagari Express, 25 hours 40 minutes as 22178 Mahanagari Express
- Service frequency: Daily
- Train number(s): 22177 / 22178

On-board services
- Class(es): AC 1 tier, AC 2 tier, AC 3 tier, Sleeper class, General Unreserved
- Seating arrangements: Yes
- Sleeping arrangements: Yes
- Catering facilities: Pantry car not available
- Observation facilities: Large windows
- Baggage facilities: Below the seats

Technical
- Rolling stock: Standard Indian Railways coaches
- Track gauge: 1,676 mm (5 ft 6 in)
- Operating speed: 130 km/h (81 mph) maximum, 55.33 km/h (34 mph) (including halts)

The Mahanagari Express is an express train, belonging to Indian Railways, that runs between Mumbai CSMT and Varanasi Junction in India. It operates as train number 22177 from Mumbai CSMT to Varanasi Junction and as train number 22178 in the reverse direction. Mahanagri Express is converted ICF coaches into LHB coaches in year 2023.
