= Prayagraj Chheoki Junction railway station =

Railway station in Prayagraj district, Uttar Pradesh, India

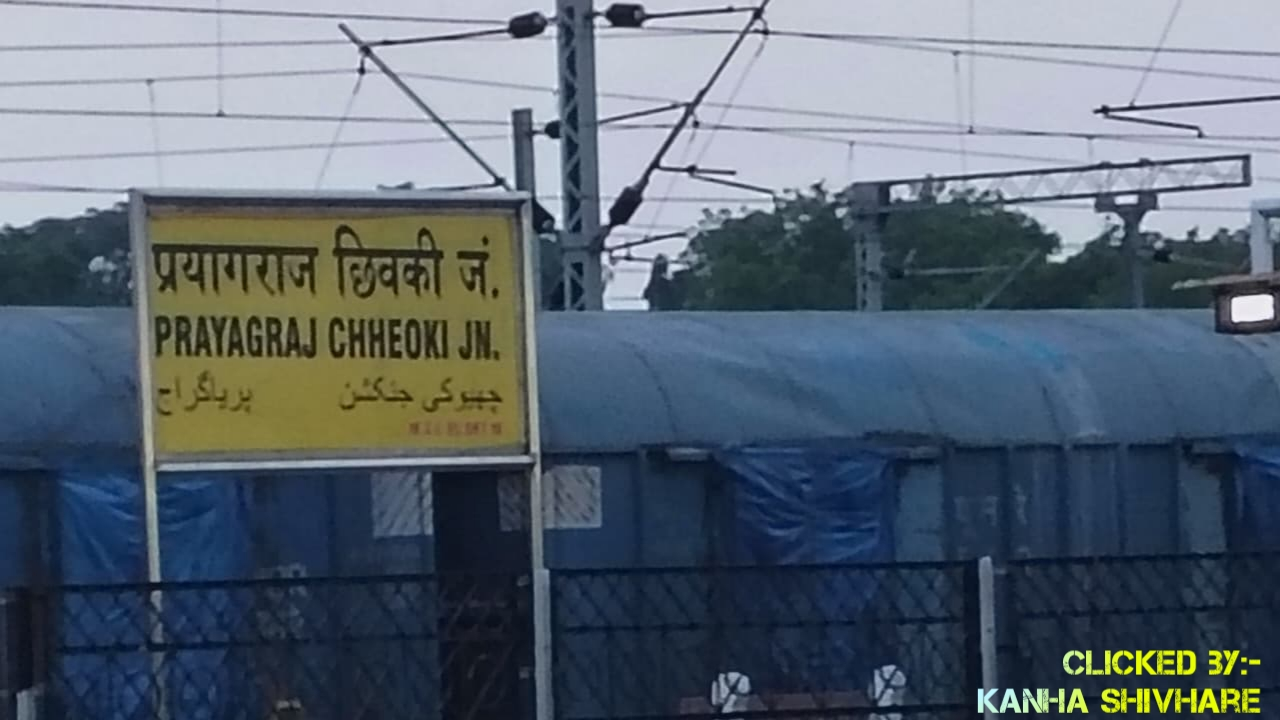
- Prayagraj Chheoki Junction

General information
- Other names: Allahabad Chheoki railway station
- Location: Naini, Prayagraj, Uttar Pradesh; India
- Coordinates: 25.3767°N 81.8672°E
- Elevation: 97 metres (318 ft)
- System: Indian Railways station
- Owner: Indian Railways
- Operator: North Central Railway zone
- Lines: New Delhi–Howrah main line, New Delhi–Gaya–Howrah line, Prayagraj–Jabalpur section, Howrah–Prayagraj–Mumbai line
- Platforms: 4
- Tracks: 11

Construction
- Structure type: Standard (on ground station)
- Parking: No
- Cycle facilities: No

Other information
- Status: Active
- Station code: PCOI, formerly ACOI
- Zone(s): North Central Railway zone
- Division(s): Prayagraj
Location
- Location within Uttar Pradesh Location within India

Prayagraj Chheoki Junction railway station, formerly and colloquially knows as Allahabad Chheoki railway station (station code: PCOI), is one of the major railways stations (besides Prayagraj Junction railway station) located in Prayagraj district. Chheoki is at a distance of 10 km from Prayagraj Junction on the Howrah–Delhi main line. Trains that bypass Prayagraj Junction and which come from Jabalpur and go towards Mughalsarai usually stop at Chheoki. To reduce the load on the main junction, trains were shifted to Chheoki. Chheoki has three platforms that are high-level platforms and one UTS.

== History ==
The station was constructed to decongest Prayagraj Junction and provide a separate route for trains to southern India and Jabalpur which originate from eastern India and Mughalsarai. A delay of more than 30 minutes for an engine change at Prayagraj is thus avoided. This allows trains on the New Delhi–Howrah route to run punctually since scarce platform space at Prayagraj Junction is freed up.

== Amenities ==
The station is a B-class station and part of North Central Railways under the Prayagraj railway division.

Some popular trains that stop at Chheoki are Bhagmati Express, Khwaja Garib Nawaz Madar–Kolkata Express, Bhagalpur–Ajmer Express, Chambal Express, Mahanagari Express, Shipra Express, Sanghamithra Express Tapti Ganga Express, Howrah–Mumbai Mail and Pune–Danapur Superfast Express, Bhagalpur Antyodaya Express, Humsafar Express, and Mahamana Express. Trains plying between Manikpur–Jabalpur–Itarsi, Manikpur–Jhansi–Gwalior, Manikpur–Katni–Bhopal–Indore and Manikpur–Nagpur–Gondia–Secunderabad–Yesvantpur transit through Cheoki.

The station currently lacks facilities like porters, however efforts are being made to convert the station to a satellite hub with better passenger amenities since several trains to southern India transit through this station.
