= Udyog Karmi Express =

Train in India

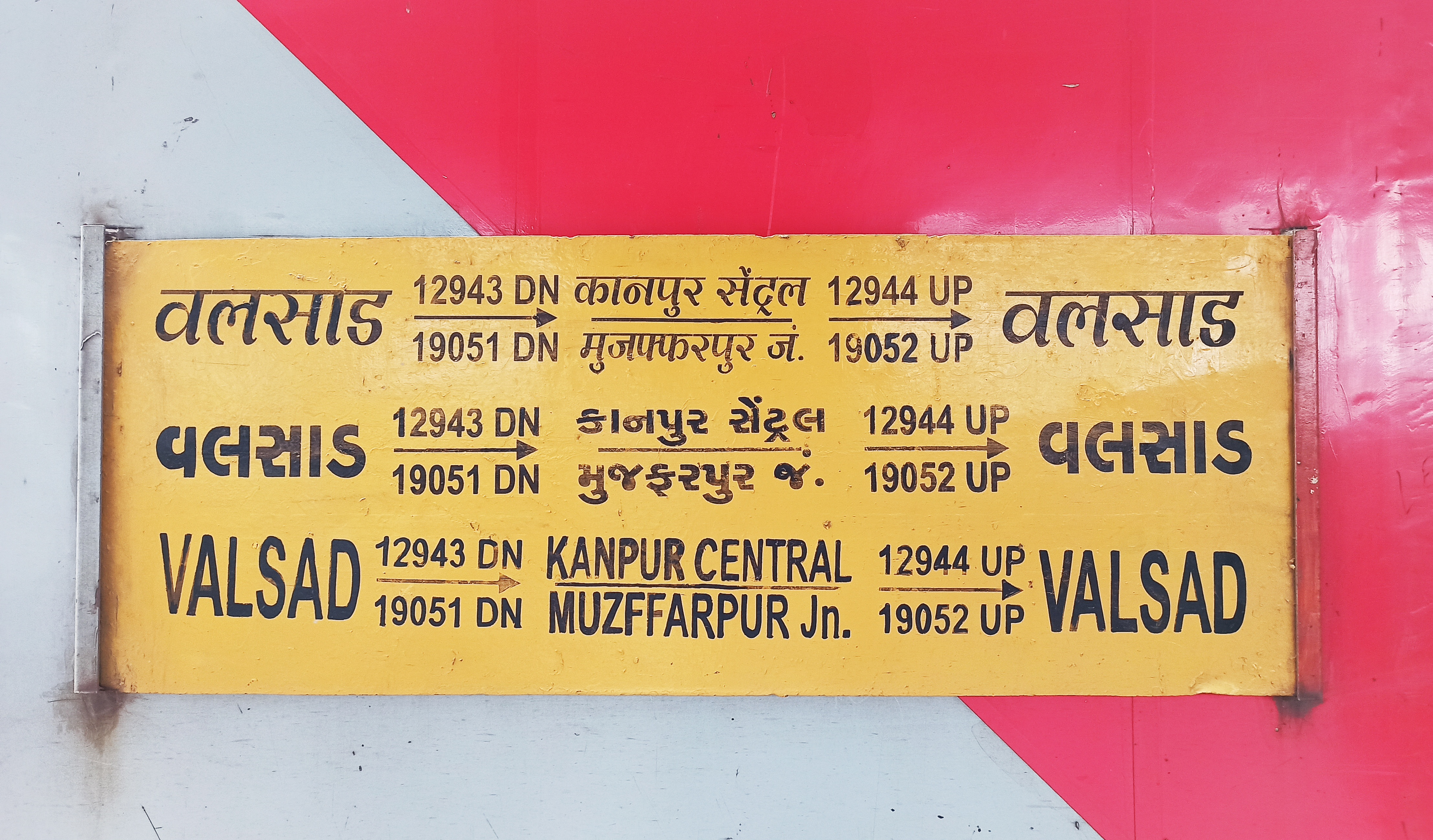
- Udyog Karmi Express train board.

Overview
- Service type: Superfast Express
- First service: 23 February 2007; 18 years ago
- Current operator: Western Railway

Route
- Termini: Valsad (BL); Kanpur Central (CNB)
- Stops: 10
- Distance travelled: 1,304 km (810 mi)
- Average journey time: 20 hours 10 minutes
- Service frequency: Weekly
- Train number: 12943 / 12944

On-board services
- Classes: AC 2 tier, AC 3 tier, Sleeper Class, General Unreserved
- Seating arrangements: Yes
- Sleeping arrangements: Yes
- Catering facilities: On-board catering, E-catering
- Observation facilities: Large windows
- Baggage facilities: Available
- Other facilities: Below the seats

Technical
- Rolling stock: LHB coach
- Track gauge: 1,676 mm (5 ft 6 in)
- Operating speed: 130 km/h (81 mph) maximum, 65 km/h (40 mph) average including halts.
- Rake sharing: Rake sharing with 19051/19052 Shramik Express

The 12943 / 12944 Udyog Karmi Express is a Superfast Express express train of the Indian Railways in the Western Railway zone that runs between Valsad and Kanpur in India.

It operates as train number 12943 from Valsad to Kanpur Central and as train number 12944 in the reverse direction serving the states of Gujarat, Maharashtra, Madhya Pradesh and Uttar Pradesh.

The train has been named 'Udyog Karmi' which translates to Industrial Worker in Devanagari as the train connects the two important industrial cities of Valsad & Kanpur in their respective states of Gujarat & Uttar Pradesh.

== Coaches ==
The 12943 / 12944 Valsad–Kanpur Central Udyog Karmi Express presently has 2 AC 2 tier 6 AC 3 tier, 8 Sleeper Class, 4 Unreserved/General, 1 End on Generator and 1 Seating cum Luggage Rake coaches. It does not carry a pantry car.

As is customary with most train services in India, coach composition may be amended at the discretion of Indian Railways depending on demand.

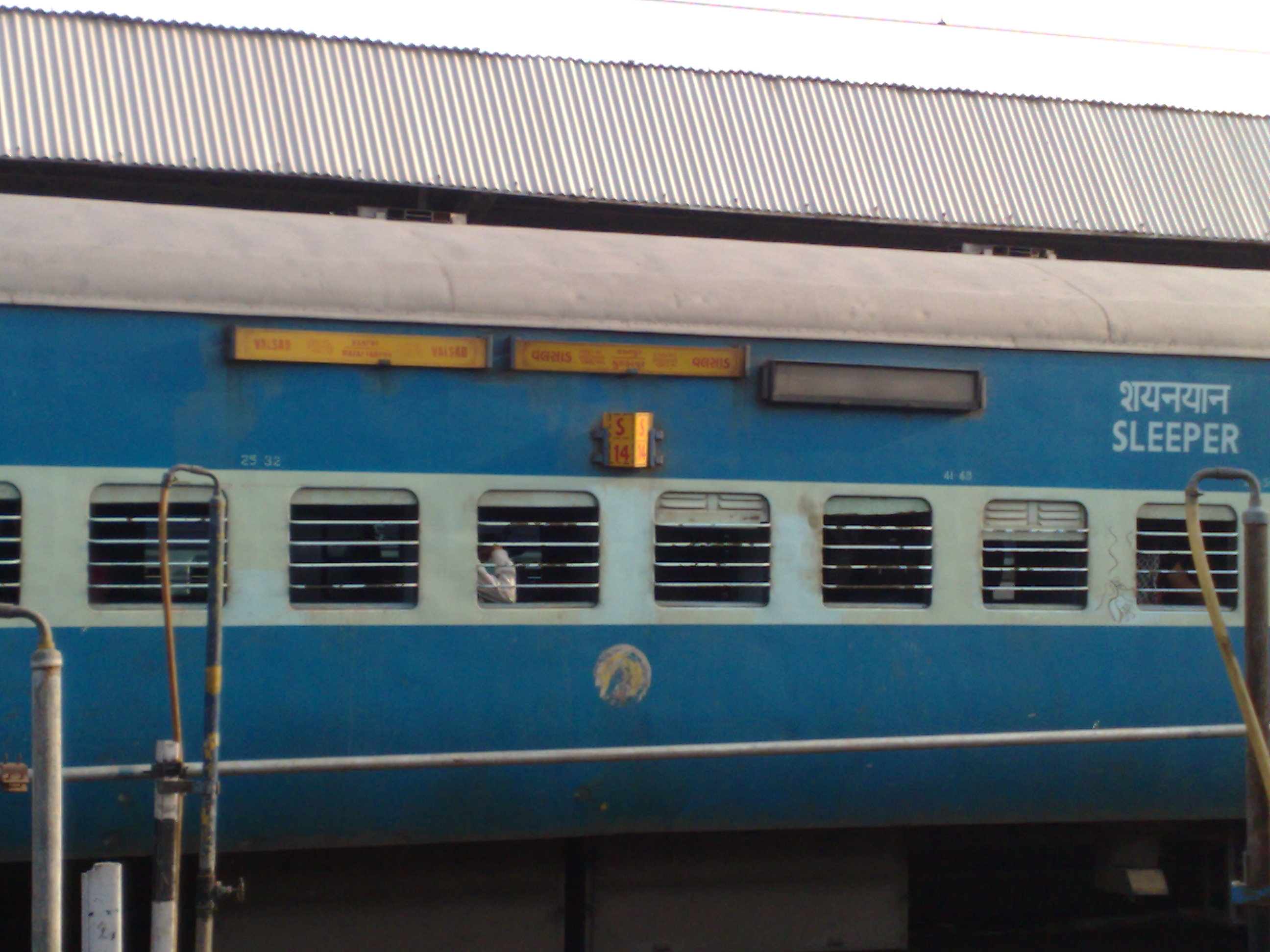
Udyog Karmi Express – Sleeper Class coach

== Service ==
12943 Valsad–Kanpur Central Udyog Karmi Express covers the distance of 1,305 km in 20 hours 10 mins (65 km/h) and in 21 hours 40 mins as 12944 Kanpur Central–Valsad Udyog Karmi Express (60 km/h).

As the average speed of the train is above 55 km/h (34 mph), as per Indian Railways rules, its fare includes a Superfast surcharge.

== Route & halts ==
The 12943 / 12944 Valsad–Kanpur Central Udyog Karmi Express runs from Valsad via Bhestan, Nandurbar, Jalgaon, Bhusaval, Khandwa, Itarsi Junction, Bhopal Junction, Bina, Jhansi Junction, Orai to Kanpur Central.

== Traction ==
As the route is fully electrified, a Vadodara Loco Shed-based WAP-7 electric locomotive hauls the train for its entire journey.

== Schedule ==
Train Number	Station Code	Departure Station	Departure Time	Departure Day	Arrival Station	Arrival Time	Arrival Day
12943	BL	Valsad	22:15 PM	Wednesday	Kanpur Central	18:25 PM	Thursday
12944	CNB	Kanpur Central	08:00 AM	Friday	Valsad	05:40 AM	Saturday

== Rake sharing ==
The train shares its rake with 19051/19052 Shramik Express.
