= Tapti Ganga Express =

Train in India

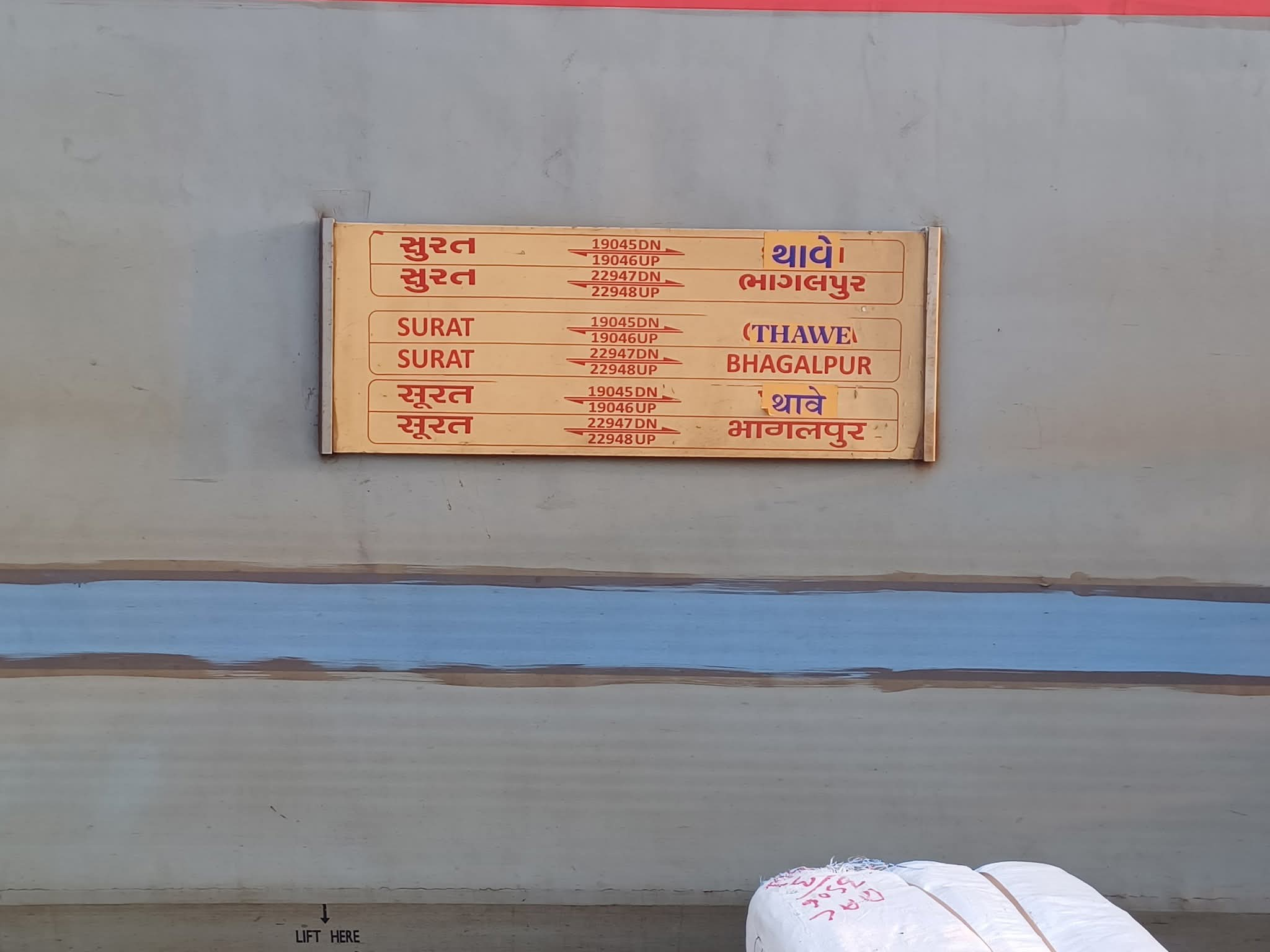
- Tapti Ganga Express train board.

Overview
- Service type: Express
- Locale: Gujarat, Maharashtra, Madhya Pradesh, Uttar Pradesh & Bihar
- Current operator: Western Railway

Route
- Termini: Surat (ST); Thawe (THE)
- Stops: 36
- Distance travelled: 1,831 km (1,138 mi)
- Average journey time: 34 hrs 15 mins
- Service frequency: 5 days a week
- Train number: 19045 / 19046

On-board services
- Classes: AC 3 Tier, Sleeper Class, General Unreserved
- Seating arrangements: Yes
- Sleeping arrangements: Yes
- Catering facilities: Available
- Observation facilities: Large windows
- Baggage facilities: Available
- Other facilities: Below the seats

Technical
- Rolling stock: LHB coach
- Track gauge: 1,676 mm (5 ft 6 in); Broad Gauge
- Operating speed: 53 km/h (33 mph) average including halts.

The 19045 / 19046 Tapti Ganga Express is an express train running between Surat in Gujarat and Thawe Junction in Bihar. The train is named after the Tapti River and the Ganga River in India.

It was introduced in 1990 by George Fernandes to run between Surat and Varanasi Junction. In the Railway Budget of 2012–13, it was extended up to Chhapra Junction, and again on September 30, 2025, it was further extended to Thawe Junction.

== Coach composition ==
Coach Composition of Tapti Ganga Express
Coach Type	Number of Coaches
AC III Tier	7
Sleeper Class	6
AC II Tier	2
Pantry Car	1
General Unreserved	4
EOG cum Luggage Rake	1
SLR	1

== Services ==
19045 Surat–Chhapra Tapti Ganga Express covers the distance of 1728 km in 32 hours 45 mins (53 km/h) and in 33 hours 40 mins as 19046 Chhapra–Surat Tapti Ganga Express (51 km/h).

As the average speed of the train is below 55 km/h (35 mph), as per Indian Railway rules, its fare doesn't include a Superfast surcharge.

== Route ==
Tapti Ganga Express – 19045 Route and Halts (Surat to Thawe)
Sr. No.	Station Name	Station Code
1	Surat	ST
2	Udhna Junction	UDN
3	Vyara	VYA
4	Navapur	NWU
5	Nandurbar	NDB
6	Dondaicha	DDE
7	Sindkheda	SNK
8	Amalner	AN
9	Jalgaon Junction	JL
10	Bhusaval Junction	BSL
11	Raver	RV
12	Burhanpur	BAU
13	Khandwa Junction	KNW
14	Harda	HD
15	Itarsi Junction	ET
16	Pipariya	PPI
17	Jabalpur	JBP
18	Katni	KTE
19	Maihar	MYR
20	Satna	STA
21	Manikpur Junction	MKP
22	Shankargarh	SRJ
23	Prayagraj Chheoki	PCOI
24	Vindhyachal	BDL
25	Mirzapur	MZP
26	Chunar	CAR
27	Kashi	KEI
28	Varanasi Junction	BSB
29	Jaunpur Junction	JNU
30	Shahganj Junction	SHG
31	Azamgarh	AMH
32	Muhammadabad	MMA
33	Mau Junction	MAU
34	Rasra	RSR
35	Ballia	BUI
36	Suraimanpur	SIP
37	Chhapra	CPR
38	Masrakh	MHC
39	Gopalganj	GOPG
40	Thawe Junction	THE

Tapti Ganga Express – 19046 Route and Halts (Thawe to Surat)
Sr. No.	Station Name	Station Code
1	Thawe Junction	THE
2	Gopalganj	GOPG
3	Masrakh	MHC
4	Chhapra	CPR
5	Suraimanpur	SIP
6	Ballia	BUI
7	Rasra	RSR
8	Mau Junction	MAU
9	Muhammadabad	MMA
10	Azamgarh	AMH
11	Shahganj Junction	SHG
12	Jaunpur Junction	JNU
13	Varanasi Junction	BSB
14	Kashi	KEI
15	Chunar	CAR
16	Mirzapur	MZP
17	Vindhyachal	BDL
18	Prayagraj Chheoki	PCOI
19	Shankargarh	SRJ
20	Manikpur Junction	MKP
21	Satna	STA
22	Maihar	MYR
23	Katni	KTE
24	Jabalpur	JBP
25	Pipariya	PPI
26	Itarsi Junction	ET
27	Harda	HD
28	Khandwa Junction	KNW
29	Burhanpur	BAU
30	Raver	RV
31	Bhusaval Junction	BSL
32	Jalgaon Junction	JL
33	Amalner	AN
34	Sindkheda	SNK
35	Dondaicha	DDE
36	Nandurbar	NDB
37	Navapur	NWU
38	Vyara	VYA
39	Udhna Junction	UDN
40	Surat	ST

== Rake sharing ==
The train shares its rake with 22947/22948 Surat–Bhagalpur Express.

== Traction ==
Both trains are hauled by a Vadodara Loco Shed or Valsad Loco Shed-based WAP-7 electric locomotive on its entire journey.

== See also ==
- Surat–Muzaffarpur Express
- Shramik Express
- Udhna–Varanasi Express
- Udhna–Danapur Express
- Jaynagar–Udhna Antyodaya Express
