= Prayagraj–Jabalpur section =

Railway route in India

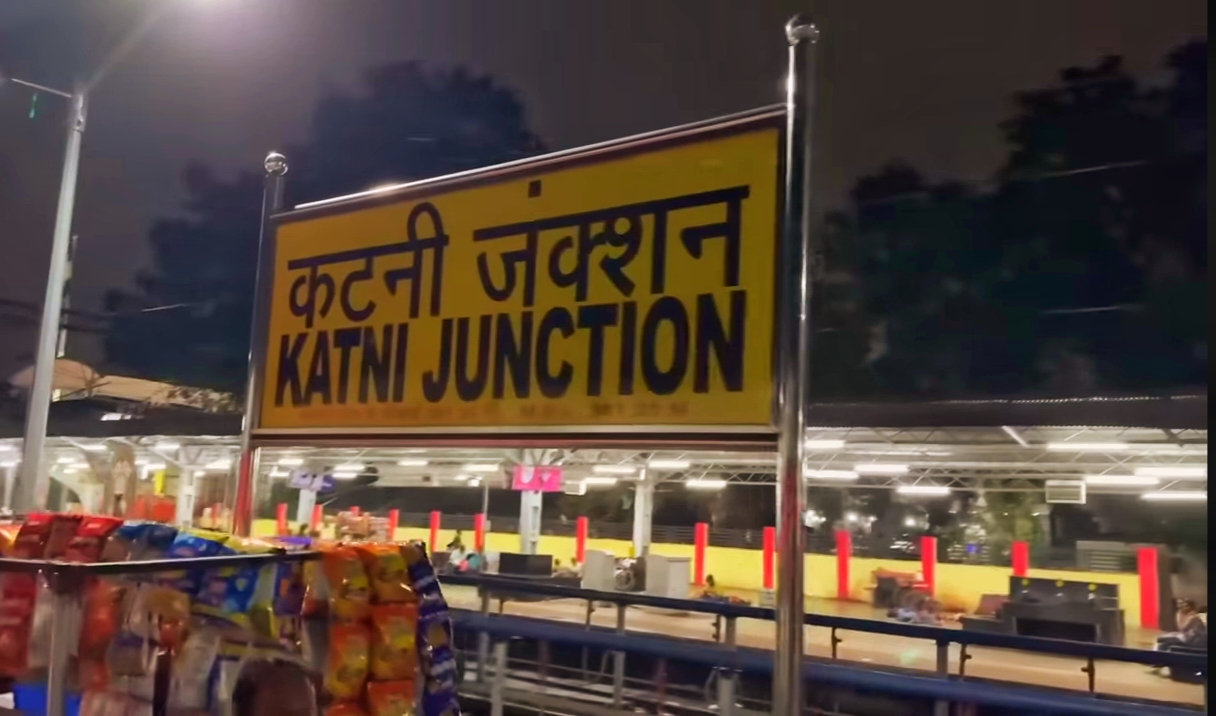
- Katni Junction railway station is an important Railway Station on Prayagraj–Jabalpur section

Overview
- Status: Operational
- Owner: Indian Railways
- Termini: Prayagraj; Jabalpur

Service
- Operator(s): North Central Railway; West Central Railway
- Depot: New Katni
- Rolling stock: WDM-2, WDM-3A, WDG-3A, WDG-3C, WAG-5 and WAG-7

History
- Opened: 1867

Technical
- Track length: Main line: 366 km (227 mi); Branch lines: Manikpur–Jhansi 390 km (242 mi); Khairar–Bhimsen119 km (74 mi); Mahoba–Khajuraho63 km (39 mi); Satna–Rewa49 km (30 mi); Katni–Billibari 319 km (198 mi)
- Track gauge: 5 ft 6 in (1,676 mm) broad gauge
- Electrification: Yes
- Operating speed: 130 km/h

The Prayagraj–Jabalpur section is a railway line connecting Prayagraj and Jabalpur. This 366 km (227 mi) track is part of the Howrah–Prayagraj–Mumbai line. The main line is under the jurisdiction of North Central Railway and West Central Railway.

== History ==
The East Indian Railway, which had established the Howrah–Delhi main line via Allahabad, opened the Allahabad–Jabalpur branch line in June 1867. The Great Indian Peninsula Railway connection reached Jabalpur from Itarsi on 7 March 1870, linking up with the EIR track there from Allahabad, and establishing connectivity between Mumbai and Kolkata.

The Jhansi–Manikpur line was opened in 1889 by Indian Midland Railway.

The Mahoba–Khajuraho branch line was inaugurated in 2008.

== Electrification ==
Prayagraj to Jabalpur section is completely electrified.

== Speed limits ==
The Prayagraj–Bhusawal section is classified as 'B' class where trains can run up to 130 km/h. On the branch lines trains can run up to 100 km/h.

== Passenger movement ==
Prayagraj, Satna, Katni and Jabalpur, on the main line are amongst the top hundred booking stations of Indian Railway.

== Loco sheds ==
Both the Katni Diesel Loco Shed and the New Katni Junction Electric Loco Shed are located at New Katni Junction. The former has WDM-2, WDM-3A, WDG-3A, WDG-4, WDG-4D and the only WDG-3C "Cheetah" diesel locomotives. The latter holds 170+ WAG-5 and WAG-7 electric locomotives and has a large marshalling yard attached to it.
