= Bilaspur–Katni line =

Railway route in India

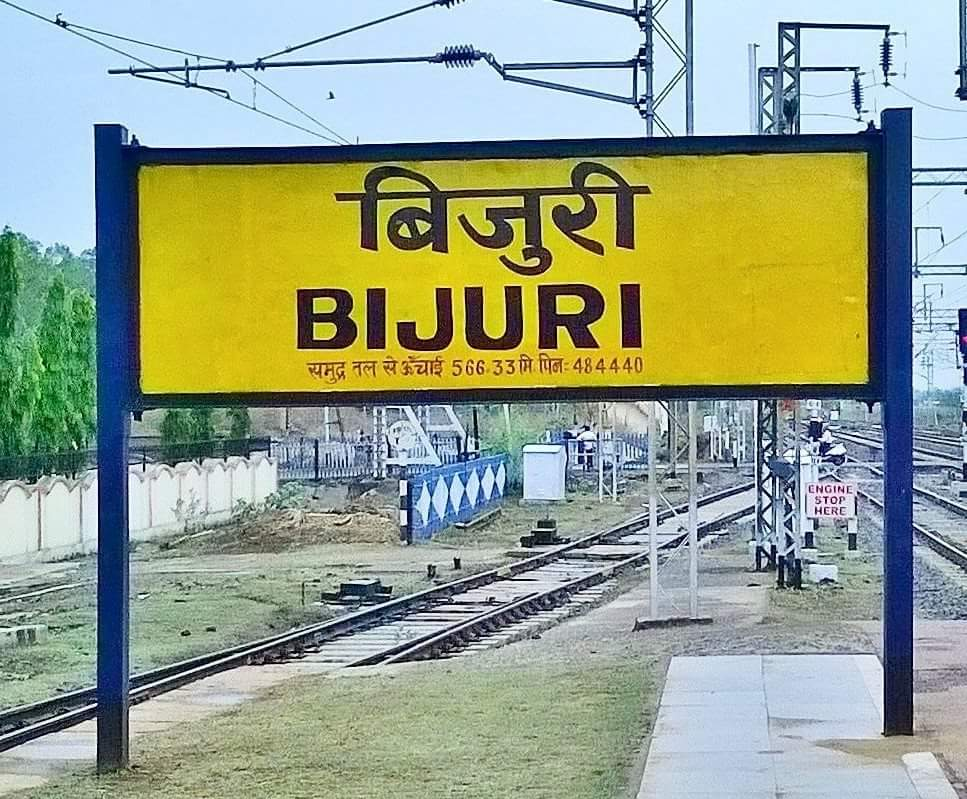
- Bijuri railway station lies on Bilaspur–Katni line

Overview
- Status: Operational
- Owner: Indian Railways
- Locale: Chhattisgarh & Madhya Pradesh
- Termini: Bilaspur Junction; Katni Junction

Service
- Operator(s): South East Central Railway; West Central Railway
- Depot: New Katni
- Rolling stock: WDM-2, WDM-3A, WDG-3A, WDG-3C, WAG-5 and WAG-7, WAP-4, WAP-5, WAP-7

History
- Opened: 1891

Technical
- Line length: Main Line 318.6 km (198 mi); Branch line: Anuppur Junction–Chirimiri line 96.1 km (60 mi); Boridand Junction–Ambikapur line 119.025 km (74 mi)
- Track length: 318.6 km (198 mi)
- Track gauge: 5 ft 6 in (1,676 mm) broad gauge
- Electrification: Yes
- Operating speed: 130 km/h

The Bilaspur–Katni line is a railway route on the West Central Railway & South East Central Railway section of Indian Railways. It is one of the hilly railway routes of the Indian Railways and is fully electrified.

The Bilaspur–Katni line has consisted of hilly areas and reservoirs. The route of this line is via Anuppur, Shahdol & Umaria to Katni with bypassing Amarkantak hill range.

== History ==
- In 1886, was constructed the first section from Katni to Umaria which was also known as Katni–Umaria Provincial State Railway.
- In 1891, the construction was completed by Bengal Nagpur Railway Katni branch with Bilaspur–Etawa Provincial State Railway with the extension up to Bilaspur Junction.
- In 1993, electrification was started from Katni to Anuppur.

== Electrification ==
The electrification of Bilaspur–Katni line was done in the year 1995 and its branches was done in the year 1994.

== Main line & branches ==
Mainline of Bilaspur–Katni Corridor consists of length with 318.6 km (198 mi). This line has two branches first branch line is from Anuppur Junction to Chirimiri with the length of 96.1 km (60 mi) and second branch line is of Boridand Junction to Ambikapur with the length of 119.025 km (74 mi).

The Branch line of Bilaspur–Katni Corridor is also known for the coal producer line because of the production of coal is more in Baikunthpur and Ambikapur. and on the other side the production of limestone is also there on the main line.
