= Katni Junction railway station =

Railway station in Madhya Pradesh, India

KATNI JUNCTION

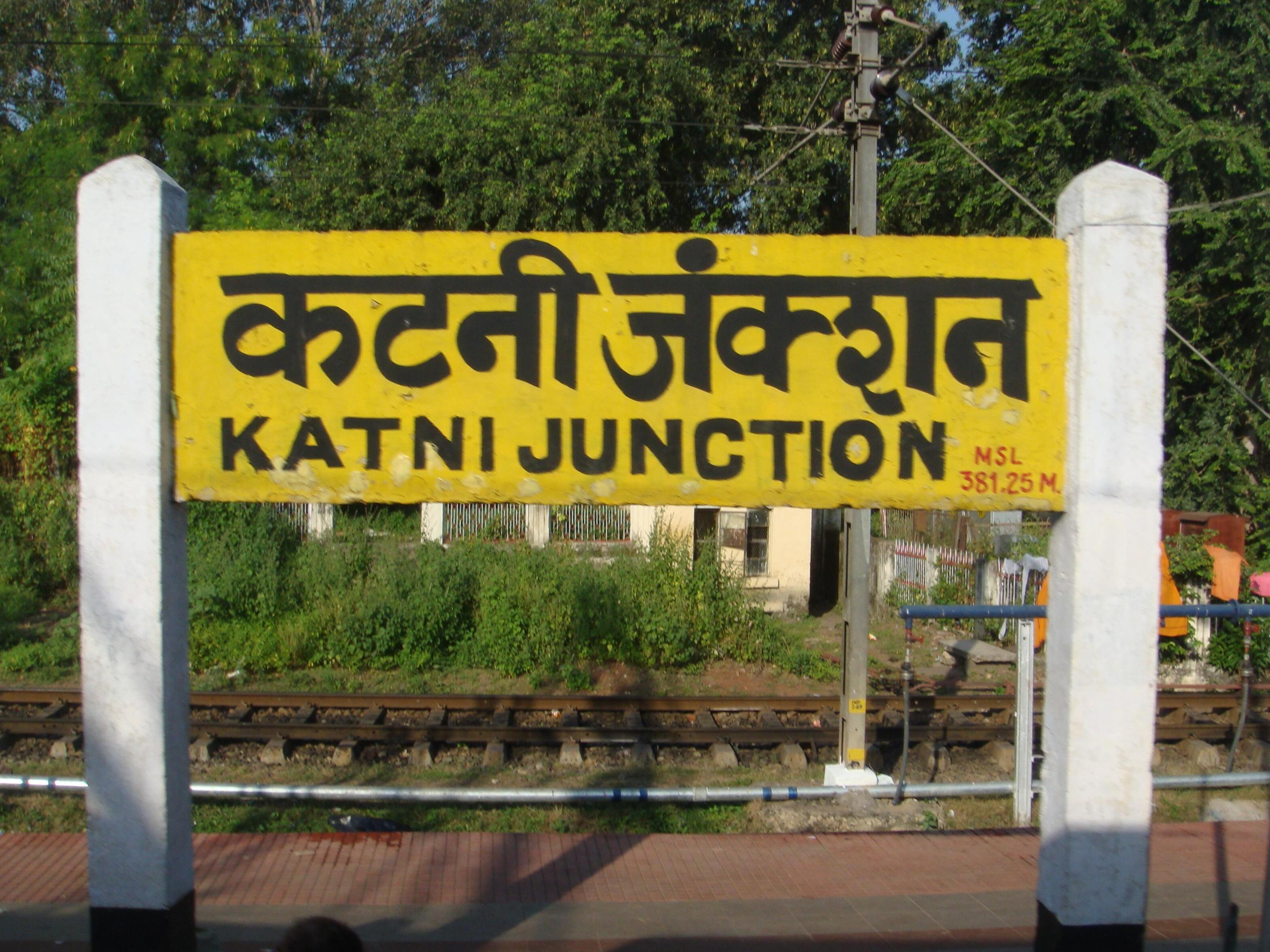
- Katni Station

General information
- Location: Katni-483501, Madhya Pradesh; India
- Coordinates: 23°50′00″N 80°24′04″E
- Elevation: 381.25 metres (1,250.8 ft)
- System: Indian Railways junction station
- Owner: Indian Railways
- Lines: Howrah–Prayagraj–Mumbai line, Prayagraj–Jabalpur section, Bina–Katni line, Katni–Singrauli link, Katni–Bilaspur line
- Platforms: 8
- Tracks: 11

Construction
- Structure type: Standard (On Ground)
- Parking: Yes

Other information
- Status: Functioning
- Station code: KTE
- Zone(s): West Central Railway
- Division(s): Jabalpur
Location
- Location within India Location within Madhya Pradesh
- Interactive map

Katni Junction (Station Code: KTE) is a major rail junction in Katni, India. Rail links from the junction travel in five directions – Bina, Jabalpur, Satna, Bilaspur, Singrauli. Rail links from the junction travel to New Delhi, Mumbai, Vadodara, Howrah, Chennai, Bangalore, Dhanbad, Prayagraj, Kanpur, Lucknow, Bhopal, Indore, Gwalior, Agra, Gorakhpur, Muzaffarpur, Patna, Chandigarh, Ludhiana, Ambala, Bathinda, Jaipur, Jodhpur, Ajmer, Nagpur, Pune, Jammu, Raipur, Bhubaneswar, Visakhapatnam, Hyderabad, Hubli, Madurai, Vasco, Rameshvaram, Kanyakumari, Ernakulam and other Indian cities. To reduce the junction's load the new Katni Murwara & Katni South has been opened to carry trains from Bina and Jabalpur respectively.

== Junction ==
Railway lines from five directions connect at the Katni railway station:

1. From the east (Renukut, Mugal Sarai, Howrah, Kolkata)
  1. Katni–Singrauli–Howrah line via Singrauli that goes to West Bengal, Bihar, Jharkhand
  2. Katni–Bilaspur line that goes further to Chhattisgarh, Odisha
2. From the north (Delhi, Kanpur)
  1. Katni–Prayagraj line that goes to Delhi, Uttarakhand, Uttar Pradesh
3. From the west (Mumbai, Ahmedabad)
  1. Katni–Jabalpur–Itarsi line that goes west, south, southwest
  2. Katni–Bina line that goes to Delhi, Uttarakhand, Uttar Pradesh, Rajasthan

== Picture gallery ==
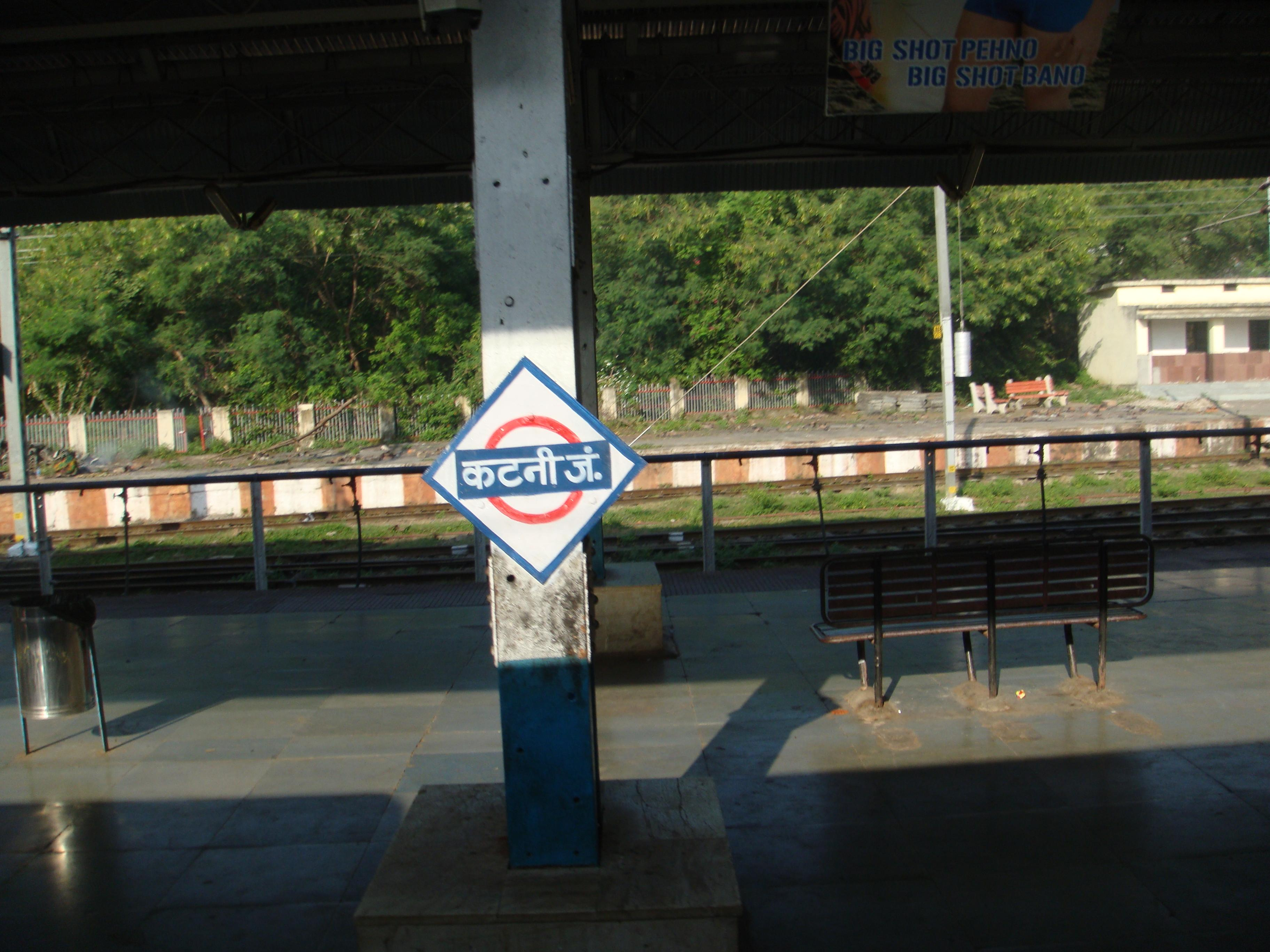
Katni Junction platform board

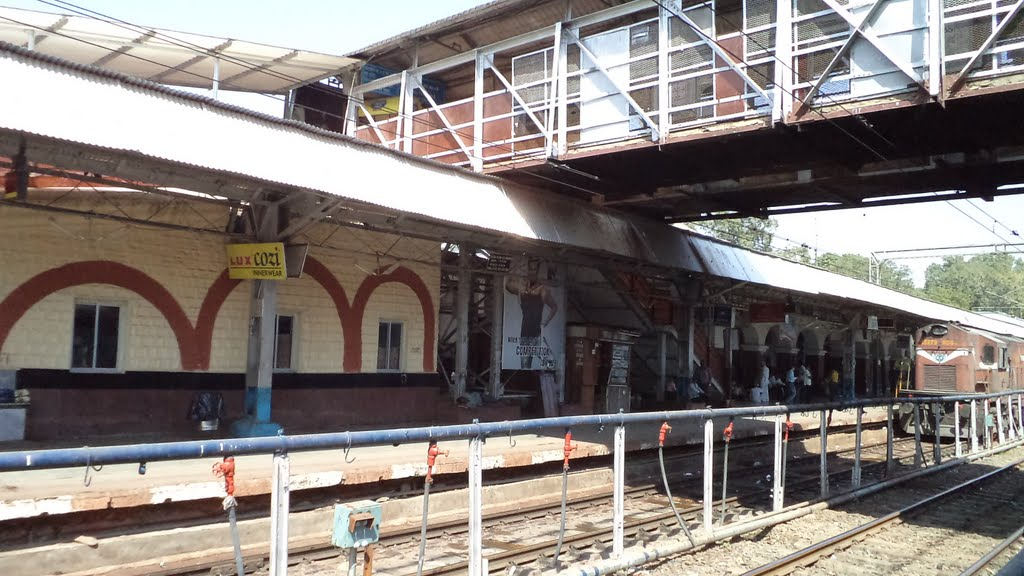
Katni station

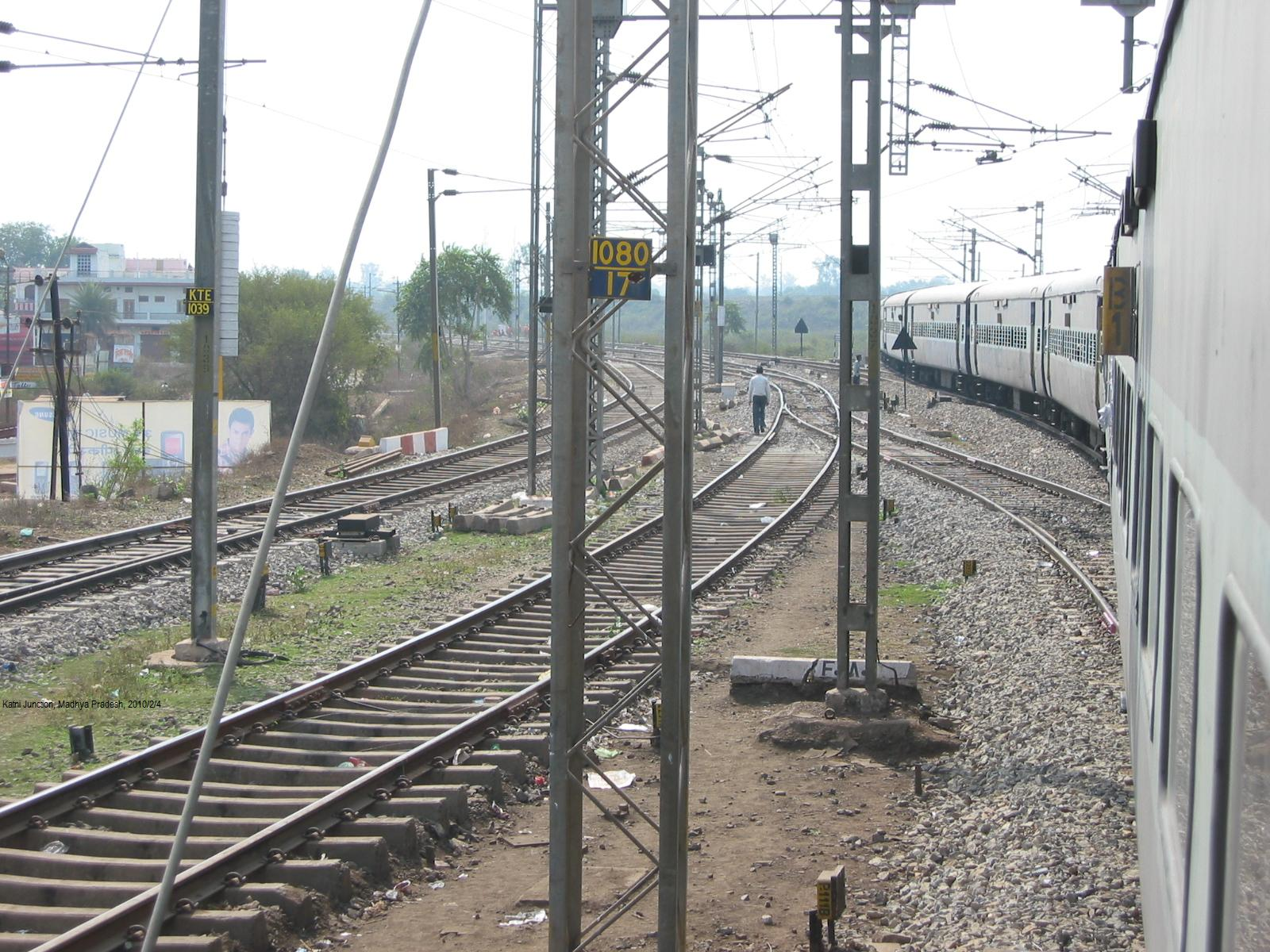
The station's namesake junction

== See also ==
- Katni Murwara
- New Katni Junction
- Katni South
- NKJ
