= Ram Kishore Shukla =

Indian politician

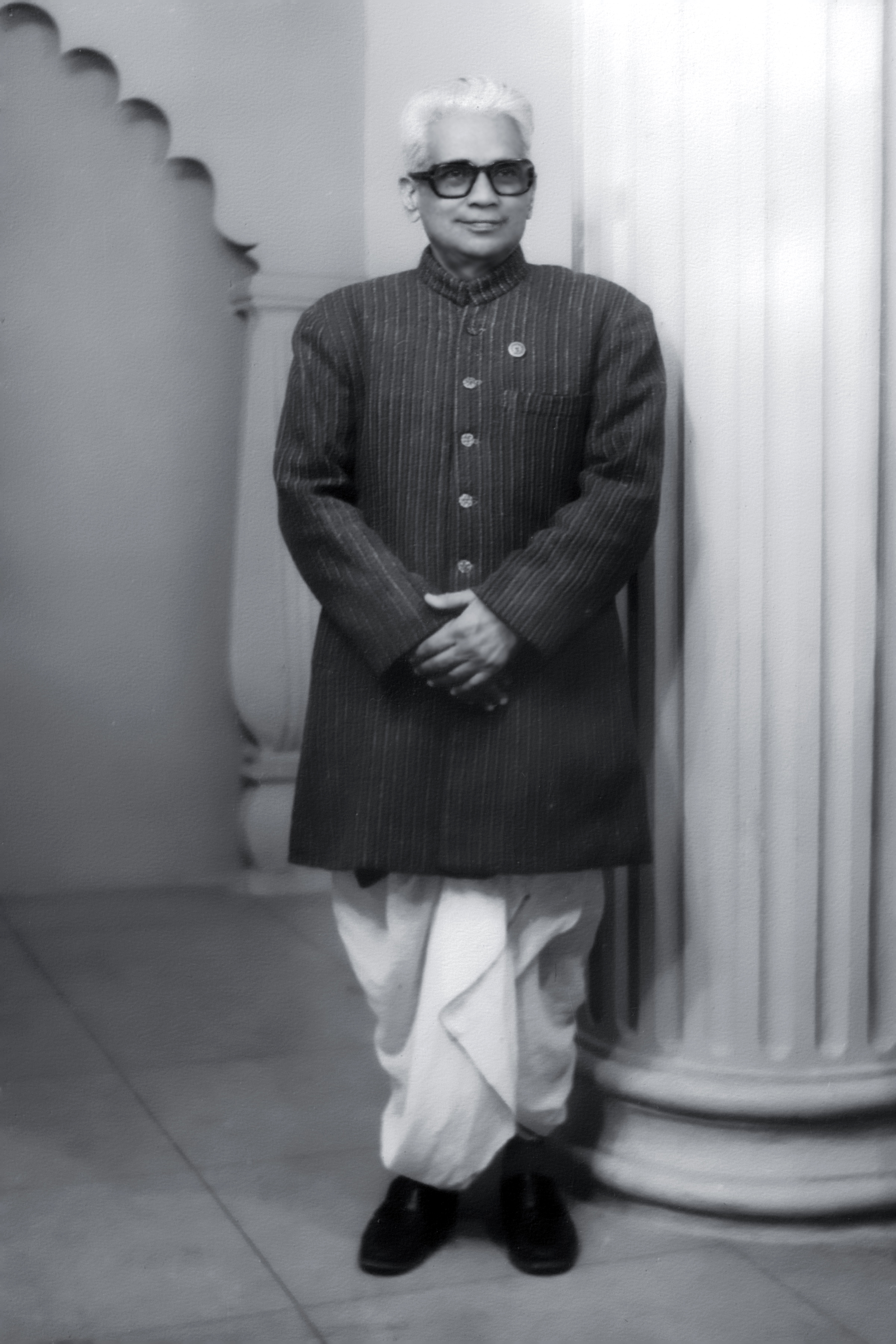
- Shukla in 1982

Speaker of the Legislative Assembly of Madhya Pradesh
- In office 19 July 1983 – 13 March 1985
- Preceded by: Yagya Datt Sharma
- Succeeded by: Rajendra Prasad Shukla

Deputy Speaker of the Legislative Assembly of Madhya Pradesh
- In office 16 September 1980 – 4 March 1984
- Preceded by: Ram Chandra Maheshwari
- Succeeded by: Pyarelal Kanwar
- In office 26 February 1968 – 16 March 1972
- Preceded by: Narmada Prasad Shrivastava
- Succeeded by: Narayan Prasad Shukla

Leader of the Opposition of the Legislative Assembly of Vindhya Pradesh
- In office 21 March 1952 – 31 October 1956
- Preceded by: Office established
- Succeeded by: Office abolished

Minister of Finance of Madhya Pradesh
- In office 14 March 1985 – 13 February 1988
- Preceded by: Arjun Singh
- Succeeded by: Shiv Bhanu Solanki

Minister of Law and Legislative Affairs of Madhya Pradesh
- In office 14 March 1985 – 13 February 1988
- Preceded by: Krishna Pal Singh
- Succeeded by: Arjun Singh

Minister of Separate Revenue of Madhya Pradesh
- In office 14 March 1985 – 13 February 1988
- Preceded by: Bisahu Ram Yadav
- Succeeded by: Kamla Devi

Minister of Parliamentary Affairs of Madhya Pradesh
- In office 14 March 1985 – 13 February 1988
- Preceded by: Krishna Pal Singh
- Succeeded by: Arjun Singh

Personal details
- Born: 4 September 1923 Beohari, Central Provinces and Berar, British India
- Died: 11 December 2003 (aged 80) Rewa, Madhya Pradesh, India
- Resting place: 24.0281507°N 81.3595721°E
- Citizenship: India
- Party: Indian National Congress
- Other political affiliations: Socialist party
- Spouse: Kalavati Shukla
- Children: Banmali Prasad Shukla, Vindhyeshwari Prasad Shukla, Santosh Kumar Shukla, Vinod Kumar Shukla, Surendra Shukla, Kavita Shukla and Anita Shukla
- Education: Darbar College, Rewa
- Occupation: Politics
- Profession: Politician; Lawyer
- Portfolio: Finance, Law & Legislative, Separate Revenue and Parliamentary Affairs
- Website: Ram Kishore Shukla Foundation; Mamkhor Kothi

Pandit Ram Kishore Shukla (Pronounced [ˈraːm kɪˈʃoːr ˈʃʊkla]; Rām Kiśōr Śukla) (4 September 1923 – 11 December 2003) was an Indian politician and an activist for Indian independence.

He represented the Socialist Party and the Indian National Congress as an M.L.A. in the legislative assembly of the state of Madhya Pradesh from Beohari constituency, where he served as speaker, deputy speaker, whereas in cabinet he served as minister of finance, minister of law & legislature, minister of separate revenue, and minister of parliamentary affairs in government of Madhya Pradesh to government of India. He presided over various house committees of the legislative assembly of Madhya Pradesh, in several five-year plans. First to express his views to start live telecast of the meetings of the parliament of India & the legislative assemblies of republic of India on doordarshan at the Commonwealth Parliamentary Association convention in England. During his tenure as cabinet minister for law, he started lok adalat sittings in Madhya Pradesh & thereafter received personal appreciations from Prafullachandra Natwarlal Bhagwati for the same. He was widely travelled, having visited the Soviet Union, England, Japan, United States of America, Kenya, several other republics of Africa, Italy, Germany, Isle of Man etc. to participate in Commonwealth and other similar events. He remained a name for his region because of his political ideologies and principles not only during the Indian independence movement but even after that for more than half of a century until 2003.

== Fight for Freedom and education ==
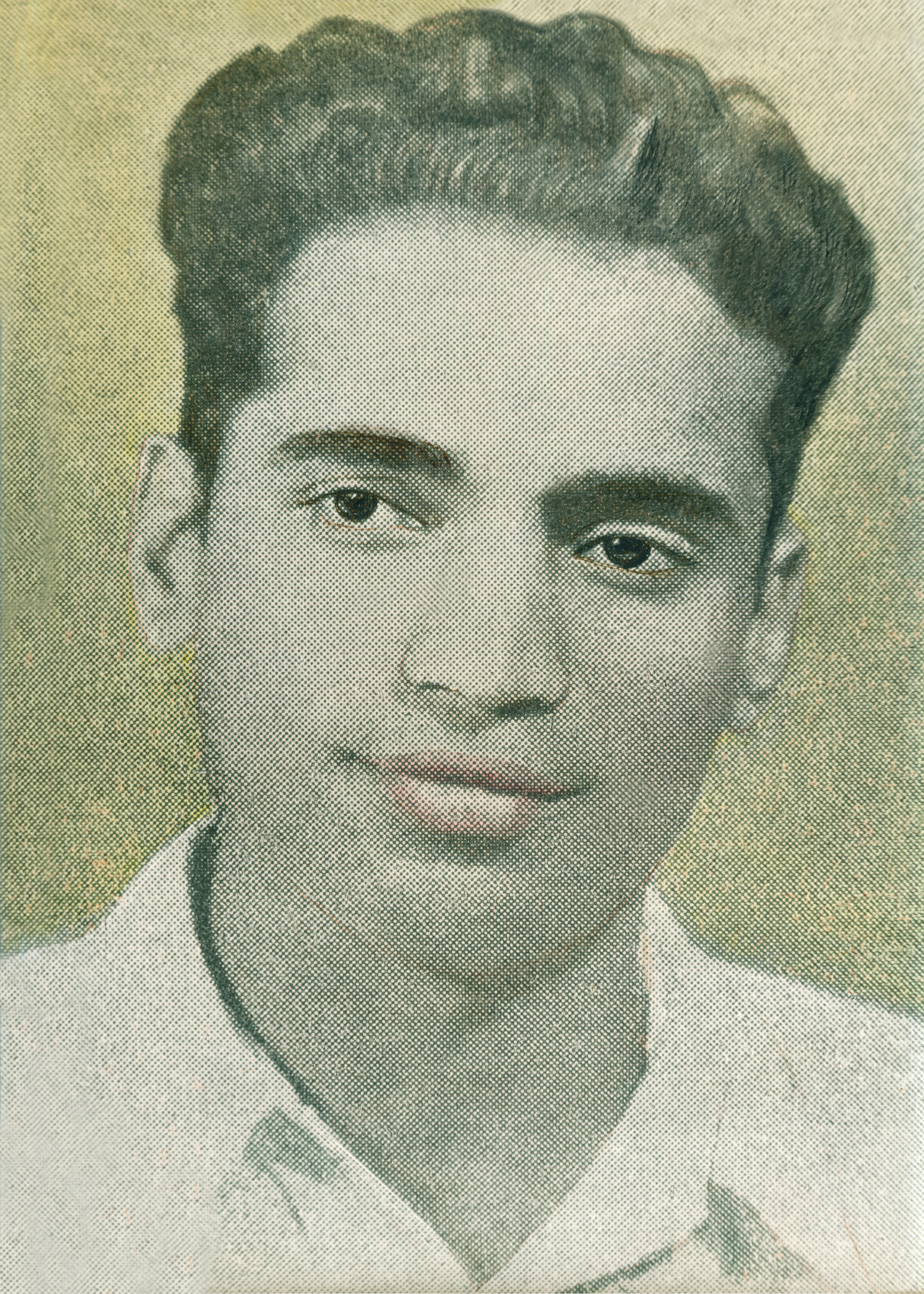
Shukla in 1939.

Shukla, whose ancestors were farmers, held a radical view against the British. He was always willing to be a part of the moves of Congress against the feudalistic English government. Although on the backdrop of the Russian Revolution, he found his thought process very compatible with the philosophy of socialism After he caught his conscience, so only he stood and won the very first election of 1951 under the banner of socialist party. After passing high school, he indulged himself in quit India movement on Gandhi's call for immediate independence with passive resistance and went to attend the mass meeting held at gowalia tank maidan in Bombay, where Do or Die was coined by Gandhi. His higher secondary education was aided by the award of a scholarship in 1942 for his high school examination results. After a period of two years of working, he took a B.A. in political science on the basis of a scholarship from Rewa. Shukla was employed as a teacher at Martand Higher Secondary School in Rewa after his graduation. He subsequently gained a Bachelor of Laws and started legal practice in 1950.

== Political timeline ==
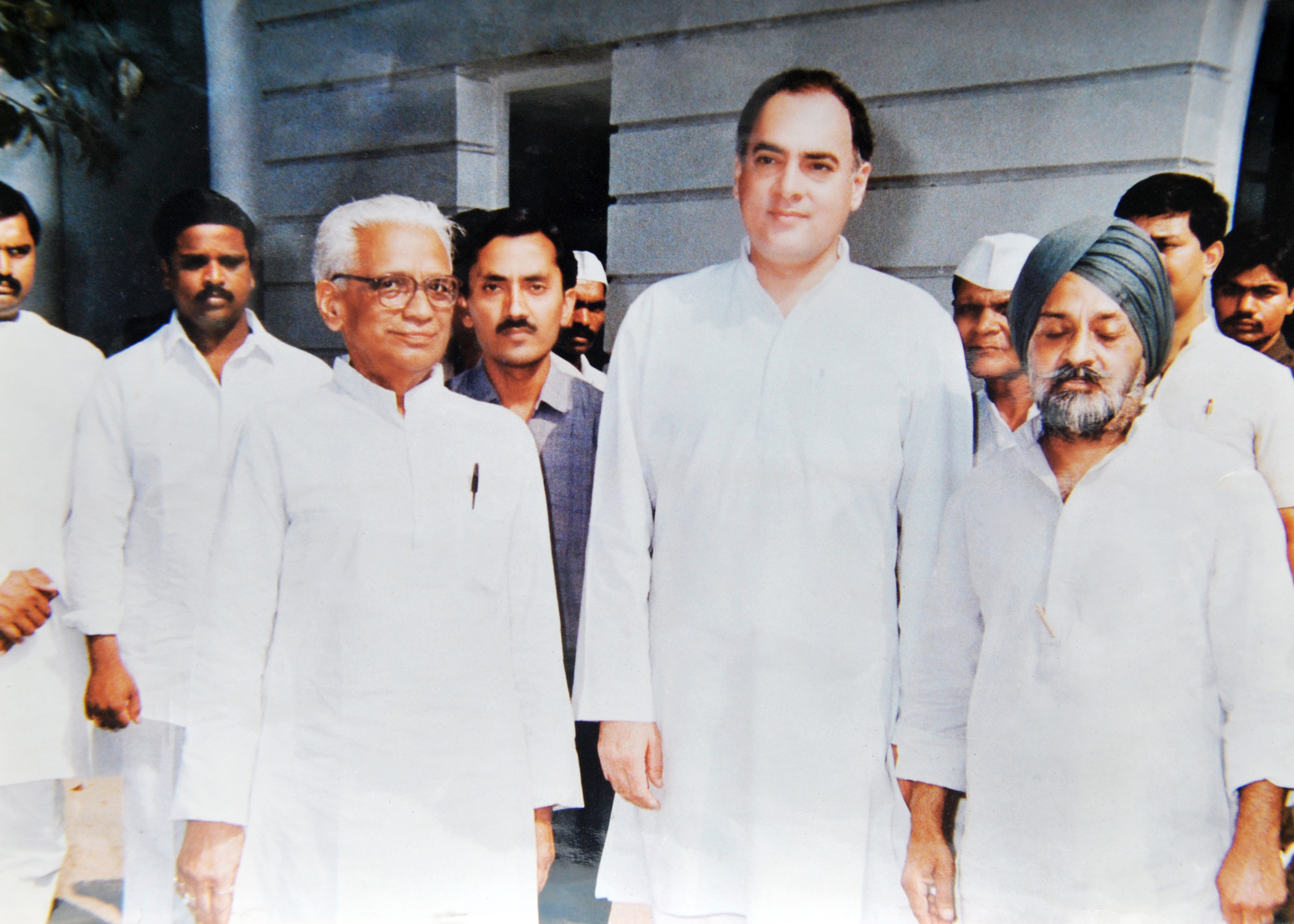
Shukla with Rajiv Gandhi at 7, Race course road in 1988

=== Vindhya Pradesh and Madhya Pradesh ===
In 1950, Shukla was elected as president of the local gram panchayat and nyaya panchayat in Vindhya Pradesh. He was a keen observer of Cooperative movement in India that is why after freedom he was elected as president of rural cooperative committee of Beohari, marketing co-operative committee, central co-operative banks of Rewa and Shahdol districts, also kept himself indulged in conservation of cooperative institutes. He was initially an exponent of socialism, often counted in the establishment of socialist party in his region, he won beohari constituency seat in the very first general elections of Vindhya Pradesh in 1951 from socialist party only. Although Indian National Congress was in majority, he was one of the 11 who were in Legislative Assembly of Vindhya Pradesh from Socialist Party, the main opposition party. Shukla was unanimously elected the Leader of the Opposition of the Legislative Assembly of Vindhya Pradesh. The undivided Madhya Pradesh was founded on 1 November 1956 he won 1957 general elections as an independent candidate. Although, upon the requisition by Jawaharlal Nehru that all people of socialist cerebration should join Indian National Congress for effective establishment of socialistic society he joined congress party, under which he won the general elections of 1962, 1967, 1980, 1985 and 1993. He remained representative of Beohari Vidhan Sabha constituency for a total of seven times, he was one of the few who scored hat-trick in assembly elections from his region. He was known to be a sharp speaker and prime apprehender of parliamentary system.

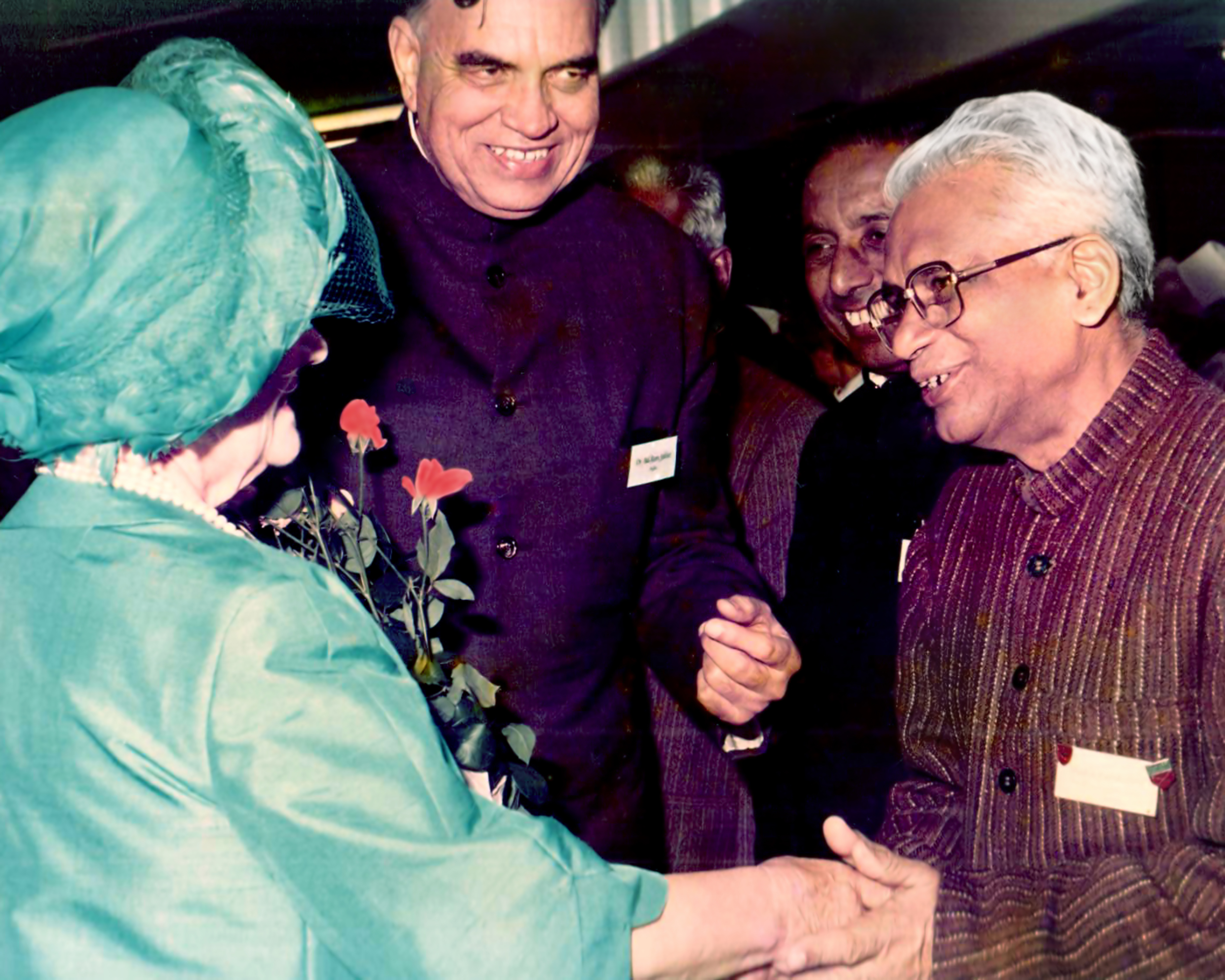
Shukla with Dr. Balram Jakhar and Queen Mother Elizabeth at Buckingham Palace in 1984

=== Speaker-ship and Ministerial Tenure ===
He served as a deputy speaker of the assembly for two times in 1968–1972 and 1980–1984. After the resignation of Yagya Datt Sharma in July 1983 who was speaker then, he took charge of executing Speaker and represented in Commonwealth Parliamentary Association conventions of Kenya, Italy, Germany in and after September 1983. In March 1984, he was unanimously elected speaker of the State Assembly, then again was called to represent in Common Wealth Parliamentary Association and similar conventions of Isle of Man, England, United States, Japan and Soviet Union. He was the first person to express his views to start live telecast of meetings of Parliament of India & Legislative Assemblies of Indian states on doordarshan in Commonwealth Parliamentary Association convention in England, so that the peoples of the constituencies can see the official workings of assemblies and Parliament and representatives will also take care of their performance before them. At times when he did not represent his constituency he presided more than five house committees of Legislative Assembly of Madhya Pradesh, in several five-year plans, whereas during his seven time spell as a legislator the departments held by him as a cabinet minister were, Minister of Finance, Minister of Separate Revenue, Minister of Law and Legislative and minister of Parliamentary Affairs. During the first monsoon session of him as finance minister and immediate one after Bhopal disaster, he presented his first budget with significant deficit to accommodate humanitarian and rehabilitation funds for Gas tragedy victims.

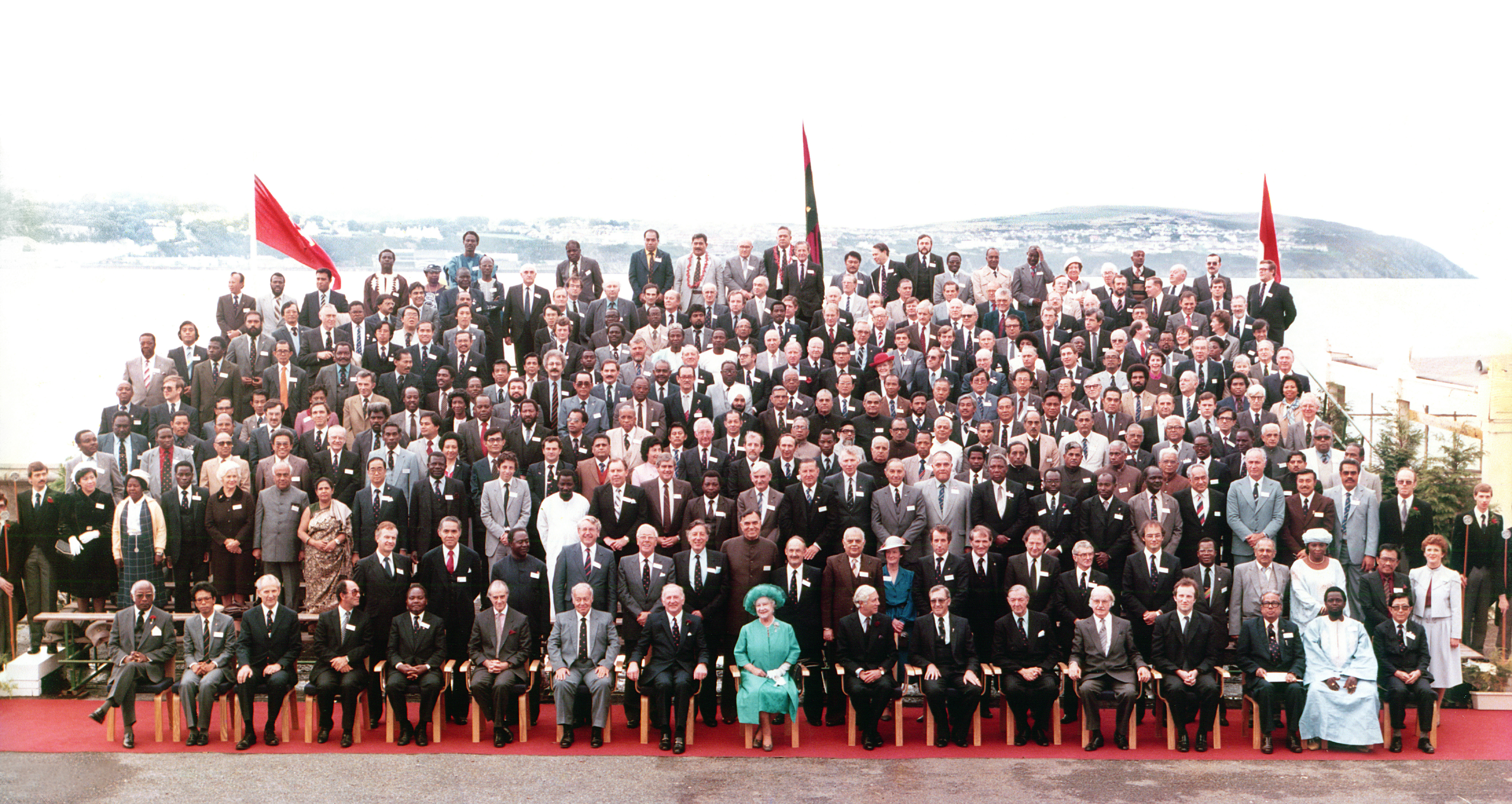
Shukla with Dr. Balram Jakhar, Atal Bihari Vajpayee and other members of Indian & foreign delegations along with Queen Mother Elizabeth seated at front after 30th Commonwealth Parliamentary Association conference at The Isle of Man in October 1984

=== Regional participation ===
Believing education as the key to improving the lot of his primarily rural constituency, Shukla supported the educational establishments in the area. He was a member of the secondary education board and court of Dr. Hari Singh Gour University and established the Arts & Commerce College in Beohari, which was later named after him. He was also, at various times, president of Commonwealth Parliamentary Association of Madhya Pradesh, Shahdol Central Cooperative Bank and Bar Association and deputy president of the directorial board of Shahdol Law College.

== Controversies ==
=== 1984 controversial promotion ===
In 1984, he promoted one officer of the state legislature as special secretary and within hours the same officer was promoted to the post of secretary. This was done by virtue of the extraordinary powers vested in him as Speaker. This promotion, being first of its kind in history, was not appreciated by anyone.

=== 1987 circus shootout and double murder ===
In 1987, during his tenure as minister, three people were shot in a public gunfire at a circus in Beohari. Shukla's sons were connected with the case. Circus was being run in front of police station in Beohari. First information report stated, shukla's third and fourth son were eye witnessed to be linked with the attackers. Three circus employees, including a woman trapeze artist, were injured following an altercation that took place over the purchase of tickets, witnesses also reported that shots were fired on. Hooligans those were implicated were close associates of shukla's sons and were already facing criminal charges against them. Shukla's sons also had a few pending cases against them. Although anticipatory bail for his fourth son was turned down by district judge at shahdol, the police administration was profoundly afraid to act in the case as the government's actions were stalled. The BJP held a public meeting to condemn and demand shukla's and chief minister's resignation on moral grounds. Kailash Chandra Joshi, then opposition leader, charged: "The government is deliberately suppressing facts in the case and shielding the influential accused". Government had ordered CID enquiry and officer in charge was transferred as district police captain Nandan Dubey, who later became state police chief, found him dubious. All these accusations were denied by Shukla's sons, saying that their political rivals from opposition parties in the city and capital were trying to humiliate them and their father's image. Shukla himself insisted that the whole thing was a political game aimed at hurting him.

== Personal life and family ==
Shukla's family has its roots as Pandit Ram Sundar Shukla, son of Pandit Shyam Sundar Shukla, a patwari (d.1968), and his wife Buddhi Shukla, a housewife (d.1980). They had four sons and two daughters named Ram Kishore Shukla, Bhagwati Prasad Shukla, Ganga Prasad Shukla, Durga Shankar Shukla, Archana Shukla and Leela Shukla.

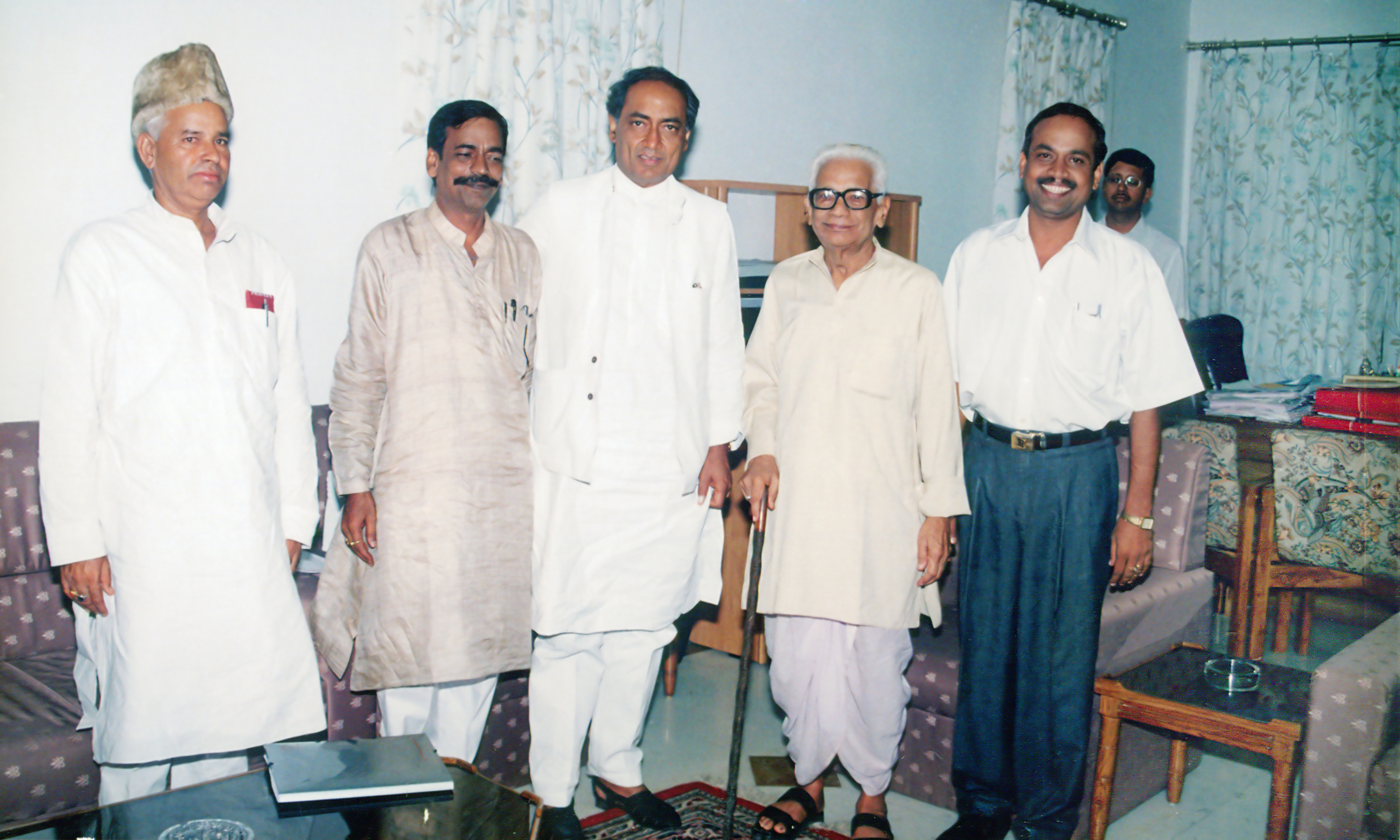
Shukla with Digvijaya Singh, Santosh Kumar Shukla, Dr. Surendra Shukla and Lal Bahadur Singh (extreme left) at chief minister house, 6 Shyamla hills, Bhopal in 2002

Shukla married a farmer's daughter, Kalavati Shukla, in 1944, they have issues, seven children - five sons and two daughters named Banmali Prasad Shukla, Vindhyeshwari Prasad Shukla, Santosh Kumar Shukla, Vinod Kumar Shukla, Surendra Shukla, Kavita Shukla and Anita Shukla, among them Santosh Kumar Shukla is known as his political successor from Congress party. He is also deputy president of district congress committee of Shahdol district at Madhya Pradesh Congress Committee and others are officers in various state/central cadres, like Vindhyeshwari Prasad Shukla who is deputy secretary of legislative assembly of Madhya Pradesh, Vinod Shukla is assistant commissioner in Bhopal Municipal Corporation and Surendra Shukla who is zonal director at ministry of youth affairs and sports is also a spare time writer & poet. Some of his creations include Pratiksha, Mati ko naman, Mere desh ki mati. Also, he has sung a number of patriotic songs and played principal characters for DD Madhya Pradesh daily serials like Hasina Manzil. His fifth daughter-in-law Urmila Surendra Shukla is an Indian Administrative Service officer of 2008 batch of Madhya Pradesh cadre. She was a notable additional district magistrate, deputy commissioner of Bhopal who also had been deputy secretary of Government of Madhya Pradesh and additional director of higher education department of Madhya Pradesh, is currently posted as director of Water and Land Management institute, Bhopal, Madhya Pradesh. His first daughter, Kavita Shukla, who is married to the first son of Bhagwan Datt Sharma is a high-school principal nowadays in Rewa, Madhya Pradesh and the other one is a housewife. His personal belongings, possessions and awards can still be observed at Kishore Kala Mandir, which is the private residence of the family.

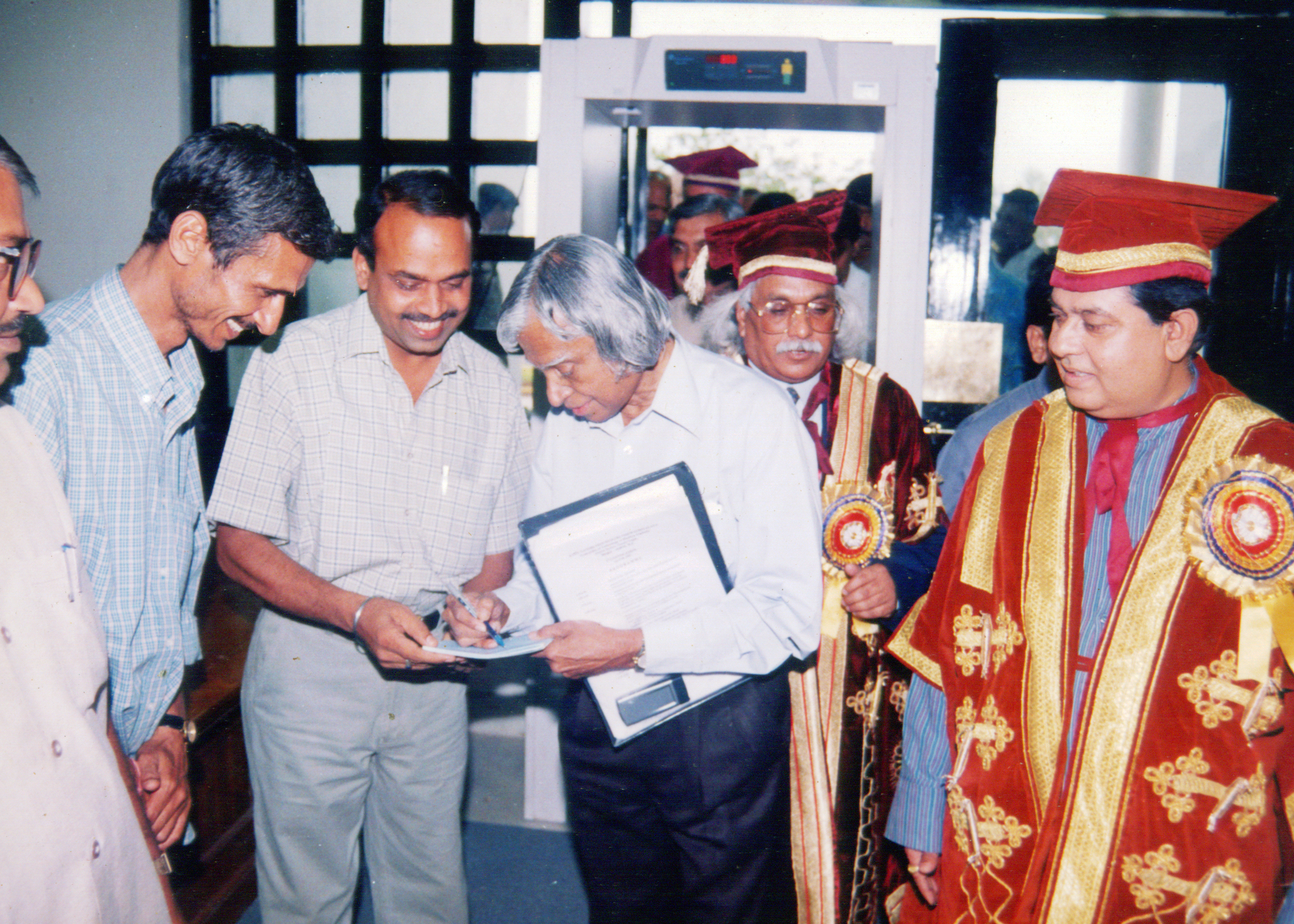
Vindhyeshwari Prasad Shukla (partially appearing at left) and Dr. Surendra Shukla (middle) receiving personal notations from A. P. J. Abdul Kalam in 2002

The second son of Ram Sundar Shukla immediately younger than Ram Kishore Shukla is Bhagwati Prasad Shukla, a doctor of philosophy from Agra university, awarded so for his contributions in the field of Hindi and Bagheli languages was the second notable figure in the second generation. His book, Bagheli Bhasha aur Sahitya, is the original book from which one can get all the basic knowledge about Bagheli language and Bagheli culture. He had issues, two sons and three daughters among which Rashmi Shukla has been joint director of Madhya Pradesh school education, nowadays principal of government college of education, Rewa. Ganga Prasad Shukla was the third son to Ram Sundar Shukla who was retired from the post of principal in a government school. Durga Shankar Shukla is the youngest of all who has had his entire life spent in the care of family farms and ranches.

Shukla's grandson and son of Surendra Shukla, Eeshan Surendra Shukla is a National Bal Shree awardee and a national level swimmer.

== Death ==
Diagonised with diabetes in his 40s, Shukla spent most of his life on medication. On 10 November 2003, when the general elections were taking place in Madhya Pradesh, he suffered a cerebral hemorrhage. He was referred to be admitted to All India Institute of Medical Sciences, but since elections were going on, no government plane was available. As a result, he had to be treated in Rewa, Madhya Pradesh. After a month of unconsciousness, Shukla died on 11 December 2003.

== Career chronology ==
- Earned a Bachelor of Arts degree in political science from Darbar College, Rewa in 1947.
  - Elected as the president for the student union.
  - Employed as a teacher at Martand Higher Secondary School in Rewa after graduation.
- Gained a Bachelor of Laws from law college, Rewa and started legal practice in 1950.
  - Elected as president for law college society.
  - Elected as deputy president of law college, Shahdol.
- Elected as president of the local gram panchayat and nyaya panchayat in 1950.
- Elected as Socialist Party legislator from Beohari Vidhan Sabha constituency to the Legislative Assembly of Vindhya Pradesh in 1951.
  - Elected as the Leader of the Opposition of the Legislative Assembly of Vindhya Pradesh.
- Elected as an independent legislator from Beohari Vidhan Sabha constituency to Legislative Assembly of Madhya Pradesh in 1957.
- Elected as Socialist Party legislator from Beohari Vidhan Sabha constituency to Legislative Assembly of Madhya Pradesh in 1962.
  - Elected as leader of socialist party legislators in the house.
  - Elected as regional president of Madhya Pradesh socialist party.
- Joined Indian National Congress party in 1964.
  - Elected as president of district congress committee, Shahdol.
- Elected as Indian National Congress party legislator from Beohari Vidhan Sabha constituency to Legislative Assembly of Madhya Pradesh in 1967.
  - Elected as Deputy Speaker of Legislative Assembly of Madhya Pradesh.
- Elected as president of public accounts' committee, estimating committee and special rights' committee on various five-year plans.
- Elected as Indian National Congress party legislator from Beohari Vidhan Sabha constituency to the Legislative Assembly of Madhya Pradesh in 1980.
  - Elected as Deputy Speaker of Legislative Assembly of Madhya Pradesh.
  - Elected as Speaker of Legislative Assembly of Madhya Pradesh.
- Elected as Indian National Congress party legislator from Beohari Vidhan Sabha constituency to the Legislative Assembly of Madhya Pradesh in 1985.
  - Appointed as cabinet minister for Finance, Law & Legislative, Separate Revenue and Parliamentary Affairs.
- Elected as Indian National Congress party legislator from Beohari Vidhan Sabha constituency to the Legislative Assembly of Madhya Pradesh in 1993.
  - Elected as Pro tem Speaker of the house in 1993.

== See also ==
- Bansagar Dam
- Son Bridge

== Citations ==
Political offices
| Preceded by Yagya Datt Sharma | Speaker of Legislative Assembly of Madhya Pradesh; 1983–1985 | Succeeded by Rajendra Prasad Shukla |
| Preceded by Ram Chandra Maheshwari | Deputy Speaker of Legislative Assembly of Madhya Pradesh; 1980–1984 | Succeeded by Pyare Lal Kanwar |
| Preceded by Narmada Prasad Shrivastava | Deputy Speaker of Legislative Assembly of Madhya Pradesh; 1968–1972 | Succeeded by Narayan Prasad Shukla |
| Preceded by Office established | Leader of the Opposition of the Legislative Assembly of Vindhya Pradesh; 1952–1956 | Succeeded by Office abolished |
| Preceded by Arjun Singh | Minister of Finance of Madhya Pradesh; 1985–1988 | Succeeded by Shiv Bhanu Solanki |
| Preceded by Krishna Pal Singh | Minister of Law and Legislative Affairs of Madhya Pradesh; 1985–1988 | Succeeded by Arjun Singh |
| Preceded by Bisahu Ram Yadav | Minister of Separate Revenue of Madhya Pradesh; 1985–1988 | Succeeded by Kamla Devi |
| Preceded by Krishna Pal Singh | Minister of Parliamentary Affairs of Madhya Pradesh; 1985–1988 | Succeeded by Arjun Singh |
