= Nipaniya =

Village in Madhya Pradesh, India

Nipaniya is a village in Beohari Tehsil in Shahdol District of Madhya Pradesh State, India. It belongs to Shahdol Division. It is located 95 km north of the district headquarters of Shahdol, 31 km from Beohari Tehsil and 454 km from the State capital, Bhopal.

== Geography ==
Nipaniya is located at 24° 12′ 0″ N, 79° 14′ 0″ E. It is divided into three Zones as per the Department of Land record and revenue of mp as Nipaniya 339, Nipaniya 340 Nipaniya 341 .

It has an average elevation of 361.560m above mean sea level. It is 3.72 km distant on north 11 km on west from the neareast Bansagar reservoir water. In a broad way it is surrounded by bansagar reservoir at an average radius of 6.5 km in north, west, and north- south but is at a very safe margin of 19.92m above FRL of Bansagar Reservoir. The terrain at the village is undulated but has a pattern of a hill i.e. highest at the center of village and continuously decreasing radially towards border. Because of this terrain pattern most of its border areas are suitable for agriculture which are supposed to be irrigated by the small narrow non-perennial channels.

== Demographics ==
As of 2011 India census the following details are conforming to the village of Nipaniya:

Details	value
Number of Households	665
Total Population	3,202
Total Population Male	1,618
Total Population Female	1,584
Population in the age group 0-6	493
Population in the age group 0-6 Male	265
Population in the age group 0-6 Female	228
Scheduled Castes population	152
Scheduled Castes population Male	86
Scheduled Castes population Female	66
Scheduled Tribes population	1,464
Scheduled Tribes population Male	742
Scheduled Tribes population Female	722
Literate Population	1,806
Literate Population Male	1,065
Literate Population Female	741
Illiterate Population	1,396
Illiterate Male	553
Illiterate Female	843
Total Worker Population Person	1,048
Total Worker Population Male	765
Total Worker Population Female	283

== Agriculture ==
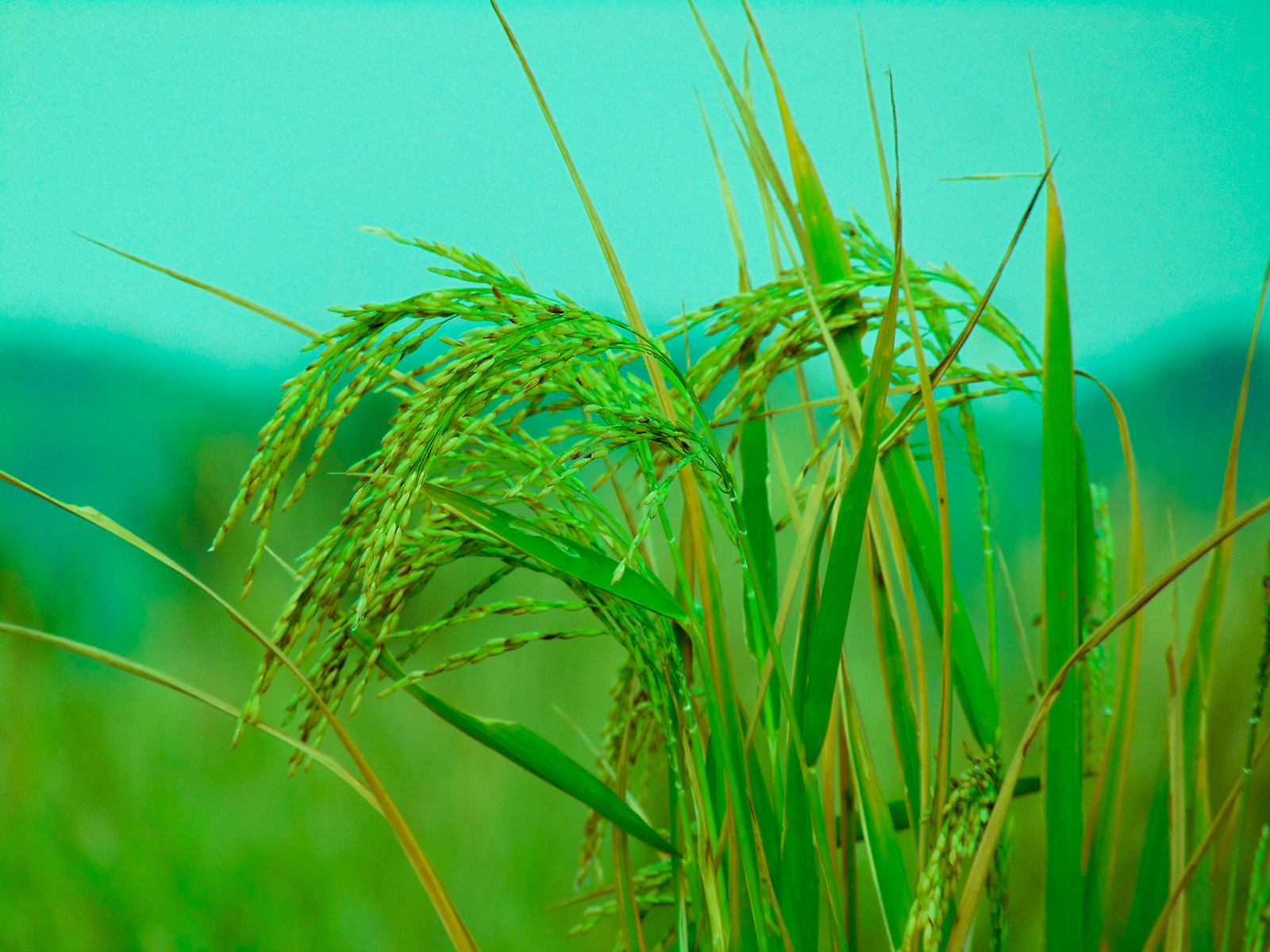

Agriculture is counted as the chief economic occupation of the population. Rice and wheat farming has become one of the most harvested crops in Nipaniya due to a balanced temperature and the soil of the field which is loose, friable and deep.

The main crops are paddy, cereals like maize, sorghum, kodo-kutki and other small millet, pulses like tuar and udhad and oil seeds like til, groundnut, soya-bean and sunflowers are also grown.

Being hilly and plain rolling mixed terrain, canal irrigation facility is mostly unavailable in the village. Until 2000 the most farmers were dependent on tropical rainfall but currently most of the farmers have made their field irrigated by mechanical means like tube wells, diesel pumps and open wells.

== Forest ==
Palas tree, Mango tree, Vachellia nilotica, Neem, and Mahua are the main trees found in the village. The nearest forest area of Murchour is touched by Bnadhavgadh National Park.

== Education ==
=== College ===
Nipaniya village has an IGNOU open college.

=== School ===
1. Government Higher secondary school
2. Government Girls school Nipaniya
3. Sarswati Shishu Mandir Nipaniya
4. Government Middle School
5. 3 Government Primary Schools

== Telecom facility ==
Following services by BSNL (2G), Airtel, Reliance GSM & CDMA, Tata Docomo, Virgin Mobile, Idea (3G), Vodafone, videocon and is available at Nipaniya.

== Connectivity ==
=== Road transport ===
Nipaniya is connected by All weather Major District Road to Beohari which in turn connects to Rewa Satna, Shahdol, Sidhi and Umaria.

=== Railways ===
Nearest railway station is VIJAYSOTA (VST) and there are direct trains to Jabalpur, Katni, Sagar, Singrauli. VST is an important station between Katni -Singrauli route.
