= Krishna Pal Singh =

Indian politician (b. 1922, d. 1999)

Krishnapal Singh
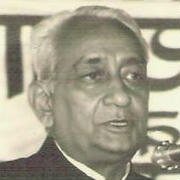

14th Governor of Gujarat
- In office 1 March 1996 – 24 April 1998
- Preceded by: Naresh Chandra
- Succeeded by: Anshuman Singh

Minister of Madhya Pradesh Government
- In office 1962–1990
- Constituency: Sohagpur (Shahdol)

MLA
- In office 1998–1999
- In office 1967–1993
- Constituency: Sohagpur (Shahdol)
- In office 1962–1967
- Constituency: Burhar

Personal details
- Born: 10 January 1922 Biruhuli, Shahdol
- Died: 27 September 1999 (aged 77) Bhopal, India
- Party: Indian National Congress
- Spouse: Smt. Tara Devi
- Profession: Lawyer, politician

Krishnapal Singh (10 January 1922 – 27 September 1999) was an Indian activist, politician and a former Governor of Gujarat from Shahdol in Baghelkhand. His career began in the 1940s and ended in the 1990s.

== Early life ==
In high school, he organized many student agitations, demonstrations, satyagrahas, debates and conferences. In college, he was President of P.G. College Students' Union, Rewa and arranged student congresses and volunteer corps. He served throughout the communal riots of 1947–48 and helped Sindhi refugees in their migration.

As a trade union leader, he served as vice president of the Madhya Pradesh unit of the All India Trade Union Congress.

He registered with the Socialist Party in 1946 was an associate of Jaya Prakash Narayan and Ram Manohar Lohia. Singh was the president of the Socialist Party of Vindhya Pradesh and president of the Samyukta Socialist Party in Madhya Pradesh.

He served in varied capacities as a member of the All India Congress Committee (AICC) and therefore the Pradesh Congress Committee (PCC) after 1965 when he was inducted into the Indian National Congress by the late Smt. Indira Gandhi. . He served as Pradesh Congress Committee general secretary with Shankar Dayal Sharma as its president. He served as vice president of the Madhya Pradesh Congress Committee and was a special invitee within the AICC, when Smt. Indira Gandhi was its president.

== Political career ==
Singh was elected seven times to the Madhya Pradesh Vidhan Sabha in 1962, 1967, 1972, 1977, 1980, 1990 and 1998. He was minister five times in the Government of Pandit Dwarka Prasad Mishra, Shyama Charan Shukla, Prakash Chandra Sethi and Arjun Singh up to 1990. He held several portfolios including finance, law, revenue, planning, jail, excise taxation and tourism.

He served as deputy leader in Madhya Pradesh Vidhan Sabha; Party Observer in general elections in Himachal Pradesh, Andhra Pradesh, Karnataka, Rajasthan and West Bengal; PRO for party elections to Himachal Pradesh and West Bengal; and political observer for Bihar, Uttar Pradesh and Gujarat. He was president of the Friends of the Soviet Union (India), India-China Society, Bharat-Nepal Maitri Sangh of Madhya Pradesh Unit. He served as president of the India-Africa Friendship Association and general secretary of the All India Indo-Arab Friendship Society.
