= Kishore Kala Mandir =

Historic building in Beohari, India

Coordinates: 24°01′36.30″N 81°22′41.56″E

Kishore Kala Mandir is a private building situated in Beohari city of Shahdol division in Madhya Pradesh which is serving as a private residence of the family of Pandit Ram Kishore Shukla who was an Indian politician and a former activist for Indian independence. It was founded as a traditional Indian house made up of mud, grass, bamboo and thatch or sticks in 1900 by father of Ram Kishore Shukla and since then continuously been expanded by descendants to the current form having 2 offices, 28 Rooms, 8 Halls 4 Yards & Backyards spreading in about 4 acres (Previously 12 Acres later divided).

== Postal Address ==
Kishore Kala mandir, Near Power House, Beohari, India 484774.

== Occupants ==
- Ram Sundar Shukla (1900–1968)
- Budhhi Shukla (1921–1966)
- Ram Kishore Shukla (1923–2003)
- Kalavati Shukla (1944–Present)
- Banmali Prasad Shukla & Family (Birth - Present)
- Vindhyeshwari Prasad Shukla & Family (Birth - 1975)
- Santosh Kumar Shukla & Family (Birth - Present)
- Vinod Kumar Shukla & Family (Birth - 1990)
- Surendra Shukla & Family (Birth - 1992)
