= Papord =

Village in Madhya Pradesh, India

Coordinates: 23.996°N 81.163°E

Papord is a small village in the Beohari block, Shahdol district in Madhya Pradesh, India. Papord village is the single gram panchayat and biggest single gram panchayat village of Beohari block. Papord has 1,546 voters.
