= Beohari Assembly constituency =

Constituency of the Madhya Pradesh legislative assembly in India

Coordinates: 24°1′25.1″N 81°22′43.2″E

Beohari
- Constituency No. 83 for the Madhya Pradesh Legislative Assembly

Constituency details
- Country: India
- Region: Central India
- State: Madhya Pradesh
- District: Shahdol
- Lok Sabha constituency: Sidhi
- Established: 1951
- Total electors: 278,477
- Reservation: ST

Member of Legislative Assembly
- 16th Madhya Pradesh Legislative Assembly
- Incumbent Sharad Juglal Kol
- Party: Bharatiya Janata Party
- Elected year: 2023
- Preceded by: Rampal Singh

Beohari is one of the 230 Vidhan Sabha (Legislative Assembly) constituencies of Madhya Pradesh state in central India. This constituency came into existence in 1951, as one of the 48 Vidhan Sabha constituencies of the erstwhile Vindhya Pradesh state. It remained double-member until general elections of 1957 after the merge of Vindhya Pradesh into Madhya Pradesh, however it became single-member seat in the general elections of 1962 of Madhya Pradesh.

== Overview ==
Beohari Assembly constituency (constituency number 83) covers the entire Beohari tehsil, Deolond nagar panchayat and part of Jaisinghnagar tehsil of the Shahdol district. This constituency is a part of Sidhi Lok Sabha constituency.

== Members of the Legislative Assembly ==
=== Vindhya Pradesh Legislative Assembly ===
Year	Namel	Party
1952	Ram Kishore Shukla	Socialist Party

=== Madhya Pradesh Legislative Assembly ===
Year	Name	Party
1957	Ram Kishore Shukla	Independent
1962	Ram Kishore Shukla	Socialist Party
1967	Ram Kishore Shukla	Indian National Congress
1967	Ramgopal Gupta	Bharatiya Jana Sangh
1977	Baijnath Singh	Janata Party
1980	Ram Kishore Shukla	Indian National Congress (Indira)
1985	Ram Kishore Shukla	Indian National Congress
1990	Lavkesh Singh	Bharatiya Janata Party
1993	Ram Kishore Shukla	Indian National Congress
1998	Lavkesh Singh	Bharatiya Janata Party
2003	Lavkesh Singh	Bharatiya Janata Party
2008	Bali Singh Maravi	Bharatiya Janata Party
2013	Rampal Singh	Indian National Congress
2018	Sharad Juglal Kol	Bharatiya Janata Party
2023	Sharad Juglal Kol	Bharatiya Janata Party

== Election results ==
=== 2023 ===
2023 Madhya Pradesh Legislative Assembly election: Beohari
Party	Candidate	Votes	%	±%
BJP	Sharad Juglal Kol	102,816	49.09	+8.13
INC	Ramlakhan Singh	76,334	36.44	+16.2
GGP	Purushottam Singh Maravi	21,279	10.16	−13.76
Sapaks Party	Devideen Baiga	3,231	1.54	−0.11
Peoples Party Of India (Democratic)	Ramdarash Majhi	1,993	0.95	
NOTA	None of the above	3,800	1.81	−0.54
Majority		26,482	12.65	−4.39
Turnout		209,453	75.21	−0.4
BJP hold		Swing		

=== 2018 ===
2018 Madhya Pradesh Legislative Assembly election: Beohari
Party	Candidate	Votes	%	±%
BJP	Sharad Juglal Kol	78,007	40.96	
GGP	Tej Pratap Singh Uikey	45,557	23.92	
INC	Rampal Singh	38,557	20.24	
BSP	Ram Vishal Kol	5,004	2.63	
NISHAD	Ajeet Kumar (Ashok)	4,930	2.59	
Sapaks Party	Devideen Baiga	3,151	1.65	
AAP	Dashrath Singh Maravi	2,549	1.34	
Independent	Keshav Kol	2,317	1.22	
Bhartiya Shakti Chetna Party	Gopal Singh Netam	2,252	1.18	
NOTA	None of the above	4,474	2.35	
Majority		32,450	17.04	
Turnout		190,465	75.61	
BJP gain from INC		Swing		

== See also ==
- Beohari
