= Dumar Kachhar =

- Census town
- Location in Madhya Pradesh, India Dumar Kachhar (India)
- Coordinates: 23°11′16″N 82°7′15″E
- Country: India
- State: Madhya Pradesh
- District: Shahdol

Population (2001)
  - Total: 9,730

Languages
  - Official: Hindi
- Time zone: UTC+5:30 (IST)

Dumar Kachhar is a census town in Shahdol district in the state of Madhya Pradesh, India.

== Demographics ==
As of 2001 India census, Dumar Kachhar had a population of 9730. Males constitute 54% of the population and females 46%. Dumar Kachhar has an average literacy rate of 67%, higher than the national average of 59.5%: male literacy is 76% and, female literacy is 57%. In Dumar Kachhar, 13% of the population is under 6 years of age.
