= Amlai =

- Village
- Location in Madhya Pradesh, India Amlai (India)
- Coordinates: 23°11′42″N 81°32′27″E
- Country: India
- State: Madhya Pradesh
- District: Shahdol

Population (2001)
  - Total: 30,292

Languages
  - Official: Hindi
- Time zone: UTC+5:30 (IST)
- Postal code: 492001

Amlai is a census town in Shahdol district in the state of Madhya Pradesh, India.

== Demographics ==
As of 2001 India census, Amlai had a population of 30,292. Males constitute 53% of the population and females 47%. Amlai has an average literacy rate of 65%, higher than the national average of 59.5%; with 61% of the male and 39% of the female population literate. 15% of the population is under 6 years of age.

The census of 2011 recorded a population of 20,677 with males constituting 10,731 and females 9,946.

== Transport ==
Amlai has a railway station on the Bilaspur–Katni line. Many trains halting here. The station code of Amlai station is 'AAL'. It has two platforms. It comes under Bilaspur railway division of South East Central Railway Zone. Total 26 trains departures here.

== Temple ==
1.Birla Mandir (Shri Shri Maa Bhagawati Bhavtarini Mandir, OPM) 2.Maa Sharda Mandir(Sharda OCM) 3.Shankar Ji Mandir (Bakho) 4.Durga Mandir(Near CCS School) 5.Gayatri Bhavan (Near OPM Colony) 6.Shiv Mandir (Near OPM Colony)

== Tourist attractions ==
Near Amlai many tourist Attractions are like_ 1.Chachai Dam (Near Amlai Railway Station) 2.Sone River Dam (Behind OPM Guest House also called as 11 Number) 3. Ghat Section (Near Girwa) 4.Sone River Bridge 5.OPM Club Ground etc.
