= Rampal Singh (INC politician) =

Indian politician

Member of the Madhya Pradesh Legislative Assembly
- In office 2013–2018
- Preceded by: Bali Singh Maravi
- Succeeded by: Sharad Kol
- Constituency: Beohari

Personal details
- Born: 6 July 1976 (age 49) Village Kunda Tola, Shahdol
- Party: Indian National Congress
- Spouse: Sunita Singh
- Education: M.A.
- Profession: Politician
- As of 13 June, 2018 Source: ["Biography:Singh, Rampal" (PDF). Madhya Pradesh Legislative Assembly.]

Rampal Singh is an Indian politician. He is a former member of the Madhya Pradesh Legislative Assembly representing Beohari for the Indian National Congress. He was elected in the 2013 general election.

== See also ==
- Madhya Pradesh Legislative Assembly
- 2013 Madhya Pradesh Legislative Assembly election
