= Bhagwan Datt Sharma =

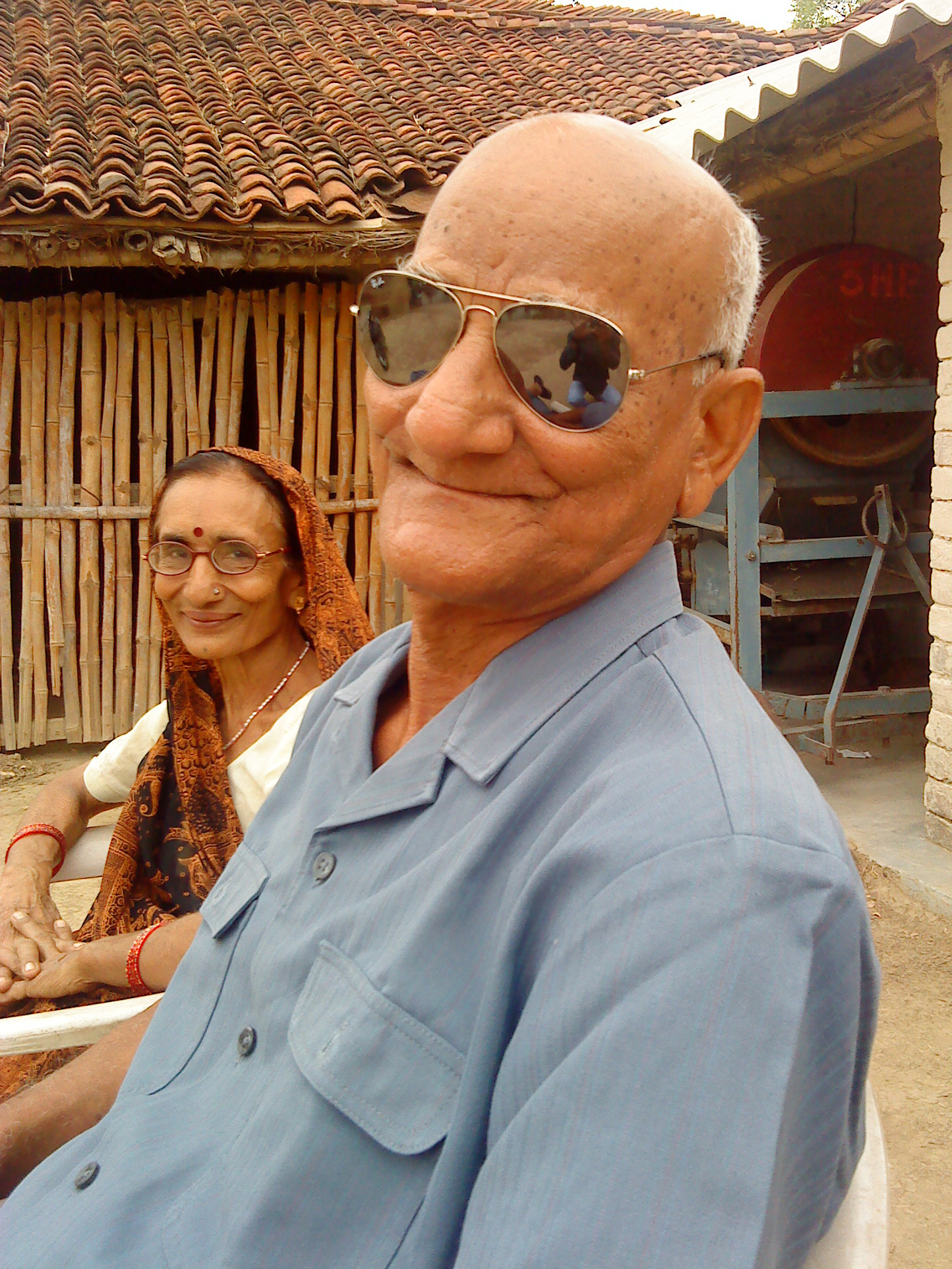
- Born: 23 October 1935; Mangawan, Rewa, Madhya Pradesh, India
- Other names: Pandit ji
- Education: B.A. (English), M.A. (Hindi Literature), M.A. (English literature) and Ph.D.
- Known for: Socialism, Extremism, Socioeconomics, Societal Reforms and School Education
- Spouse: Vidya Bhagwan Datt Sharma
- Children: Shailesh Sharma, Shailja Sharma and Sanjay Sharma

Bhagwan Datt Sharma (23 October 1935) is an academic in the field of English and Hindi literature. In particular, he studies post World War II Madhya Pradesh education reform.

== Personal life ==
Bhagwan was born on 23 October 1935 in Mangawan, India. He is the father in law of first daughter of Ram Kishore Shukla, a preeminent politician and member of the Indian National Congress.

== Career ==
Bhagwan has a Doctor of Philosophy. It was awarded for his comparison of post-World War II Hindi & English poetry. He has also studied Scandinavian literature, Latin literature, English and Hindi poetry.

At the time of his retirement, Bhagwan had been the Deputy Divisional Superintendent of Education.

He is among the founders of the Socialist Party in Rewa.
