= Virateshwar temple =

Hindu temple

Coordinates: 23.299°N 81.356°E

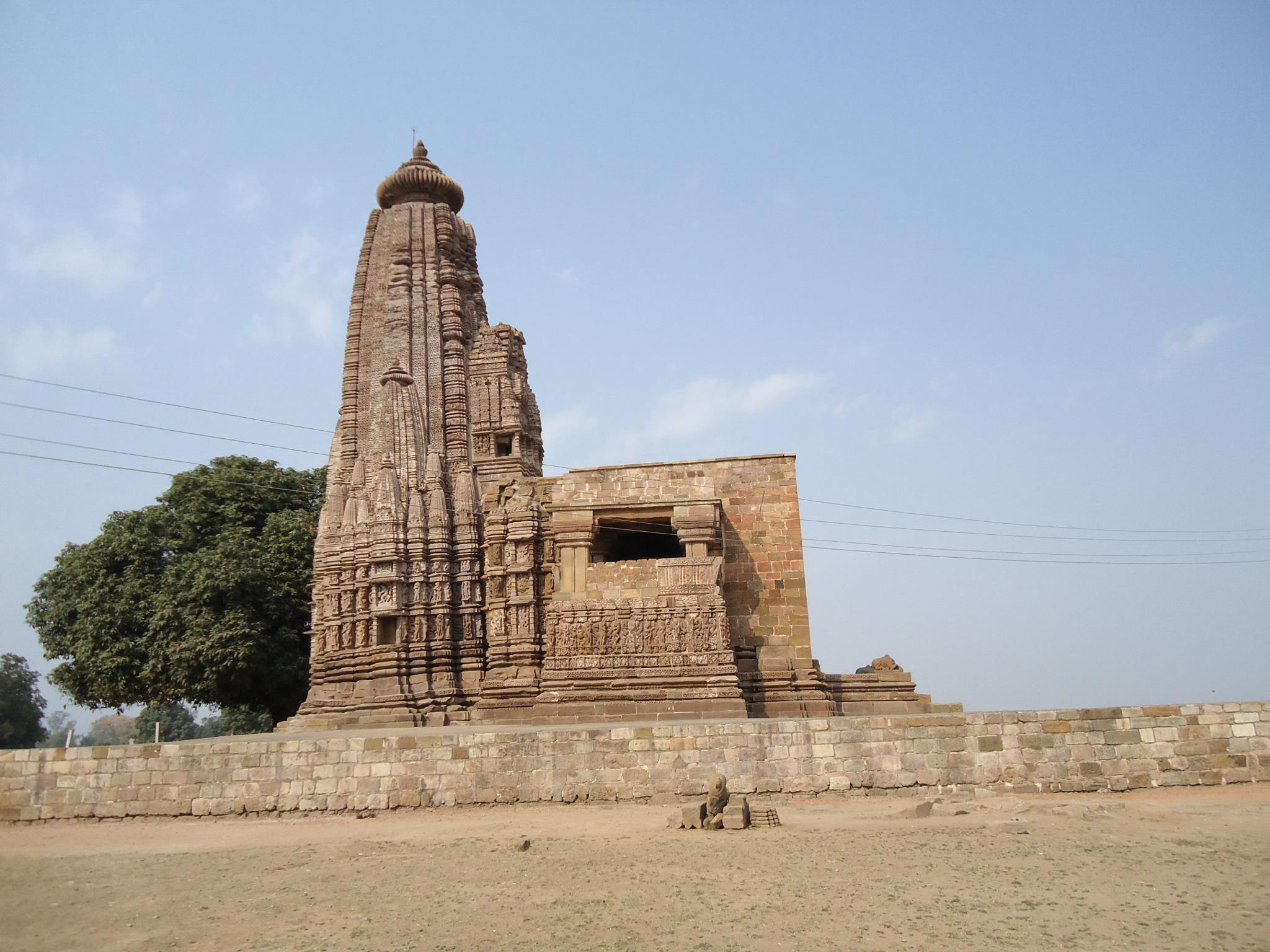
Virateshwar Temple. ASI number N-MP-255

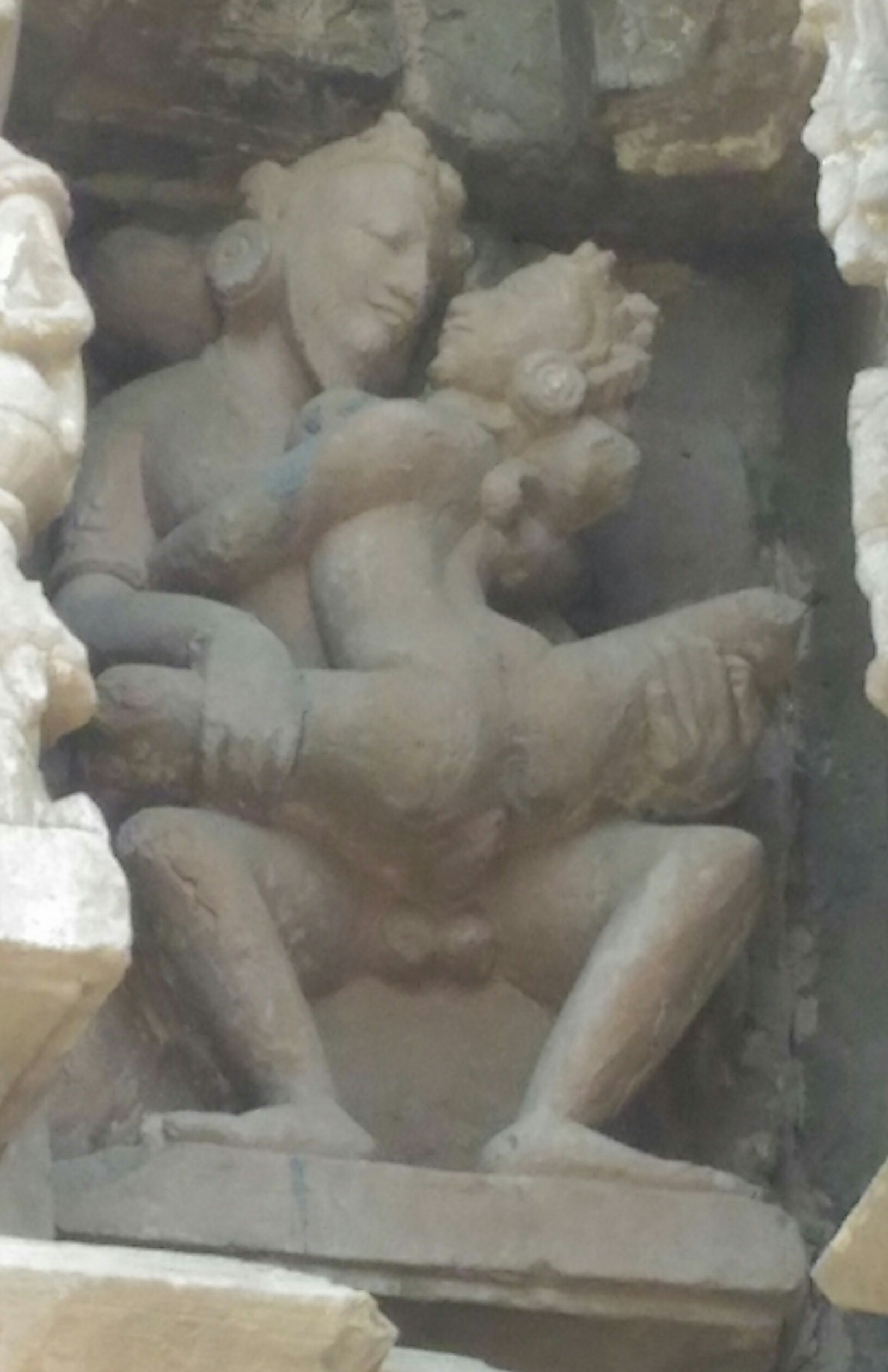
Erotic sculpture at Virateshwar temple

Virateshwar temple or Virat temple of Lord Shiva is located in Sohagpur (Shahdol), Shahdol district of Madhya Pradesh. The Archaeological Survey of India (ASI) Monument number for this temple is N-MP-255. ASI database mentions it as "Virath Temple and remains".

This temple was built by the Kalchuri ruler, Maharaja Yuvarajadeva II between 950 CE and 1050 CE. This was built as a present for the Acharya (saint) of Golkaki Math. This 70 feet tall temple is one of the most famous architectures of the Kalchuri Age. The temple is under the preservation of the Archaeological Survey of India (ASI).

Banganga Mela or Banganga fair was started in 1895 by the then king, Rewa Maharaja Gulab Singh. The fair takes place in the courtyard of the Virat Temple and lasts for five days.

== Location ==
The nearest railway station is the Shahdol Railway station which is around 3-4 km away. The nearest airport is Jabalpur about 180 km away from Shahdol town.
