= Sohagpur (Shahdol) =

Town in Madhya Pradesh, India

- City
- Sohagpur
- Location in Madhya Pradesh, India Sohagpur (India)
- Coordinates: 23.3°N 81.3°E
- Country: India
- State: Madhya Pradesh

Government
  - Type: Bharatiya Janata Party
- Elevation: 508 m (1,667 ft)

Languages
  - Official: Bagheli
- Time zone: UTC+5:30 (IST)
- PIN: 484001
- Website: https://shahdol.nic.in/

Sohagpur is a Town and Tehsil in Shahdol District of Madhya Pradesh. It is one of 4 Tehsils of Shahdol district. There are 318 villages in Sohagpur Tehsil. Rewa State Gazetteer refers to a tradition which connects Sohagpur with King Virata of the epic Mahabharata.

== Demographics ==
According to census 2011, information the sub-district code of Sohagpur Block (CD) is 03691. Total area of Sohagpur tehsil is 1,976 km² including 1,892.23 km² rural area and 83.85 km² urban area. Sohagpur tehsil has a population of 4,86,930 peoples, out of which urban population is 1,76,169 while rural population is 3,10,761. Sohagpur tehsil has a population density of 246.4 inhabitants per square kilometre. There are about 1,11,421 houses in the sub-district, including 36,678 urban houses and 74,743 rural houses.

When it comes to literacy, 60.80% population of sohagpur tehsil is literate, out of which 67.83% males and 53.53% females are literate. There are about 318 villages in sohagpur tehsil.

== Geography ==
Sohagpur is located at 23.3173°N 81.3518°E. It has an average elevation of 508 metres (1669 feet). Son is the local river.

== Tourism ==
Banganga Mela was started by the then Rewa Maharaja Gulab Singh in 1895. Since then, the traditions of the fair are continuing in Banganga. The purpose of the fair is to make an indelible impression in the courtyard of the Virat Temple, built in a thousand years before, it signifies donation and virtue.The reconciliation and enthusiasm of people in the fair remained a witness to the nature of the tribals who love the old customs. When the fair was inaugurated, it was kept for three days. Which is now filling up for 5 days.

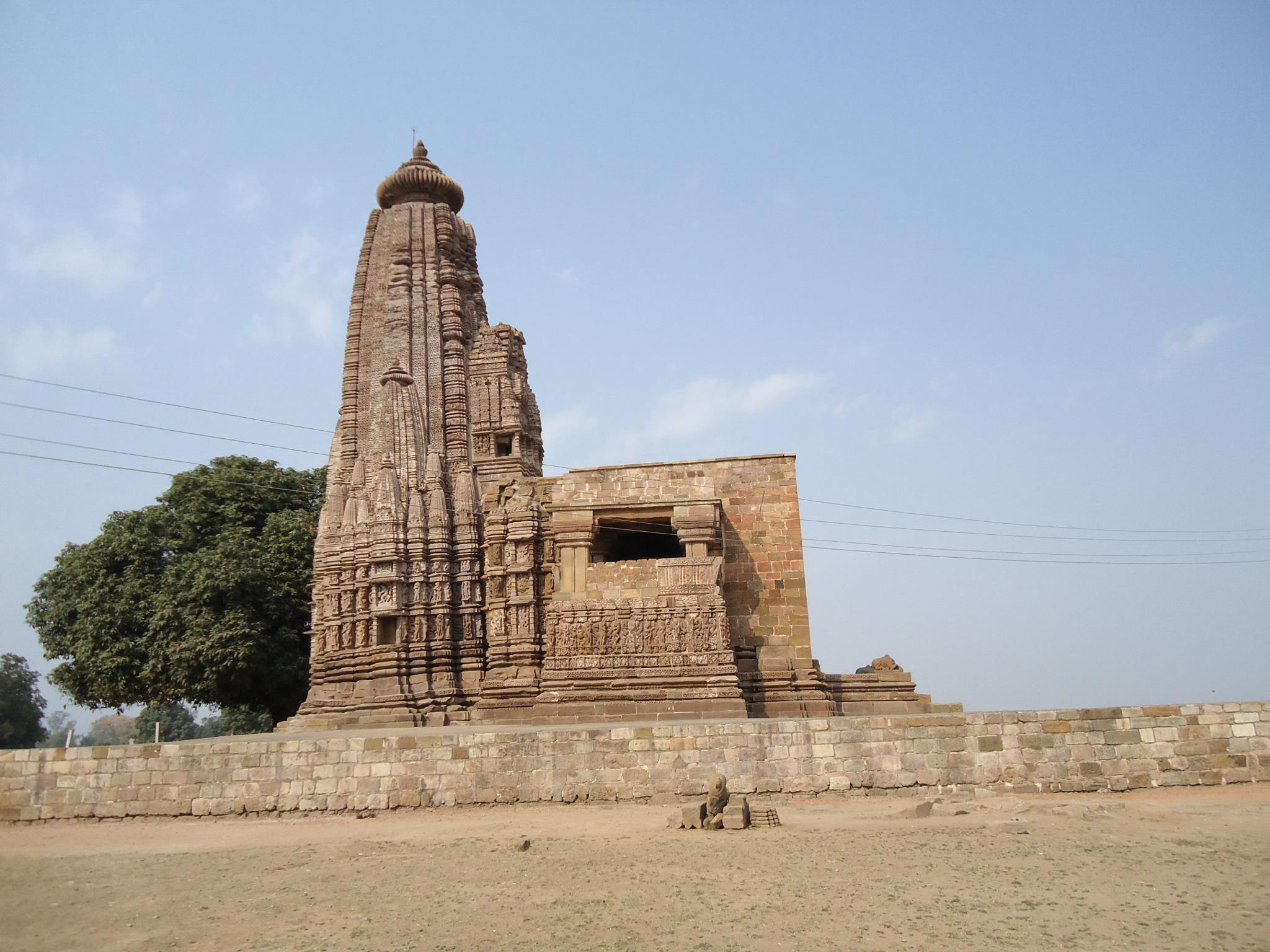
Virateshwar Temple. ASI number N-MP-255

Virateshwar temple is a Shiv mandir that has an old statue of Lord Shiva.

== Transport ==
Shahdol is accessible via the Indian highway and rail networks, with regular bus service connecting it to Indore (via Katni), Sagar, and Bhopal.

The nearest airport is 143 km away in Jabalpur.
