= Sohagpur Coalfield =

Biggest coalfield of Madhya Pradesh, India

- Location in Madhya Pradesh
- Location: Madhya Pradesh, India; 23°14′N 81°30′E
- Company: South Eastern Coalfields Limited
- Website: http://secl.gov.in/
- Acquired: 1985

Sohagpur Coalfield is located in Shahdol district in the Indian state of Madhya Pradesh in the basin of the Son River. It is the biggest coalfield in the state of Madhya Pradesh.

== History ==
Coal was discovered in this region, first in Sohagpur Coalfield by a British geologist named Franklin in 1830. After the First World War, the first attempts at coal mining failed, but around 1926 Burhar and Dhanpuri collieries were started. The Anuppur-Chirimiri line was opened in 1939 and mining operations were extended subsequently. Sohagpur Coalfield is a remnant in the Son basin of Gondwana deposition.

== The coalfield ==
Sohagpur Coalfield is a part of Central India Coalfields. The latter is spread over the districts of Surguja, Koriya (both in Chhattisgarh), Shahdol and Umaria (both in Madhya Pradesh). There are fourteen coalfields in this group, namely Korar, Umaria, Johilla, Sohagpur, Sonhat, Jhilimili, Chirimiri, Sendurgarh, Koreagarh, Damhamunda, Panchbahini, Hasdeo-Arand, Lakhanpur and Bishrampur. The group covers an area of about 5,345 square kilometres (2,064 sq mi) with estimated reserves of 15,613.98 million tonnes. The deposits are at a depth of 0–1200 meters. Therefore, extraction is mainly amenable to underground mining except a few blocks in eastern part of these coalfields which have opencast potential.

Sohagpur Coalfield is spread over an area of about 3,100 square kilometres (1,200 sq mi) and has an estimated reserve of 4,064 million tonnes.

There are four coal seams, about 1–4 m in thickness spread across three sub-basins: Burhar-Amlai sub-basin located in the western part of the coalfield, Kotma sub-basin, located on the Anuppur-Chirimiri branch line, 40 miles east of Burhar and the Jhagrakhand-Bijuri sub-basin in the easternmost part of the coalfield. In general the coal is of low rank, high moisture, high volatiles and non-coking type.

Sohagpur Coalfield is divided in two parts by the east–west running Barmni-Chilpa fault. Coal found on the north of this fault is characteristically different from the coal occurring south of the fault. Coking coal has been found in the north of the fault.

Sharda Opencast Mine is being expanded from 0.50 million tonnes per annum to 0.85 million tonnes per annum and the mining area from 242.847 ha to 871.205 ha. Highwall mining has been introduced here. Normal open cast methods cannot be used as it is uneconomical to develop the coal seam by such methods in a small, confined area. By using this successful technology for the first time in India, the abandoned Sharda opencast mine has been a landmark in the Indian mining industry.

== Coalbed Methane ==
Sohagpur Coalfield has ample scope of Coalbed methane exploration.
