= Ram Chandra Maheshwari =

Indian politician

Ram Chandra Maheshwari was an Indian politician from state of Madhya Pradesh. He was an M.L.A to Madhya Pradesh Legislative Assembly. Subsequently, he was elected as Deputy Speaker of Madhya Pradesh Legislative Assembly, died in 2005.
