= Beohari =

- Nagar Parishad
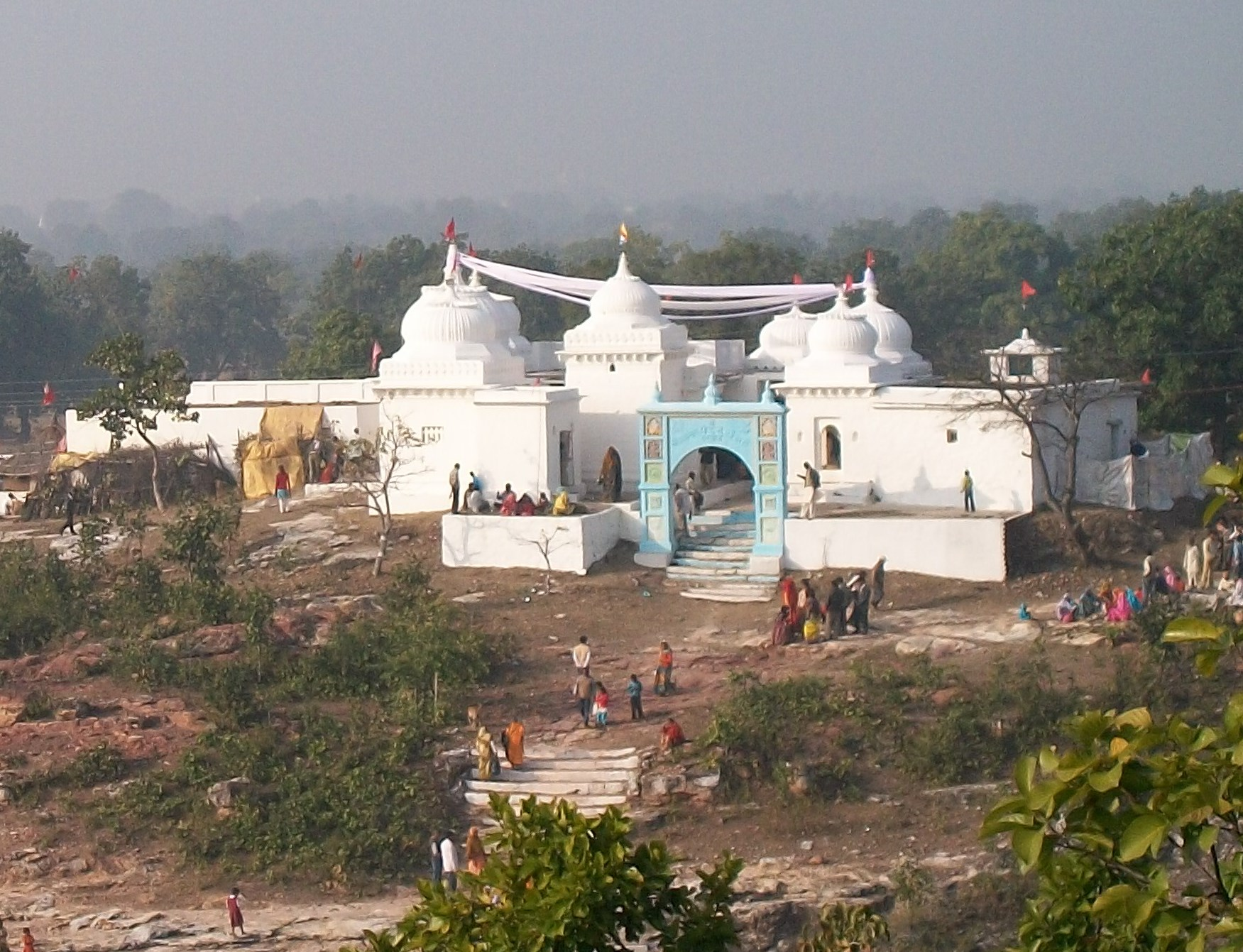
- Shiv Temple Beohari

- Location in Madhya Pradesh, India Beohari (India)
- Coordinates: 24.05°N 81.38°E
- Country: India
- State: Madhya Pradesh
- District: Shahdol
- Named for: Behaviour
- Elevation: 338 m (1,109 ft)

Population (2011)
  - Total: 33,700

Languages
  - Official: Hindi, Bagheli, English
- Time zone: UTC+5:30 (IST)
- Postal code: #484774
- code: 07650
- Vehicle registration: 1. MP 18

Beohari is a major town and a nagar panchayat in Shahdol district in the state of Madhya Pradesh, India. It is 79.07 kilometres (49.13 mi) from the main district of Shahdol and 412 kilometres (256 mi) away from Bhopal, the state capital. Its geographical coordinates are 24° 3' 0" North, 81° 23' 0" East.

Beohari is rich in mineral resources, including marble, iron ore, clay, sand and unexplored petroleum products. Beohari is economically rich and is politically active since Independence.

== History ==
The name "Beohari" stems from the title-prefix "Beohar", which signifies that the town was founded by a member of the Beohar dynasty. The Beohars were Rani Durgavati's prime ministers and knight-commanders, and Jagirdars of Jabalpur and their descendants continue to live there. The most notable of the Beohars is Sardar-Beohar Adhar Simha, who represented the Gond kingdom in Emperor Akbar's court, and the last Jagirdar of Jabalpur was Beohar Raghuvir Sinha. Different members of the Beohar lineage founded different settlements called Beohari, which are scattered in the Mahakoshal region of Madhya Pradesh.

== Geography ==
Beohari is located at 24.05°N 81.38°E. It has an average elevation of 338 metres (1,108 feet).

== Demographics ==
As of 2001 the India census, Beohari had a population of 20,013. Males constituted 53% of the population and females 47%. Beohari has an average literacy rate of 64%, higher than the national average of 59.5%; with 60% of the males and 40% of females literate. 15% of the population is under nine years of age.

== Notable people ==
Ram Kishore Shukla was a political and ideological leader of the region during the Indian independence movement and for more than half of a century (1951–2003). He represented Beohari as an M.L.A for seven terms.

Kunwar Lavkesh Singh was the Bhartiya Janta Party M.L.A from 1990 to 2008. He was also Parliamentary Secretary, State Minister and State Minister With Independent Charge.

== Agriculture ==
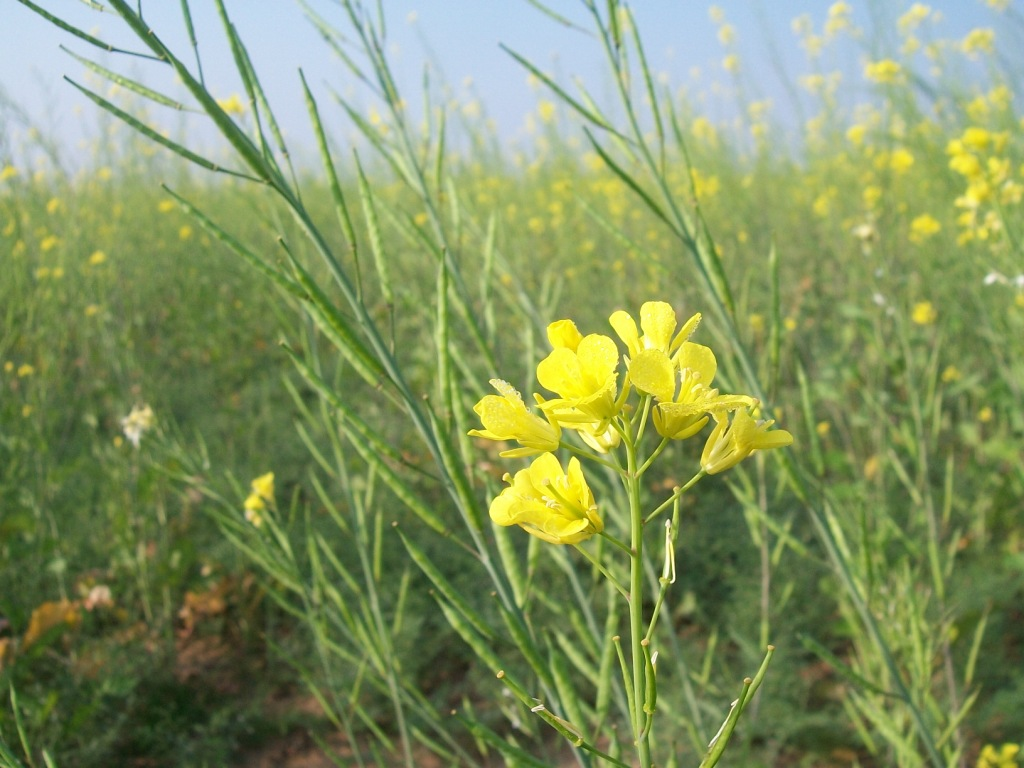
A Mustard Field in Akhetpur, Beohari.

Agriculture is the chief economic occupation in Beohari. In recent years, mustard farming has become one of the most harvested crop in Beohari due to balanced temperatures and the soil, which is loose, friable and deep.

The main crops are paddy; cereals like maize, sorghum, kodo-kutki and other small millets; pulses like tuar and udhad; and oil seeds like til, groundnut, soya-bean and sunflower.

Most of the region's population is dependent on agriculture. Mainly the tribals are marginal farmers who prefer the cultivation in the old traditional method.

Being a mountainous area, only 9% of the total crop gets irrigation. The area irrigated by canals, tubewells, dugwells and tanks. Some part of the place are in the shore of the Banas River and Jhapar River. In this area was mainly production of wheat and rice in India. In Beohari the highest number of growing wheat. A dam was built in this area in 2001.

=== Forestry ===
Sal, amla, teak, sarai and shisham are the main trees found in this area. The flowera of mahua and guli provide edible oil.

== Education ==
Beohari town has an Arts and Commerce college named after Ram Kishore Shukla. About 95% of the local villages have primary schools. The region has 219 primary schools, 68 junior High schools, 13 High schools and 20 Higher secondary schools.

== Connectivity ==
=== Road transport ===
Beohari is connected by road to Rewa, Satna, Shahdol, Sidhi and Umaria.Bus services are available from Katni to Beohari via Manpur. The bus journey from Shahdol and rewa will take around 2 to 3 hours and from katni it will take around 5 to 6 hours.

=== Railways ===
There are direct connections to major cities. Beohari is an important station on the Katni to Howrah route, which is 112 km from Katni and 149 km apart from Singrauli. Major services are:

- Shaktipunj Express
- Jabalpur - Singrauli InterCity Express
- Katni Chopan Mix Passenger
- Bhopal - Howrah Express.
- Ajmer - Kolkata Express.
- Katni Chopan Fast Passenger.
- Singrauli Bhopal SF Express.
- Singrauli Hazrat Nizamuddin SF Express.

=== Air transport ===
Beohari is well-connected with Jabalpur Airport. Daily trains and buses are available. The nearest airport to Beohari is Jabalpur. One can take flights from Delhi for Jabalpur and use the connecting bus or train service directly from Jabalpur (Shaktipunj Express. Flights available for Jabalpur are on Air India, IndiGo and Alliance Air airlines.

== Gallery ==
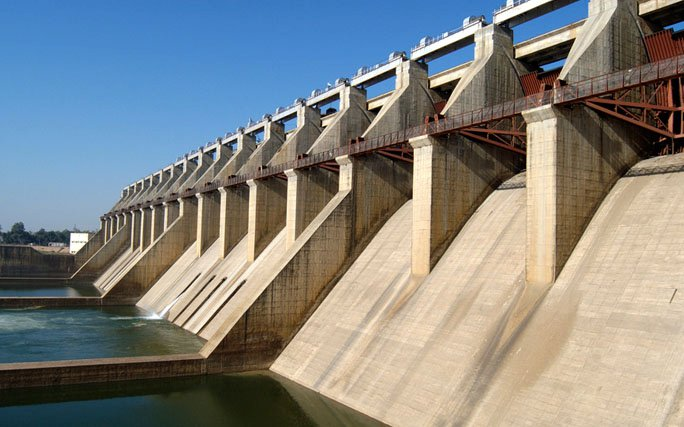
Bansagar Dam

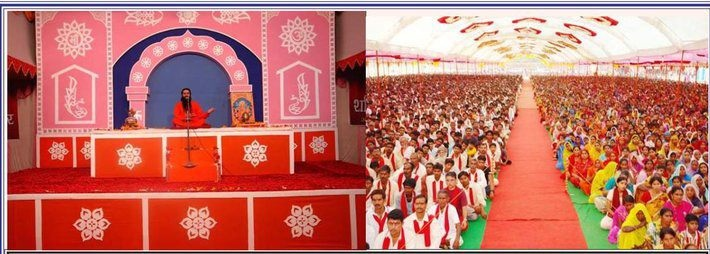
Panch Jyoti Shaktitirth Siddhashram

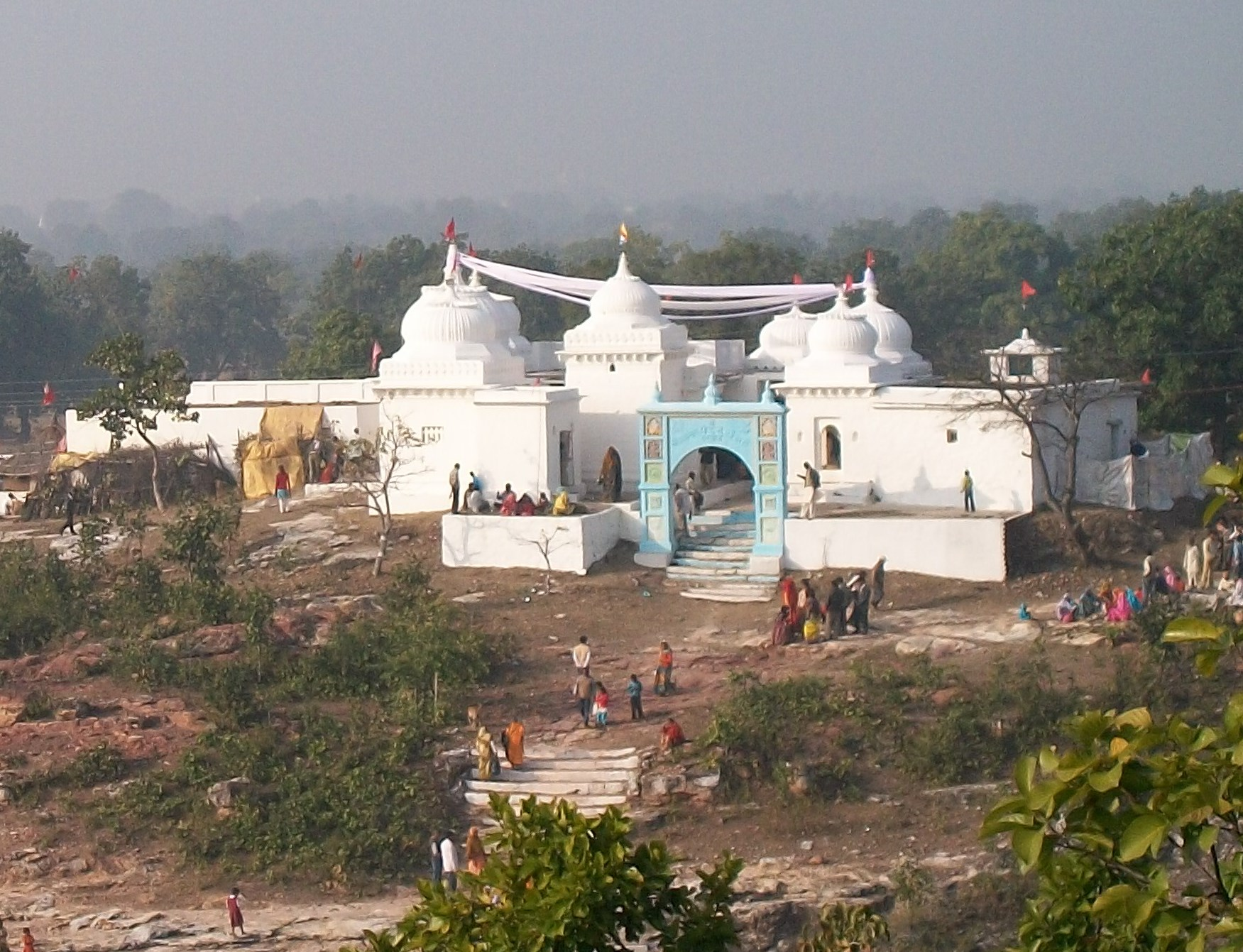
Lord Shiv Temple Godaval

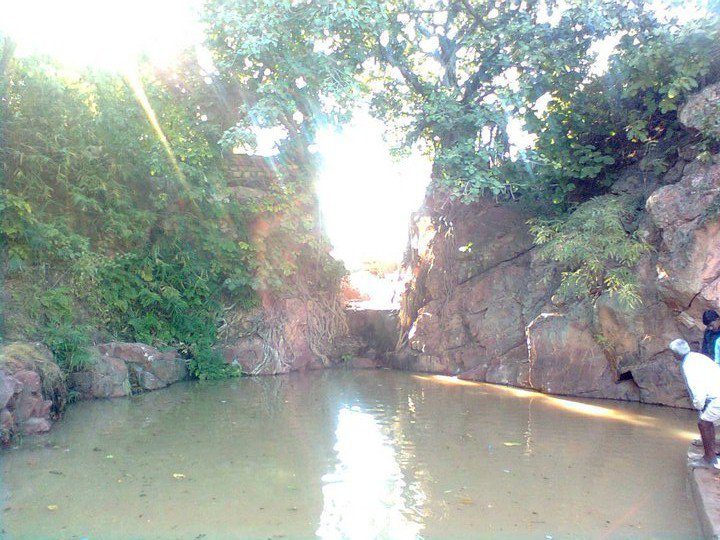
Hira Kund Godaval

== See also ==
- Beohari Vidhan Sabha constituency
