= Burhar =

Dhanpuri-Burhar-Amlai
- town
- Location in Madhya Pradesh, India Dhanpuri-Burhar-Amlai (India)
- Coordinates: 23.22°N 81.53°E
- Country: India
- State: Madhya Pradesh
- District: Shahdol

Government
  - Type: Democracy
  - Body: Bhartiya Janta Party
  - Mayor: Kailash Vishnani
- Elevation: 482 m (1,581 ft)

Population (2011)
  - Total: 19,289

Languages
  - Official: Hindi
- Time zone: UTC+5:30 (IST)
- PIN: 484110 vehicle_code_range =
- ISO 3166 code: IN-MP
- Vehicle registration: MP-18

Burhar is a town and nagar panchayat in Shahdol district in the state of Madhya Pradesh, India. Burhar was named after Budhi Mata, a local deity. It also has a temple belonging to her, in Purani Basti. Burhar is one of the fastest emerging commercial hubs of the division due to its geographical location.

== Demographics ==
As of the 2011 Census of India, Burhar had a population of 19,289 of which 10,020 were male and 9,269 female, giving a sex ratio of 925. There were 2307 children aged 0–6 = 11.96% of the city population. The literacy rate was 83.7% - male 89.12% and female 77.92% - significantly higher than the state average of 69.32%.

== Geography ==
Burhar in Shahdol district is located approximate 80 km far from Amarkantak, a hill station. It also serves as a connection to prominent cities like Jabalpur, Rewa and Katni. There is a square at Burhar called Jaitpur Chauraha.

== Economy ==
Burhar is situated in between many small villages, coal mines, power hubs and industries. Rich coal mines are situated nearby. Reliance Petroleum has a gas mine of coal bed methane gas near Burhar under RIL CBM project. Orient Paper Mills and Hukamchand Jute Mill are located near Budhar which gives it economic strength.

== Surroundings and culture ==
A road called Jaitpur Chauraha leads to Jaitpur. There are many villages between Burhar and Jaitpur, principally Channudi, Bahgarh and Bhatiya. There is a temple at Bhatiya before Jaitpur which is known across the districts nearby. Devotees from all over the place gather at Bhatiya Temple, Birla mandir, Jaula Mukhi to celebrate the Hindu festivals such as Ramnavmi, Navratri, and many more.

== Colleges and schools ==
Burhar is known for its schools, a degree college, and computer institutions. Government Nehru Degree college, affiliated to Awadesh Pratap Singh University Rewa, provides courses.

The principal schools are:

- Govt Excellence Higher Secondary School Burhar
- Govt. Girls Higher Secondary School Burhar
- Govt. Kaptan School
- Govt Middle School Burhar
- Saraswati Shishu Vidya Mandir Burhar
- Nehru Degree College Burhar
- DAV Burhar Public School
- Carmel Convent Higher Secondary School Amlai
- Kendriya Vidyalaya Dhanpuri
- Gyan Niketan English Med. Higher Secondary School
- Bal Vikash Higher Secondary School
