= Shahdol =

- City
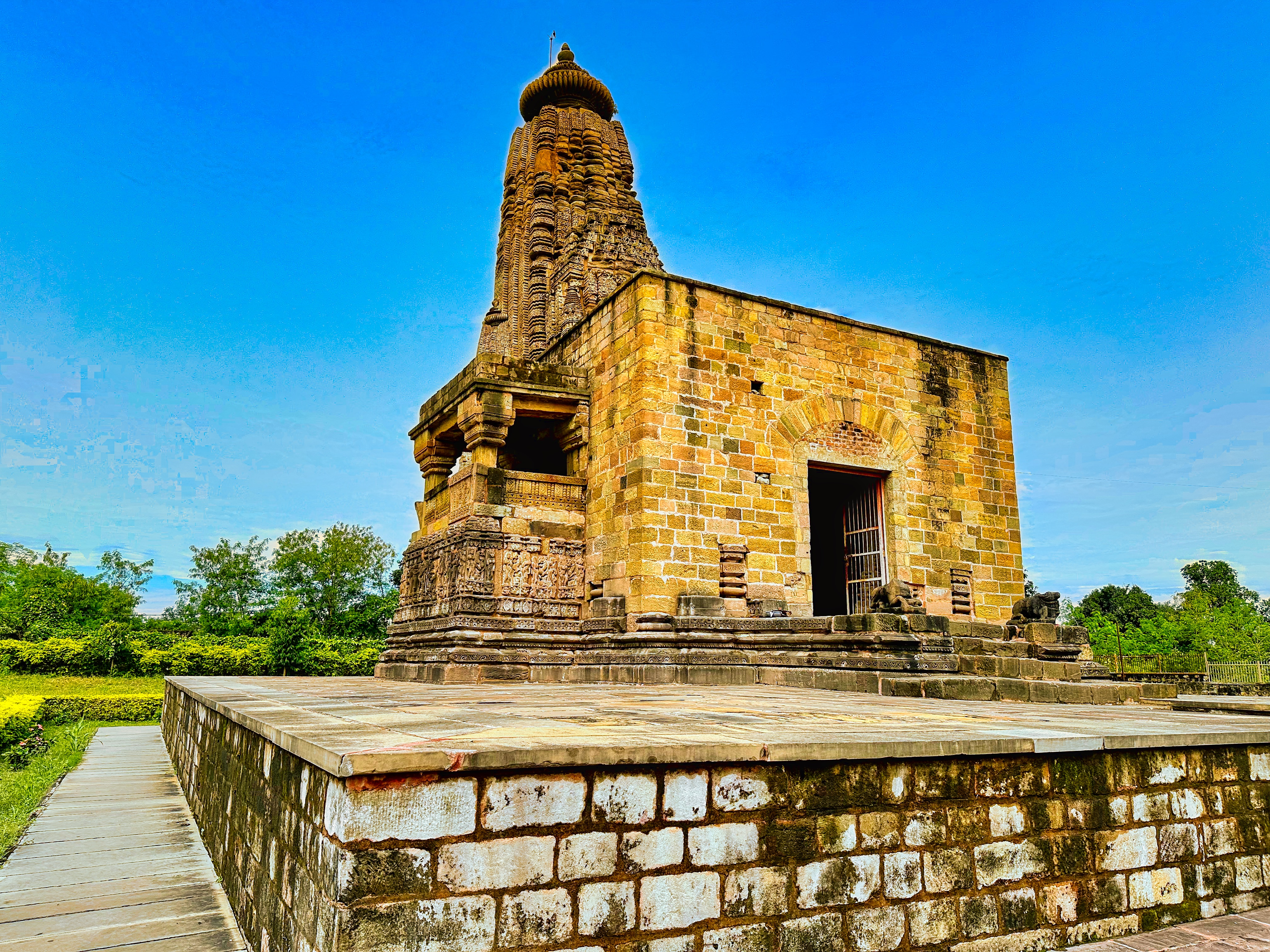
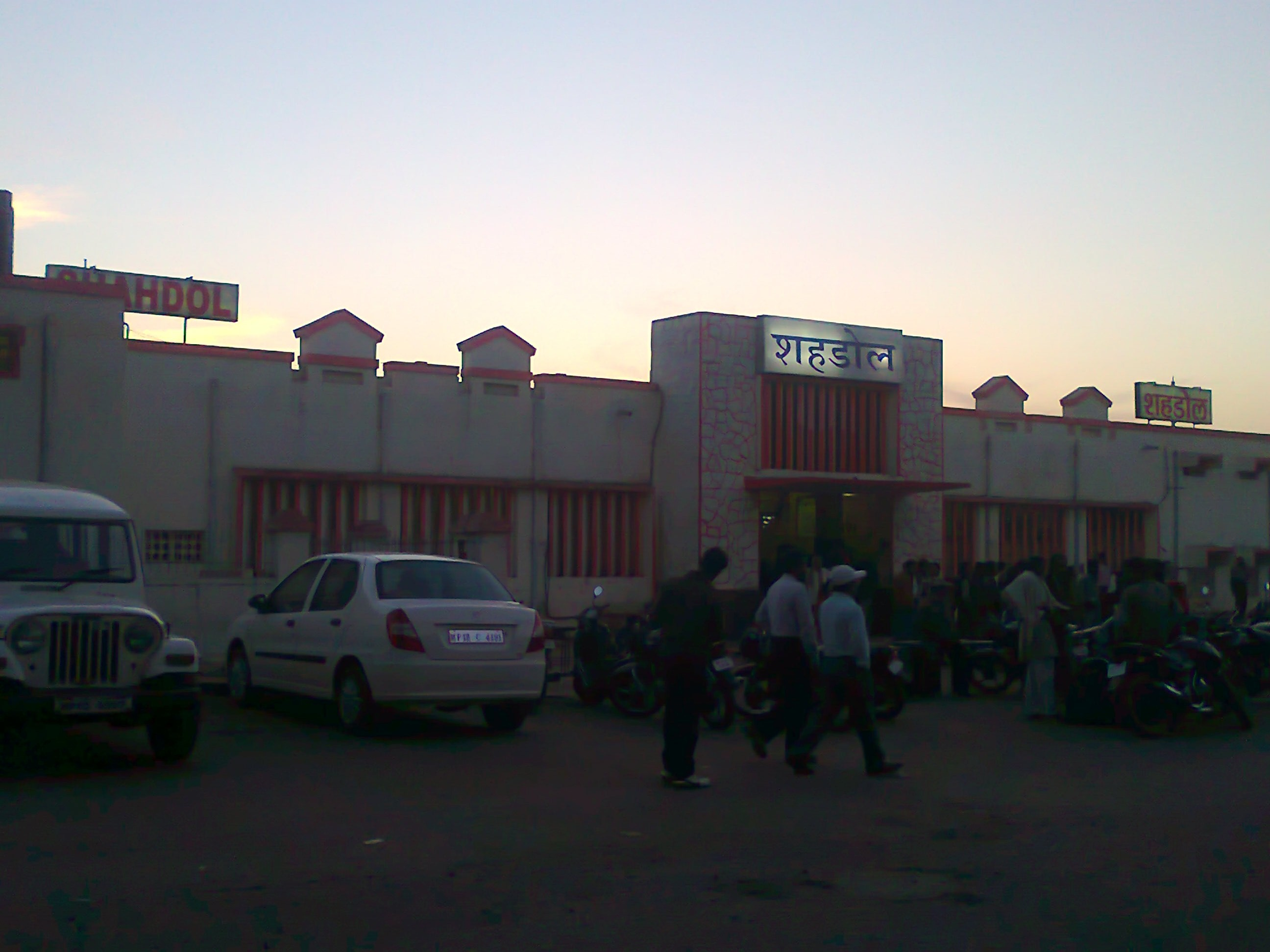
- Virat Mandir; Shahdol Railway Station

- Location in Madhya Pradesh, India Shahdol (India)
- Coordinates: 23.28°N 81.35°E
- Country: India
- State: Madhya Pradesh
- District: Shahdol

Government
  - Type: Municipal Council
  - Body: Municipality
- Elevation: 464 m (1,522 ft)

Population (2011)
  - Total: 86,681
- Time zone: UTC+5:30 (IST)
- PIN: 484001
- Telephone code: 07652
- ISO 3166 code: IN-MP
- Vehicle registration: MP-18
- Website: shahdol.nic.in

Shahdol is a City in Shahdol district in the Indian state of Madhya Pradesh. It is the administrative headquarters of Shahdol district, The total geographical area of the district is 5,671 square kilometres (2,190 mi^{2}).

== Geography ==
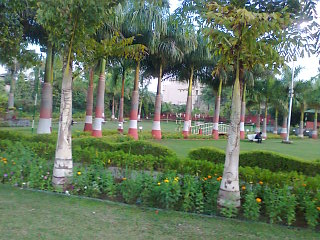
Manas Park Shahdol

Shahdol is Located on 23.28°N 81.35°E. It has an average elevation of 508 metres (1669 feet). It is surrounded by mountains on all sides and covered with dense forests.

== Climate ==
Shahdol has humid subtropical climate (Köppen climate classification Cwa) with hot summers, a somewhat cooler monsoon season and cool winters. Very heavy rainfalls in the monsoon season from June to September.

== Demographics ==
As of 2011 India census, Shahdol had a population of 86,681. 44,637 are males while 42,044 are females. Population of Children with age of 0-6 is 9093 which is 10.49% of total population of Shahdol. In Shahdol Municipality, Female Sex Ratio is of 942.

Religion in Shahdol
Religion	Percent
Hindus	84.90%
Muslims	12.45%
Jains	0.67%
Christians	1.11%

== Education ==
Education institutes in Shahdol include:

- Pt. Shambhu Nath Shukla University, Shahdol
- Birsa Munda Medical College, Shahdol
- University Institute of Technology RGPV, Shahdol
- Industrial Training Institute, Shahdol
- Government Polytechnic College, Shahdol

== Economy ==
=== Agriculture ===
The size of the fields are very small and mainly the tribals are marginal farmers. The yearly yield of the products from the fields are not enough for their home use. Hence, for the rest part of the year they work on daily wages. Mahua fruit, wood & seeds are source of income for tribe area people.

=== Minerals ===
District Shahdol is very rich in its mineral resources. Minerals found in district are coal, fire clay, ochers and marble. Sohagpur Coalfield contributes a major part in the revenue of the state. District Shahdol is only uranium producer in state.

=== Industry ===
Orient Paper Mills is a paper and paper crafts manufacturer in Amlai (Madhya Pradesh), India. It has been associated with paper manufacture in Africa.

The current source of gas is Coal Bed Methane (CBM) blocks in Sohagpur East (SP-E) and Sohagpur West (SP-W) located in Shahdol. RIL has been awarded by the Government of India the Coal Bed Methane (CBM) blocks, located in the districts of Shahdol and Annupur in the state of Madhya Pradesh.

== Culture/Cityscape ==
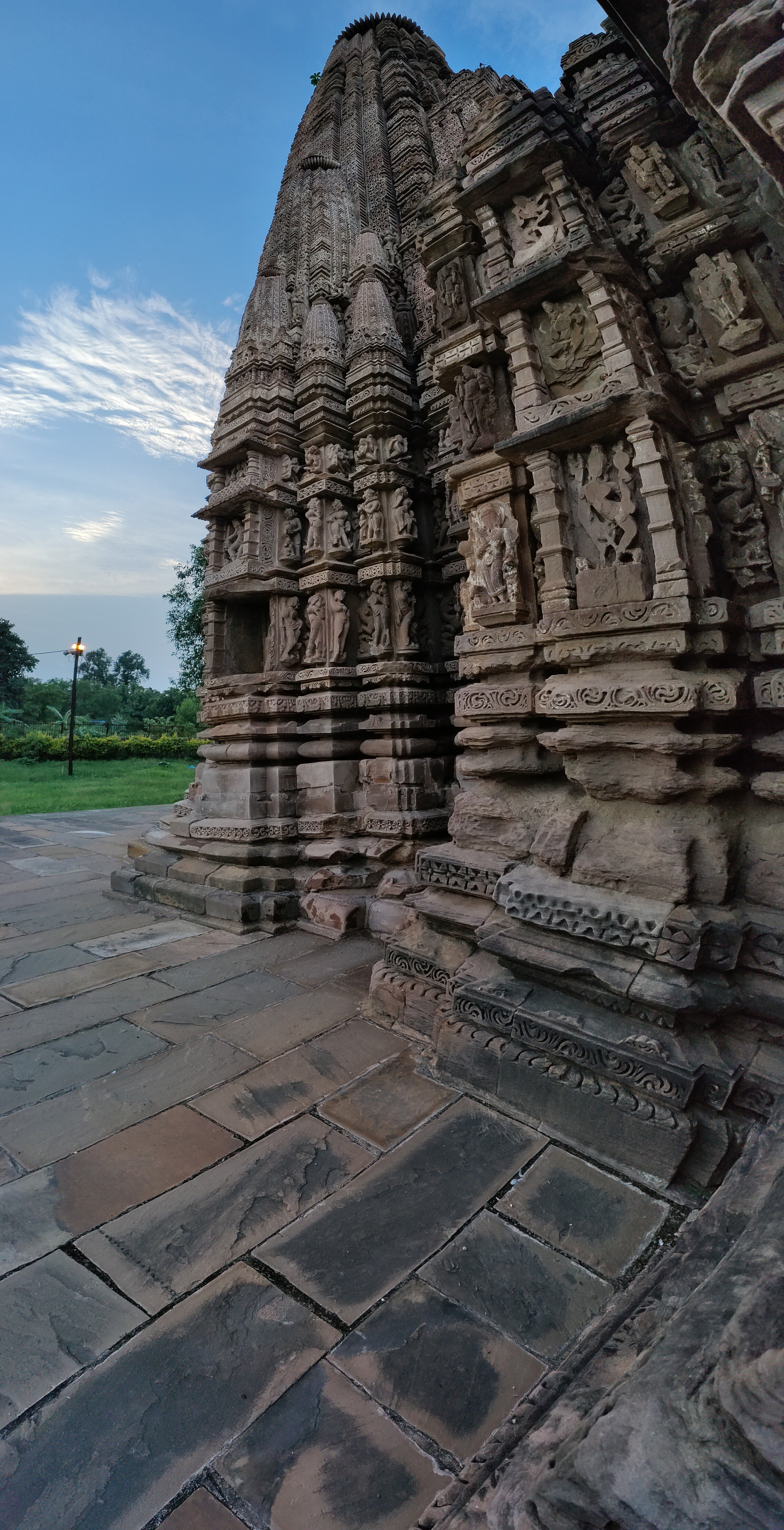
Virat Mandir

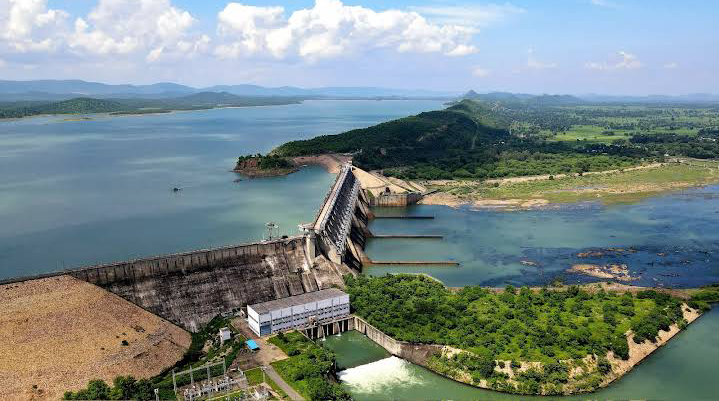
Bansagar Reservoir

- Virateshwar temple, it's a Historical and Religios place in Shahdol.
- Bansagar Dam, Bansagar Reservoir is located on Son River, it's a Beautiful Place.
- Sirsi Island, Sirsi Island is a resort situated on the island in the middle of Bansagar Dam in Shahdol district, which has been developed by MP Tourism.

== Transportation ==
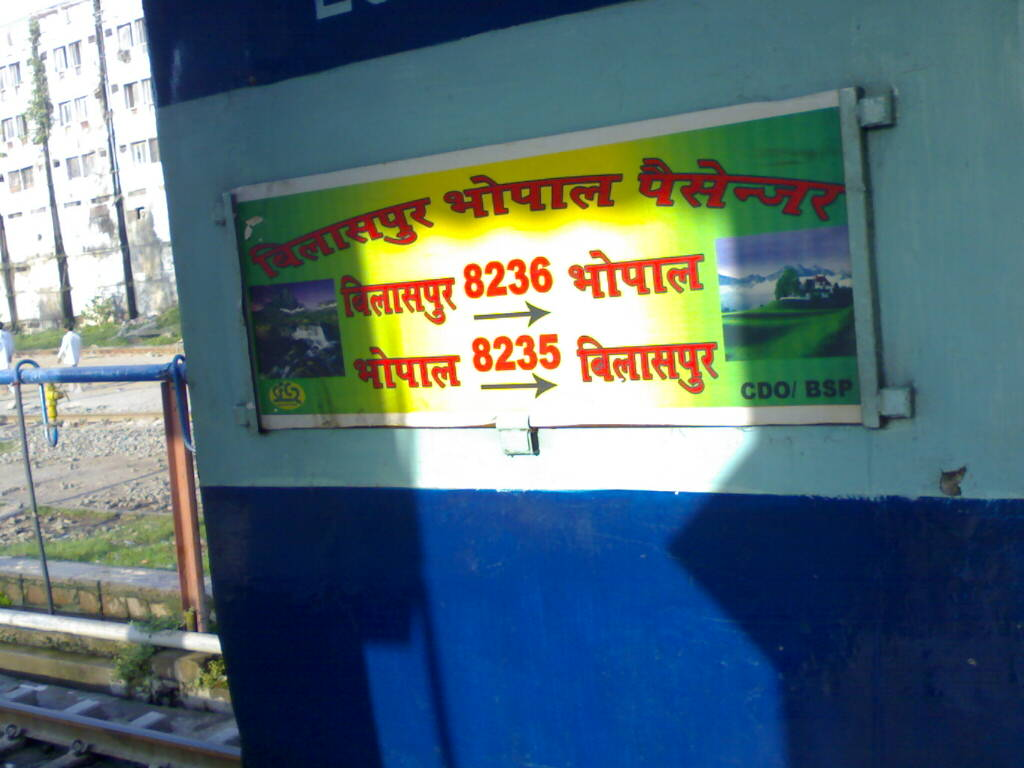
Bhopal Bilaspur Express Arrived at Shahdol Station

Shahdol railway station is located on Katni-Bilaspur line. It's connected major city of India. Many trains halting in Shahdol. Many trains Originate from Shahdol Like :

- Shahdol Nagpur Express
- Shahdol Bilaspur Express
- Shahdol Ambikapur Express

Nearby Airport is Jabalpur Airport.
