= Shahdol district =

Coordinates: 23°18′N 81°21′E

- District of Madhya Pradesh
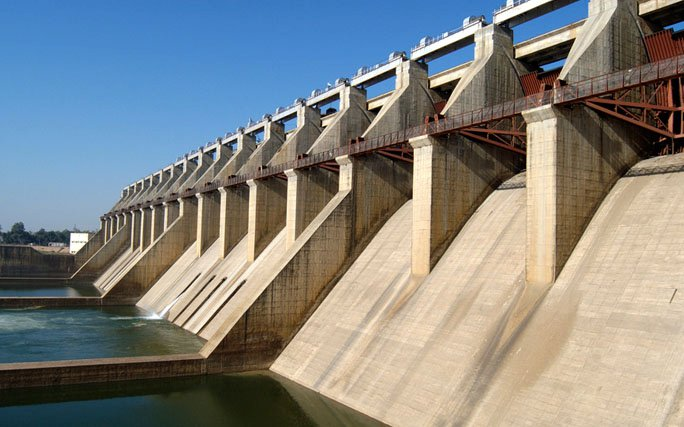
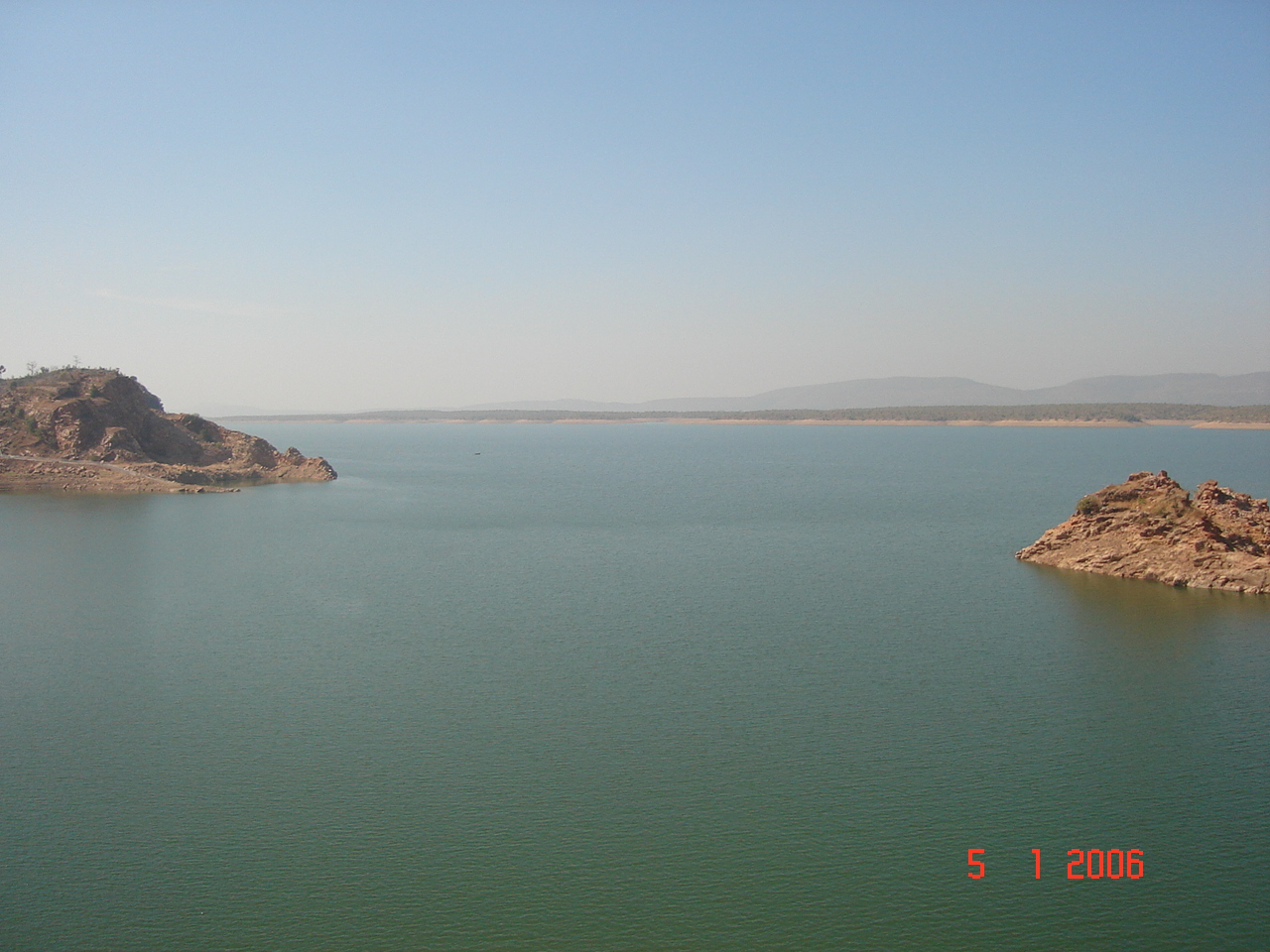
- View of Bansagar Dam

- Location of Shahdol district in Madhya Pradesh
- Country: India
- State: Madhya Pradesh
- Division: Shahdol
- Headquarters: Shahdol

Government
  - Deputy Commissioner: Satendra Singh, IAS

Area
  - Total: 6,205 km^{2} (2,396 sq mi)

Population (2011)
  - Total: 1,066,068
  - Density: 171.8/km^{2} (445.0/sq mi)

Demographics
  - Literacy: 66.7 per cent
  - Sex ratio: 974
- Time zone: UTC+05:30 (IST)
- Website: shahdol.nic.in

Shahdol district (Hindi pronunciation: [ʃɛʱ.ɖoːl]) is a district of Madhya Pradesh state in east central India. Its old name was Matsya raj or Virat kingdom in the name of great king Maharaja Virata. With a total area of 6,205 km^{2} (2,396 sq mi) and a population of 10,66,063. Shahdol is an important district of Madhya Pradesh. The town of Shahdol is the district headquarters. The district formerly comprised Shahdol division.

The Virateshwara Temple in Sohagpur Vangana is the most important tourist destination of Shahdol and a structural masterpiece. The district extends 110 km (68 mi) from east to west and 170 km (110 mi) from north to south.

== History ==
Shahdol history is from the Mahabharata era and Shahdol stands for shahh means 100 and Dol means pond. City of 100 ponds which were dug during Agyatwaas of Pandavas who were continuously on move while exile last year to avoid being traced by spies sent by Duryodhana. It was part of Virata Nagar where Pandavas spent most of last year of exile. Later the City regained books during Gupt period. The district was ruled by the Chedis and Kalachuris, before being taken by the Gonds. Baghels were allies of Mughal rulers after being defeated from Gujrat by Khilji took refuge in Rewa. They slowly captured most of the district after establishing Rewa as capital city from Gondwana kings. The town Sohagpur was established by the Baghel king Sohag Deo in Shahdol. Eventually the Bhonsles of Nagpur took over the territory, and after the Second Anglo-Maratha War it was ceded to the British. After the Maharaja of Rewa supported the Britishers during the 1857 rebellion, the district was returned to him in gratitude. Shahdol was at this time sparsely settled, and the Baghels invited many cultivators into the district from other parts. It remained an estate of Rewa state under the until Independence, when it became a separate district.

== Geography ==
Shahdol District is situated in the north-eastern part of the Madhya Pradesh province of India. Because of the division of the district on 15-08-2003, the area of the district remains 5,671 km^{2} (2,190 sq mi). It is surrounded by Anuppur in the southeast, Satna & Rewa in the north, Sidhi in the northeast, Umaria in the west and Koriya district of Chhattisgarh in the west. The district extends 110 km from east to west and 170 km from north to south. This district is situated between 22°38' N latitude to 24°20' N latitude and 80°28' E Longitude to 82°12' E longitude.

== Topography ==
The District is located in the north-eastern part of the Deccan Plateau. It lies at the trijunction of Maikal Ranges of the Satpura Range, the foot of the Kaimore Range an extension of the Vindhya Range and a mass of parallel hills which extend over the Chhota Nagpur plateau in Jharkhand. In between these hill ranges lies the narrow valley of the Son and its tributaries. Since the Kaimore Range extends along the Son just across the northern boundary, the District may be divided into three physiographic divisions. They are :-

- The Maikal Range
- The Hills of Eastern Plateau
- The Upper Son Valley

District Shahdol is predominantly hilly district. It is picturesque with certain pockets and belt of SAL and mixed forests. Total geographical area of the district is 5671 km^{2}. Adjacents to the District Shahdol are the boarding districts Satna, Sidhi, Umaria, Anuppur and Rewa.

== Administrative Divisions ==
- Jaisinghnagar
- Beohari
- Jaitpur
- Burhar
- Gohaparu
- Sohagpur

== Mineral resources ==
District Shahdol is very rich in its mineral resources. Minerals found in district are coal, fire clay, ochers and marble. Sohagpur Coalfield contributes a major part in the revenue of the state. A brief description of the various occurrences is given below :

The important coal field in the District is Sohagpur coal field. The Barakars in this area are about 3100 km^{2} Four coal seams have been recorded from the lower Barakars whereas a few thin seams are reported from Upper Barakars. The Lower Barakar coal of lower ash content and better quality as compared to that from Upper Barakars. In general the coal is of low rank, high moisture, high volatiles and non-coking type. A reserve of 4064 million tonnes has been estimated from this field.

Good black clay deposits occur near Jamuni and Hinota.

Ochers deposit in the Shahdol district is reported from pachdi.

Marble deposits are found near villages Pasgarhi, Bagdari and Paparedi. Details of the deposit to be under search in these areas.

District Shahdol is only uranium producer in state

The current source of gas is Coal Bed Methane (CBM) blocks in Sohagpur East (SP-E) and Sohagpur West (SP-W) located in Shahdol. RIL has been awarded by the Government of India the Coal Bed Methane (CBM) blocks, located in the districts of Shahdol and Annupur in the state of Madhya Pradesh. The plateau production of CBM from these blocks is expected to be about 3.5 mmscmd. Total reserves estimated at 3.75 trillion cubic feet of in-place gas reserves under coal seams in Sohagpur coal bed methane (CBM) blocks

== Economy ==
In 2006 the Ministry of Panchayati Raj named Shahdol one of the country's 250 most backward districts (out of a total of 640). It is one of the 24 districts in Madhya Pradesh currently receiving funds from the Backward Regions Grant Fund Programme (BRGF).

=== Agriculture ===
District is very backward in the field of agriculture. Tribals of the district prefer the cultivation in the old traditional method. The size of the fields are very small and mainly the tribals are marginal farmers. The yearly yield of the products from the fields are not enough for their home use. Hence, for the rest part of the year they work on daily wages. Mahua fruit, wood & seeds are source of income for tribe area people.

== Demographics ==
Historical population
Year	Pop.	±% p.a.
1901	184,279	—
1911	210,750	+1.35%
1921	195,760	−0.74%
1931	235,883	+1.88%
1941	269,448	+1.34%
1951	294,797	+0.90%
1961	378,636	+2.53%
1971	476,735	+2.33%
1981	607,061	+2.45%
1991	766,980	+2.37%
2001	908,148	+1.70%
2011	1,066,063	+1.62%

According to the 2011 census Shahdol District has a population of 1,066,063, roughly equal to the nation of Cyprus or the US state of Rhode Island. This gives it a ranking of 427th in India (out of a total of 640). The district has a population density of 172 inhabitants per square kilometre (450/sq mi). Its population growth rate over the decade 2001-2011 was 17.27%. Shahdol has a sex ratio of 968 females for every 1000 males, and a literacy rate of 68.36%. 20.60% of the population live in urban areas. Scheduled Castes and Scheduled Tribes make up 8.42% and 44.65% of the population respectively.

The Tribals have a simple lifestyle. Their houses are made of mud, bamboo sticks, paddy, straw and local tiles. Tribal men wear Dhoti, Bandi, Fatohi and headgear. Women wear Saree named "Kaansh" saree in the local dialect. The saree is usually of skin colour. Women love to wear colourful clothes and ornaments. They wear traditional jewelry made of bamboo, seeds and metals. Nowadays people have also taken a liking for Western wear. Almost half of the tribals are Gonds, 22% Kols, 20% are Baiga.

=== Religion ===
Religions in Shahdol district (2011)
Religion	Percent
Hinduism	93.53%
Islam	3.98%
Others (tribal religion)	1.82%
Other or not stated	0.67%

As of the 2011 census, 93.53% of the population were Hindus, 3.98% Muslims and 1.82% other religions (mainly traditional tribal religion).

=== Languages ===
Languages of Shahdol district (2011)
1. Hindi (94.9%)
2. Bagheli (3.40%)
3. Others (1.68%)

At the time of the 2011 Census of India, 94.92% of the population in the district spoke Hindi and 3.4% Bagheli as their first language.

Vernaculars spoken in Shahdol include Bagheli, which has a lexical similarity of 72-91% with Hindi (compared to 60% for German and English) and is spoken by about 7,800,000 people in Bagelkhand. Around 7,500 people still speak Gondi in the district.

== Tourist attractions ==
=== Virateshwara Temple, Banganga ===
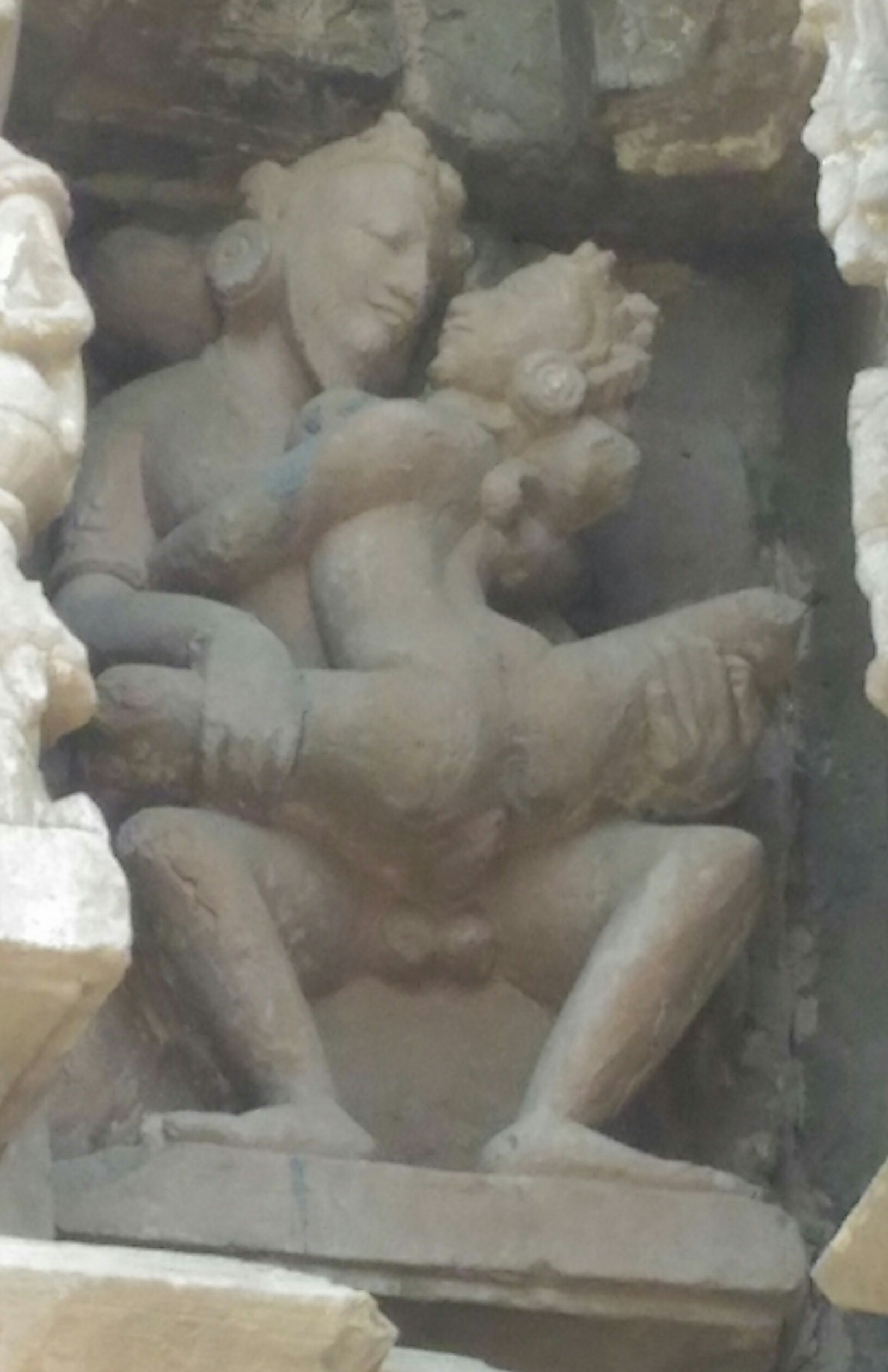
Erotic sculpture at Virateshwar temple, Shahdol

Virateshwar temple or Virat Temple, dating back to the 10th - 11th century CE, is a temple of Lord Shiva in Sohagpur (Shahdol), Shahdol district of Madhya Pradesh. This temple was built by the Kalchuri ruler, Maharaja Yuvraj between 950 A.D. and 1050 A.D. This was built as a present for the Acharya (saint) of Golkaki Math. Many archaeologists consider this temple as the temple of Karna Deva. This 70 feet tall temple is one of the most famous architectures of the Kalchuri Age. The temple is under the preservation of the Archaeological Survey of India (ASI).

=== Bansagar Dam ===
Bansagar or Ban Sagar Dam is a multipurpose river Valley project on Son River situated in the Ganges Basin in Madhya Pradesh, India with both irrigation and 435 MW of hydroelectric power generation .

=== Kankali Mandir ===
Kankali Mandir is located at village Antra. It's a divine temple of goddess Durga. Many people reach here in Navratri.

=== Jwalamukhi Temple ===
The Jwalamukhi Temple, located in Burhar, features an adjacent pond and serves as a major regional pilgrimage site, attracting thousands of visitors annually.

=== Lakhwariya caves ===
Regarding the caves of Lakhabaria, it is believed that the Pandavas had reached here during their exile in the Mahabharata period and had built one lakh caves. After which it was named Lakhbaria. At present about 13 caves are safe. All the rest are buried under the soil.

== Transport ==
The nearest airport is Jabalpur Airport.

Shahdol railway station is connected by rail route and roadways.

To reach by bus or taxi, one needs to travel on state highway 22.
