= Bhanwar Tonk =

Bhanwar Tonk is a forest hamlet nestled in the Achanakmar Amarkantak biosphere reserve area amongst the scenic Maikal Range, in Bilaspur district of Chhattisgarh, India.

Bhanwar Tonk railway station is situated in the Ghat Section of the Katni - Bilaspur rail line of SECR between Sarbahara railway station and Khongsara railway station. Due to steep gradient in slope in this section, many trains have technical as well as passenger halts in Bhanwar Tonk.
