= Ghutku railway station =

Railway station in Chhattisgarh

Ghutku

General information
- Location: Ghutku, Bilaspur district, Chattisgargh; India
- Coordinates: 22.16819°N 82.085321°E
- Elevation: 287 metres (942 ft)
- System: Indian Railways station
- Owner: Indian Railways
- Operator: South East Central Railway
- Line: Bilaspur–Katni line
- Platforms: 2
- Tracks: 2 (Double electrified BG)

Construction
- Structure type: Standard (on-ground station)

Other information
- Status: Functioning
- Station code: GTK
- Zone(s): South East Central Railway zone
- Division(s): Bilaspur

History
- Former names: Bengal Nagpur Railway

Services
Preceding station	Indian Railways	Following station
Kalmitar towards ?	South East Central Railway zone Bilaspur–Katni line	Uslapur towards ?
Location

Ghutku railway station is a railway station on Bilaspur–Katni line under Bilaspur railway division of South East Central Railway Zone of Indian Railways. The railway station is situated at Ghutku in Bilaspur district in the Indian state of Chattisgargh.

== History ==
Katni to Umaria railway line was constructed in 1886 as Katni–Umaria Provincial State Railway and in 1891 the line was extended to Bilaspur Junction by Bengal Nagpur Railway.
