= Chhulha railway station =

Railway station in Madhya Pradesh, India

Chhulha

General information
- Location: Amarkantak Road, Senduri, Kusmahai, Anuppur district, Madhya Pradesh; India
- Coordinates: 23.106724°N 81.73707°E
- Elevation: 489 metres (1,604 ft)
- System: Indian Railways station
- Owner: Indian Railways
- Operator: South East Central Railway
- Line: Bilaspur–Katni line
- Platforms: 3
- Tracks: 2 (Double electrified BG)

Construction
- Structure type: Standard (on-ground station)
- Parking: yes
- Cycle facilities: yes

Other information
- Status: Functioning
- Station code: CLF
- Zone(s): South East Central Railway zone
- Division(s): Bilaspur

History
- Former names: Bengal Nagpur Railway

Services
| Preceding station | Indian Railways | Following station |
|---|---|---|
| Anuppur Junction towards ? | South East Central Railway zone Bilaspur–Katni line | Jaithari towards ? |
Location

Chhulha railway station is a railway station on Bilaspur–Katni line under Bilaspur railway division of South East Central Railway Zone of Indian Railways. The railway station is situated beside Amarkantak Road at Senduri, Kusmahai in Anuppur district in the Indian state of Madhya Pradesh.

== History ==
Katni to Umaria railway line was constructed in 1886 as Katni–Umaria Provincial State Railway and in 1891 the line was extended to Bilaspur Junction by Bengal Nagpur Railway.
