= Anuppur tehsil =

Anuppur
- Tehsil
- Location in Madhya Pradesh Anuppur (India)
- Coordinates: 23.113655°N 81.697629°E
- Country: India
- State: Madhya Pradesh
- District: Anuppur district

Government
  - Type: Janpad Panchayat
  - Body: Council

Area
  - Total: 597.38 km^{2} (230.65 sq mi)

Population (2011)
  - Total: 305,877

Languages
  - Official: Hindi
- Time zone: UTC+5:30 (IST)
- Postal code (PIN): 484224
- Area code: 07659
- ISO 3166 code: MP-IN
- Vehicle registration: MP 65
- No. of Villages: 164
- Sex ratio: 961

Anuppur tehsil is a fourth-order administrative and revenue division, a subdivision of third-order administrative and revenue division of Anuppur district of Madhya Pradesh. It contains the town of Anuppur.

== Geography ==
Anuppur tehsil has an area of 597.38 sq kilometers. It is bounded by Shahdol district in the west, northwest and north, Kotma tehsil in the northeast, Chhattisgarh in the east and southeast, Jaithari tehsil in the south and Pushprajgarh tehsil in the southwest.

== See also ==
- Anuppur district
