= Pasan =

- Town
- Nickname: Jamuna and kotma area
- Location in Madhya Pradesh, India Pasan (India)
- Coordinates: 23°9′36″N 81°57′25″E
- Country: India
- State: Madhya Pradesh
- District: Anuppur

Population (2011)
  - Total: 28,447
- Time zone: UTC+5:30 (IST)
- Postal code: 484444
- ISO 3166 code: IN-MP
- Vehicle registration: MP

Pasan is a town and a municipality in Anuppur district in the Indian state of Madhya Pradesh. In pasan municipality area Maa durga mandir jamuna dham is a popular temple in Anuppur district

== Demographics ==
As of 2001 India census, Pasan had a population of 29,566. Males constitute 53% of the population and females 47%. Pasan has an average literacy rate of 65%, higher than the national average of 59.5%: male literacy is 74%, and female literacy is 55%. In Pasan, 14% of the population is under 6 years of age.
