= TGQ =

TGQ or tgq may refer to:

- TGQ, the station code for Tenganmada railway station, Chattisgargh, India
- TGQ, the IATA code for Tangará da Serra Airport, Brazil
- tgq, the ISO 639-3 code for Tring language, Sarawak, Malaysia
