= Kotma tehsil =

Kotma
- Tehsil
- Location in Madhya Pradesh Kotma (India)
- Coordinates: 23.207514°N 81.980753°E
- Country: India
- State: Madhya Pradesh
- District: Anuppur district

Government
  - Type: Janpad Panchayat
  - Body: Council

Area
  - Total: 305.08 km^{2} (117.79 sq mi)

Population (2011)
  - Total: 120,533

Languages
  - Official: Hindi
- Time zone: UTC+5:30 (IST)
- Postal code (PIN): 484334
- Area code: 07658
- ISO 3166 code: MP-IN
- Vehicle registration: MP 65
- No. of Villages: 69
- Sex ratio: 968

Kotma tehsil is a fourth-order administrative and revenue division, a subdivision of third-order administrative and revenue division of Anuppur district of Madhya Pradesh.

== Geography ==
Kotma tehsil has an area of 305.08 sq kilometers. It is bounded by Anuppur tehsil in the northwest, southwest and south, Chhattisgarh in the north, northeast, east and southeast and Shahdol district in the west.

== See also ==
- Anuppur district
