= Durg–Ambikapur Express =

Train in India

Overview
- Service type: Express
- Locale: Chhattisgarh & Madhya Pradesh
- Current operator: South East Central Railway

Route
- Termini: Durg (DURG); Ambikapur (ABKP)
- Stops: 30
- Distance travelled: 468 km (291 mi)
- Average journey time: 11 hrs 10 mins
- Service frequency: Daily. (Note: Runs daily for every direction.)
- Train number: 18241 / 18242

On-board services
- Class(es): AC First Class, AC 2 Tier, AC 3 Tier, Sleeper Class, General Unreserved
- Seating arrangements: No
- Sleeping arrangements: Yes
- Catering facilities: On-board catering, E-catering
- Observation facilities: Large windows
- Baggage facilities: No
- Other facilities: Below the seats

Technical
- Rolling stock: LHB coach
- Track gauge: 1,676 mm (5 ft 6 in)
- Operating speed: 43 km/h (27 mph) average including halts.
Route map
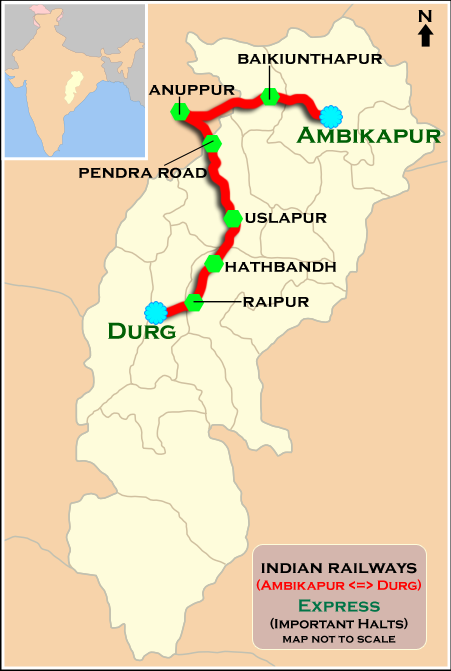

The 18241 / 18252 Durg–Ambikapur Express is an express train belonging to South East Central Railway zone that runs between Durg Junction and Ambikapur in India. It is currently being operated with 18241/18242 train numbers on a daily basis.

== Service ==
The 18241/Durg–Ambikapur Express has average speed of 42 km/h and covers 468 km in 11h 10m. The 18242/Ambikapur–Durg Express has an average speed of 40 km/h and covers 468 km in 11h 40m.

== Route and halts ==
The important halts of the train are:

- Durg Junction
- Bhilai Power House
- Raipur Junction
- Uslapur
- Pendra Road
- Anuppur Junction
- Kotma
- Bijuri
- Baikunthpur
- Surajpur
- Bishrampur
- Ambikapur

== Coach composition ==
The train has standard ICF rakes with a max speed of 110 kmph. The train consists of 23 coaches:

- 0.5 First AC
- 2.5 AC II Tier
- 4 AC III Tier
- 8 Sleeper coaches
- 6 General Unreserved
- 2 Seating cum Luggage Rake

== Traction ==
Both trains are hauled by a Bhilai Loco Shed-based WAP-7 electric locomotive from Durg to Ambikapur and vice versa.

== Rake sharing ==
The train shares its rake with 18755/18756 Shahdol–Ambikapur Express.

== Direction reversal ==
The train reverses its direction 1 times:

- Anuppur Junction

== See also ==
- Durg Junction railway station
- Ambikapur railway station
- Shahdol–Ambikapur Passenger
