= Achanakmar-Amarkantak Biosphere Reserve =

Biosphere reserves in India

- Interactive map of Achanakmar-Amarkantak Biosphere Reserve
- Location: Chhattisgarh, India; Madhya Pradesh, India
- Nearest city: Mungeli, Bilaspur
- Coordinates: 22°06′31″N 81°44′53″E
- Area: 383,551 ha (1,480.90 sq mi)
- Established: 2005

The Achanakmar-Amarkantak Biosphere Reserve is a biosphere reserve in India that extends across the states of Madhya Pradesh and Chhattisgarh, covering a total area of 383,551 hectares (3835.51 km^{2}).

== Location ==
The reserve is located in the northern part of Bio-Geographic zone 6 and Bio-Geographic province 6 A (Deccan peninsula and Central highlands). About 68.1% of this reserve lies in the Bilaspur district in Chhattisgarh. The other major portions of the reserve are in the Anuppur (16.20%) and Dindori (15.70%) districts of Madhya Pradesh. The protected area of the Achanakmar Wildlife Sanctuary is located in the Bilaspur district within the Biosphere Reserve.

== Geography ==
The Achanakmar Amarkantak Biosphere Reserve ID divided into core, buffer and transition zones Core zone of 551.55 km^{2} in Chhattishgarh and the Amarkantak Wildlife sanctuary is in core zone. The buffer zone and transition zone is of 3284.36 km^{2}. The buffer zone is spread across 2 states; an area of 1224.98 km^{2} lies in the Madhya Pradesh and the remaining area of 2059.38 km^{2} is in Chhattisgarh. The topography of the biosphere reserve varies from the lowland rice fields in Bilaspur and Anuppur and the wheat fields in Dindori to the hills of the Maikal range of Satpuras. The topography of the soil in the Amarkantak plateau is bauxite rocks. Several streams and Nallas flow through the reserve, many of which are not perennial. The area of the Achanakmar-Amarkantak Biosphere Reserve is considered to be one of the major watersheds of peninsular India. It separates the rivers that drain into the Arabian Sea and the Bay of Bengal. The reserve is also the source of three major river systems: the Narmada, the Johilla and the Son River. Maikal hill ranges together with Vindhya and Satpura lie within the Achanakmar-Amarkantak Biosphere Reserve.

== Climate ==
The typical monsoon climate of the reserve has three distinct seasons: Summer (March–June), Rainy (July–October), and Winter (November–February). The months of May and June are generally the hottest in the reserve, while the coolest months are December and January. The south-western monsoon brings rainfall to the area during the months of June to September.

== Flora ==
The natural vegetation in the Achanakmar-Bilaspur Biosphere Reserve varies across the reserve. The forest area of the reserve has tropical deciduous vegetation and it can be classified into Northern Tropical Moist Deciduous and Southern Dry Mixed Deciduous forests. The reserve is quite rich in plant diversity, having a combination of different climatic and edaphic conditions at various altitudes. The region provides shelter to various thallophyte, bryophyte, pteridophyte, gymnosperm, and angiosperm species. Almost 1500 plant species representing over 151 plant families can be found in the reserve. Several angiosperm species are found in the Achanakmar-Amarkantak Biosphere Reserve. Some of the important species include Thalictrum sp., Dillenia pentagyna, Cocculus hirsutus, Flacourtia indica, Talinium portulacifolium, Tamarix ericoides, Abelmoschus ficulneus, Hibiscus sabdariffa, Corchorus fascicularis, Grewia rothii, Biophytum sp., Oxalis sp., Tropaeolum majus, Gloriosa superba, Curcuma aromatica, Dioscore sp., Chlorophytum tuberosum, Curculigo orchioides, and Hypercum japonicum. Many planted gymnosperms have also been localized in the Amarkantak plateau and have adapted to the local environmental conditions of the area. Some of them are considered as endemic species; these include Cupressus torulosa, Thuja orientalis, Araucaria bidwillii, Pinus caribaea, Pinus elliottii, P. gregaii, P. kesiya, P. mountzumae, Pinus oocarpa, Pinus patula, Pinus ponderosa, Pinus pseudostrobus, Pinus roxburghii, Pinus serotina, Cedrus deodara, Juniperus sp., and Taxodium sp. Apart from these, more than 105 species of medicinal plants are found in the Achanakmar-Amarkantak Biosphere Reserve, of which 25 species are considered rare.

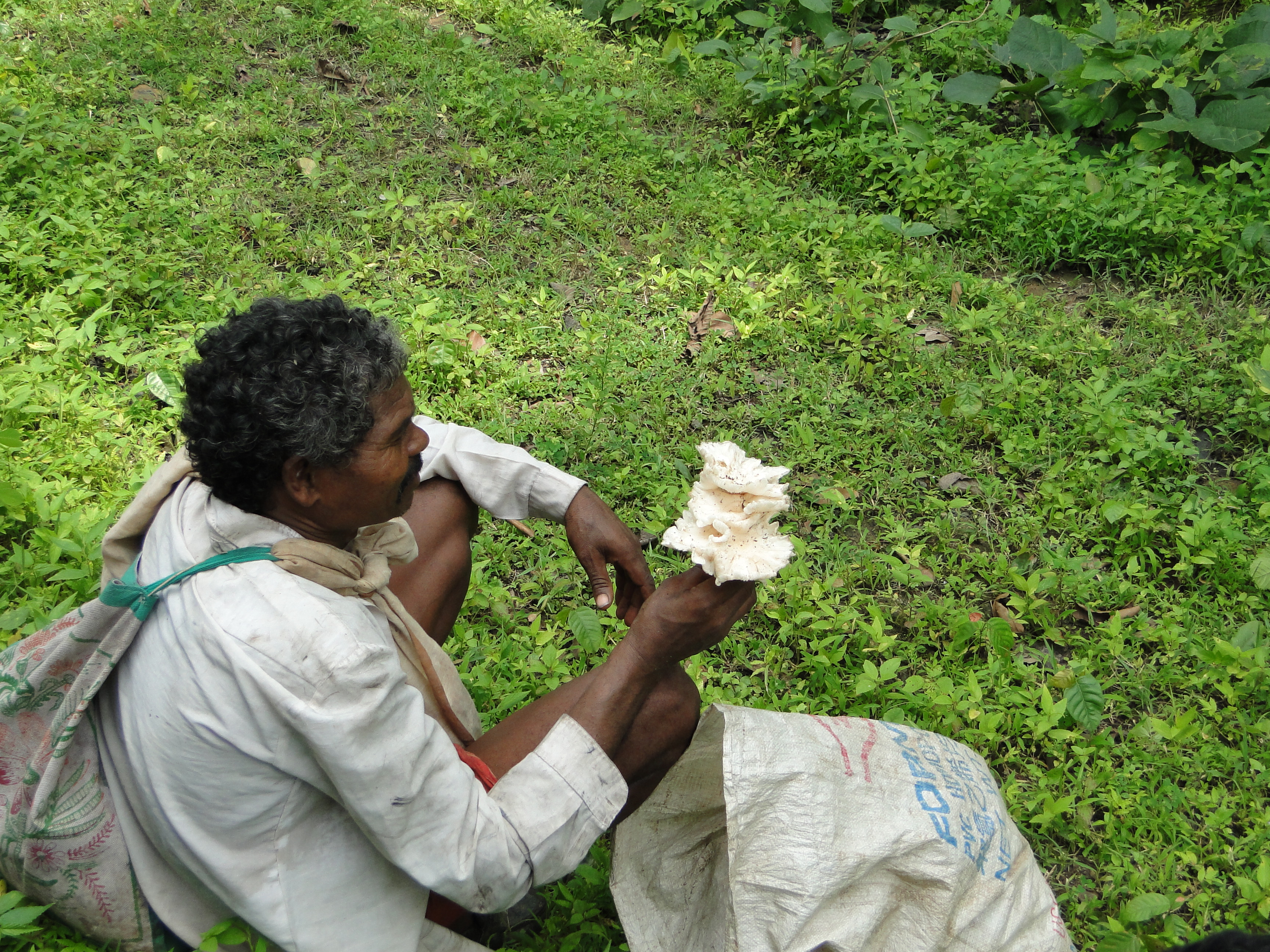
Illegal Wild Bamboo Mushroom Collection in Achanakmar-amarkantak biosphere reserve, India during rainy season.

== Fauna ==
The faunal composition of the Achanakmar-Amarkantak Biosphere Reserve is quite rich. More diverse and flourishing populations of wildlife can be found in the Achanakmar Sanctuary than in any other reserved forest area - including the Biosphere Reserve - due to better protection and improved habitat conditions within the sanctuary. According to the 2004 census, the Achanakmar Sanctuary is home to 26 tigers, 46 Indian leopard, 28 sloth bear, 1936 axis deer, 1369 sambar, 376 Indian muntjac and 552 gaur. Other important fauna species found in the reserve include the Indian blackbuck, chinkara, Indian wolves, Red fox, Golden jackal, Indian dhole, four-horned antelope, Eurasian wild boar, Indian hog deer and giant squirrels. Besides the rich variety of mammal fauna species, the reserve also provides natural habitat to 170 bird species belonging to 51 families. At least fifteen species of snakes and lizards, along with several species of frogs (cricket frog, burrowing frog, tree frog, ornate narrow-mouthed frog, toad, bullfrog, etc.) are found in the reserve as well. There are four variety of monkeys; Hanuman langur, Rhesus macaque, Gray langur and lion-tailed macaque.
