= Kelhauri (Chachai) =

- Census town
- Location in Madhya Pradesh, India Kelhauri (India)
- Coordinates: 23°11′11″N 81°37′58″E
- Country: India
- State: Madhya Pradesh
- District: anuppur

Population (2001)
  - Total: 9,531

Languages
  - Official: Hindi
- Time zone: UTC+5:30 (IST)
- ISO 3166 code: IN-MP
- Vehicle registration: MP

Kelhauri (Chachai) is a census town in Shahdol district in the Indian state of Madhya Pradesh.

== Demographics ==
As of 2001 India census, Kelhauri had a population of 9502. Males constitute 53% of the population and females 47%. Kelhauri has an average literacy rate of 70%, higher than the national average of 59.5%: male literacy is 78%, and female literacy is 61%. In Kelhauri, 13% of the population is under 6 years of age. now it is a part of Anuppur district.
