= Gohandra =

Village in Madhya Pradesh, India

- Location in Madhya Pradesh
- Coordinates: 23.228°N 81.980°E
- Country: India
- State: Madhya Pradesh
- District: Anuppur district

Population (2011)
  - Total: 1,074

Languages
  - Official: Hindi
- Time zone: UTC+5:30 (IST)

Gohandra is a village in Anuppur district of Madhya Pradesh, India.

== See also ==
- Anuppur district
