= Jaithari tehsil =

Jaithari
- Tehsil
- Location in Madhya Pradesh Jaithari (India)
- Coordinates: 23.041398°N 81.797839°E
- Country: India
- State: Madhya Pradesh
- District: Anuppur district

Government
  - Type: Janpad Panchayat
  - Body: Council

Area
  - Total: 909.49 km^{2} (351.16 sq mi)

Population (2011)
  - Total: 92,822

Languages
  - Official: Hindi
- Time zone: UTC+5:30 (IST)
- Postal code (PIN): 484330
- Area code: 07659
- ISO 3166 code: MP-IN
- Vehicle registration: MP 65
- No. of Villages: 67
- Sex ratio: 995

Jaithari tehsil is a fourth-order administrative and revenue division, a subdivision of third-order administrative and revenue division of Anuppur district of Madhya Pradesh.

== Geography ==
Jaithari tehsil has an area of 909.49 sq kilometers. It is bounded by Anuppur tehsil in the northwest, north and northeast, Chhattisgarh in the east, southeast and south and Pushprajgarh tehsil in the southwest and west.

== See also ==
- Anuppur district
