= Jaithari railway station =

Railway station in Madhya Pradesh

Jaithari

General information
- Location: PO Road, Nigaura, Jaithari, Anuppur district, Madhya Pradesh; India
- Coordinates: 23.045187°N 81.797092°E
- Elevation: 521 metres (1,709 ft)
- System: Indian Railways station
- Owner: Indian Railways
- Operator: South East Central Railway
- Line: Bilaspur–Katni line
- Platforms: 3
- Tracks: 2 (Double electrified BG)

Construction
- Structure type: Standard (on-ground station)
- Parking: yes
- Cycle facilities: yes

Other information
- Status: Functioning
- Station code: JTI
- Zone(s): South East Central Railway zone
- Division(s): Bilaspur

History
- Former names: Bengal Nagpur Railway

Services
Preceding station	Indian Railways	Following station
Chhulha towards ?	South East Central Railway zone Bilaspur–Katni line	Nigaura towards ?
Location

Jaithari railway station is a railway station on Bilaspur–Katni line under Bilaspur railway division of South East Central Railway Zone of Indian Railways. The railway station is situated beside PO Road at Nigaura, Jaithari in Anuppur district in the Indian state of Madhya Pradesh.

== History ==
Katni to Umaria railway line was constructed in 1886 as Katni–Umaria Provincial State Railway and in 1891 the line was extended to Bilaspur Junction by Bengal Nagpur Railway.
