= Devhara =

- Town
- Location in Madhya Pradesh, India Devhara (India)
- Coordinates: 23.1666°N 81.5758°E
- Country: India
- State: Madhya Pradesh
- District: Anuppur

Government
  - Type: Gram panchayat
  - Body: Panchayat

Area
  - Total: 100 km^{2} (39 sq mi)
- Elevation: 467 m (1,532 ft)

Population (2011)
  - Total: 17,827
  - Density: 180/km^{2} (460/sq mi)

Languages
  - Official: Hindi
- Time zone: UTC+5:30 (IST)
- Postal code: 484120
- Vehicle registration: MP65
- Website: www.devhara.net

Devhara is a census town in anuppur district in the state of Madhya Pradesh, India. Devhara is also the biggest gram panchayat in Anuppur district.

== Demographics ==
As of 2001 India census, Devhara had a population of 17,827. Males constitute 54% of the population and females 46%. Devhara has an average literacy rate of 73%, higher than the national average of 59.5%: male literacy is 76% and, female literacy is 69%. In Devhara, 13% of the population is under 6 years of age.

== Industry ==
The town is completely surrounded by coal mines. In Devhara there are Coal Refineries and open and underground coal mines. State highway SH 9a passes through the town which directly connects Rewa-shahdol-Amarkantak. Devhara is well connected by road and rail, amlai railway station is the nearest station falls 3 km. Devhara is well known as a wealthy and established town.
