= Bijuri =

- Town
- Location in Madhya Pradesh, India Bijuri (India)
- Coordinates: 23.2707100°N 82.1245700°E
- Country: India
- State: Madhya Pradesh
- District: Anuppur

Population (2001)
  - Total: 25,618

Languages
  - Official: Hindi
- Time zone: UTC+5:30 (IST)
- PIN: 484440
- Telephone code: 07658-264___
- Vehicle registration: MP-65

Bijuri is a town and a Municipality or Municipal Council or Nagar Palika Parishad in Anuppur district in the state of Madhya Pradesh, India.

== Geography ==
Bijuri is located at 23°16′15″N 82°07′28″E.

== Transport ==
=== Rail connectivity ===
The Bijuri railway station, situated on the Anuppur–Ambikapur rail route, is a loco railway station with three platforms.

The following is a list of all the trains that start from and pass through Bijuri (BJRI) Railway Station:

=== To ABKP ===
1. Durg - Ambikapur Express
2. Manendergarh - Ambikapur Passenger
3. Shahdol- Ambikapur Memu
4. Shahdol - Ambikapur Passenger
5. Jabalpur - Ambikapur Intercity Express

=== To CHRM ===
1. Rewa - Chirimiri Fast Passenger
2. Bilaspur - Chirimiri Passenger
3. Anuppur - Chirimiri Passenger
4. Chandia Road - Chirimiri Passenger
5. Katni - Chirimiri Passenger
6. Anuppur - Manendragarh Passenger

=== To APR ===
1. Ambikapur - Durg Passenger Express (18242)
2. Chirimiri - Durg Passenger Express (28242)
3. Chirimiri - Saugor Passenger (51755)
4. Ambikapur - Jabalpur Intercity Express (11266)
5. Chirimiri - Chandia Road Passenger (58221)
6. Ambikapur - Shahdol Passenger (58702)
7. Ambikapur - Anuppur Passenger (58224)
8. Chirimiri - Rewa Fast Passenger (51754)
9. Ambikapur - Anuppur Menu (68750)
10. Chirimiri - Bilasapur Passenger (58220)

=== By Road ===
National Highway 43 connects Bijuri with other parts of the state. Buses services operate between cities of Madhya Pradesh, Chhattisgarh, Uttar Pradesh, Jharkhand and Bihar.

=== By Air ===
The nearest airport is Bilasa Devi Kevat Airport, which is located in Bilaspur.

== Demographics ==
In a 2011 census, Bijuri had a population of 32,682.

== Economy ==
Bijuri is a coal mining area and a sub-area of Hasdeo area (SECL), controlling many coal mines of this region under the umbrella of Bijuri Sub-Area Office.
