= Pushprajgarh tehsil =

Pushprajgarh
- Tehsil
- Location in Madhya Pradesh Pushprajgarh (India)
- Coordinates: 22.936°N 81.601°E
- Country: India
- State: Madhya Pradesh
- District: Anuppur district

Government
  - Type: Janpad Panchayat
  - Body: Council

Area
  - Total: 1,652.20 km^{2} (637.92 sq mi)

Population (2011)
  - Total: 230,005
  - Density: 139.211/km^{2} (360.556/sq mi)

Languages
  - Official: Hindi
- Time zone: UTC+5:30 (IST)
- Postal code (PIN): 484886
- Area code: 07629
- ISO 3166 code: MP-IN
- Vehicle registration: MP 65
- No. of Villages: 271
- Sex ratio: 994

Pushprajgarh tehsil (पुष्पराजगढ़) is a fourth-order administrative and revenue division, a subdivision of third-order administrative and revenue division of Anuppur district (अनूपपुर) of Madhya Pradesh. This tehsil contains Amarkantak, the source of the Narmada and a popular pilgrimage site.

== Geography ==
Pushprajgarh tehsil has an area of 1,652.20 km^{2} (637.92 sq mi). It is bounded by Umaria district in the northwest, Shahdol district in the north, northeast, Jaithari tehsil in the east, Chhattisgarh in the southeast, Dindori district in the south, southwest and west.

== Demographics ==
At the time of the 2011 census, Pushparajgarh tehsil has a population of 230,005. Scheduled Castes and Scheduled Tribes make up 7.19% and 76.84% of the population respectively. 94.82% of the population speaks Hindi and 3.53% Gondi as their first language. The local dialect of Hindi is a mix of Bagheli and Chhattisgarhi.

== See also ==
- Anuppur district
