= Uslapur railway station =

Railway station in Chhattisgarh, India

Uslapur
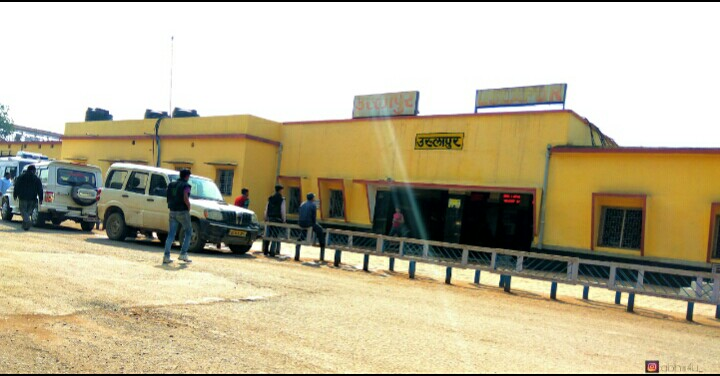
- Railway station

General information
- Location: Mungeli Road, Uslapur, Bilaspur, Chhattisgarh; India
- Coordinates: 22.1°N 82.1°E
- Elevation: 277 m (909 ft)
- System: Indian Railways station
- Owner: Indian Railways
- Operator: South East Central Railway
- Platforms: 3
- Tracks: 5 (double electrified 5 ft 6 in (1,676 mm) broad gauge)

Construction
- Structure type: Standard (on-ground station)
- Parking: Yes
- Cycle facilities: No

Other information
- Status: Functioning
- Station code: USL
- Zone(s): South East Central Railway
- Division(s): Bilaspur

History
- Former names: Bengal Nagpur Railway

Passengers
- 12000
Location

Uslapur railway station is a Satellite Railway Station of Bilaspur Railway Station in the region of Bilaspur, Chhattisgarh in India. It is the second most important railway stations within Bilaspur city, after Bilaspur Railway Station. Uslapur is the second biggest railway station in the Bilaspur district. Uslapur is situated west of Bilaspur city and falls under Bilaspur - Katni Section of Bilaspur Division and Trains Bypassing Bilaspur Jn Railway have halts at Uslapur Railway Station, some major trains halting at Uslapur Railway are Durg- Hazrat Nizamuddin Humsafar Express, Raipur-Lucknow Garib rath Express, Durg-Udhampur, Durg-Ajmer, Durg-Amibkapur, Sarnath Express, Betwa Express, Nautanwa Express . The station has three well-furnished railway platforms.

== Connectivity to other major cities ==
Uslapur railway station has direct connections to the following stations: Durg, Bhilai, Raipur, Bilaspur, Anuppur, Shehdol, Umaria, Katni, Satna, Allahabad, Varanasi, Mirzapur, Balia, Chappra, Baikunthpur, Surajpur, Ambikapur, Chirmiri, Damoh, Sagar, Jhansi, Gwalior, Delhi, Jammu Tawi, Gorakhpur, Nautanwa, Ashoknagar, Guns, Kota, Ajmer, Jaipur, Jabalpur, Narsinghpur, Hoshngabad, Sehore, Bhopal, Dewas, Maksi, Ujjain, Indore, Vidisha, Rewa, Banda, Kanpur, Lucknow, Gondia, Barauni, Muzaffarpur, Maha Samund, Visakhapatnam, Bhagat Ki Kothi, Vizianagaram, Rayagada, Parvatipuram, Agra, Mathura, Naya Raipur, Itarsi, etc.

== Distance of other railway stations of Bilaspur city from Uslapur station ==
- Bilaspur Junction – 9 km
- Dadhapara – 12 km
- Ghutku – 7 km
- Chakarbhata -16 km
- Gatoura – 16 km
- Maal Godam – 6 km

== Connectivity with city ==
There are direct connections to the whole city. Autos are available for nearly all localities of the city. Ola cabs are running in the city. Out of 85, there are 16 city buses that connect Uslapur with other locations of the city.

== Major trains ==
- Durg–Chhapra Sarnath Express
- Durg–Ambikapur Express
- Durg–Chirmiri Express
- Durg–Jammu Tawi Express
- Durg–Nautanwa Express (via Varanasi)
- Durg–Jaipur Weekly Express
- Bilaspur–Indore Narmada Express
- Bilaspur–Bhopal Passenger
- Bilaspur–Katni MEMU
- Bilaspur–Pendra Road MEMU
- Bilaspur–Rewa Passenger
- Bilaspur–Chirmiri Passenger
- Lucknow–Raipur Garib Rath Express
- Visakhapatnam–Bhagat Ki Kothi Express
