= Sarbahara railway station =

Railway station in Chattishgarh

Sarbahara

General information
- Location: Pendra-Paterkoni Road, Sarbahara, Bilaspur district, Chattisgargh; India
- Coordinates: 22.710502°N 81.910429°E
- Elevation: 588 metres (1,929 ft)
- System: Indian Railways station
- Owner: Indian Railways
- Operator: South East Central Railway
- Line: Bilaspur–Katni line
- Platforms: 2
- Tracks: 2 (Double electrified BG)

Construction
- Structure type: Standard (on-ground station)

Other information
- Status: Functioning
- Station code: SBRA
- Zone(s): South East Central Railway zone
- Division(s): Bilaspur

History
- Former names: Bengal Nagpur Railway

Services
Preceding station	Indian Railways	Following station
Pendra Road towards ?	South East Central Railway zone Bilaspur–Katni line	Khodri towards ?
Location

Sarbahara railway station is a railway station on Bilaspur–Katni line under Bilaspur railway division of South East Central Railway Zone of Indian Railways. The railway station is situated beside Pendra-Paterkoni Road at Sarbahara in Bilaspur district in the Indian state of Chattisgargh.

== History ==
Katni to Umaria railway line was constructed in 1886 as Katni–Umaria Provincial State Railway and in 1891 the line was extended to Bilaspur Junction by Bengal Nagpur Railway.
