= Shahdol division =

Administrative division of Madhya Pradesh, India

Coordinates: 23°16′48″N 81°21′00″E

Map of Shahdol Division

Shahdol Division is an administrative division of the Indian state of Madhya Pradesh.

The division was inaugurated on 14 June, 2008. It comprises Shahdol, Umaria, Anuppur. The total area of this administrative division is 13,920 km^{2} (5,370 sq mi). At present, there are only three districts in Shahdol division i.e., Shahdol, Umaria and Anuppur. Anuppur, Shahdol and Umaria districts used to be part of Rewa Division. Initially Dindori was also the part of this division, but now it is in Jabalpur division.

The division forms a part of the Baghelkhand region of Madhya Pradesh.
