= Achanakmar Wildlife Sanctuary =

Wildlife sanctuary and Tiger reserve in central India

- IUCN category IV (habitat/species management area)
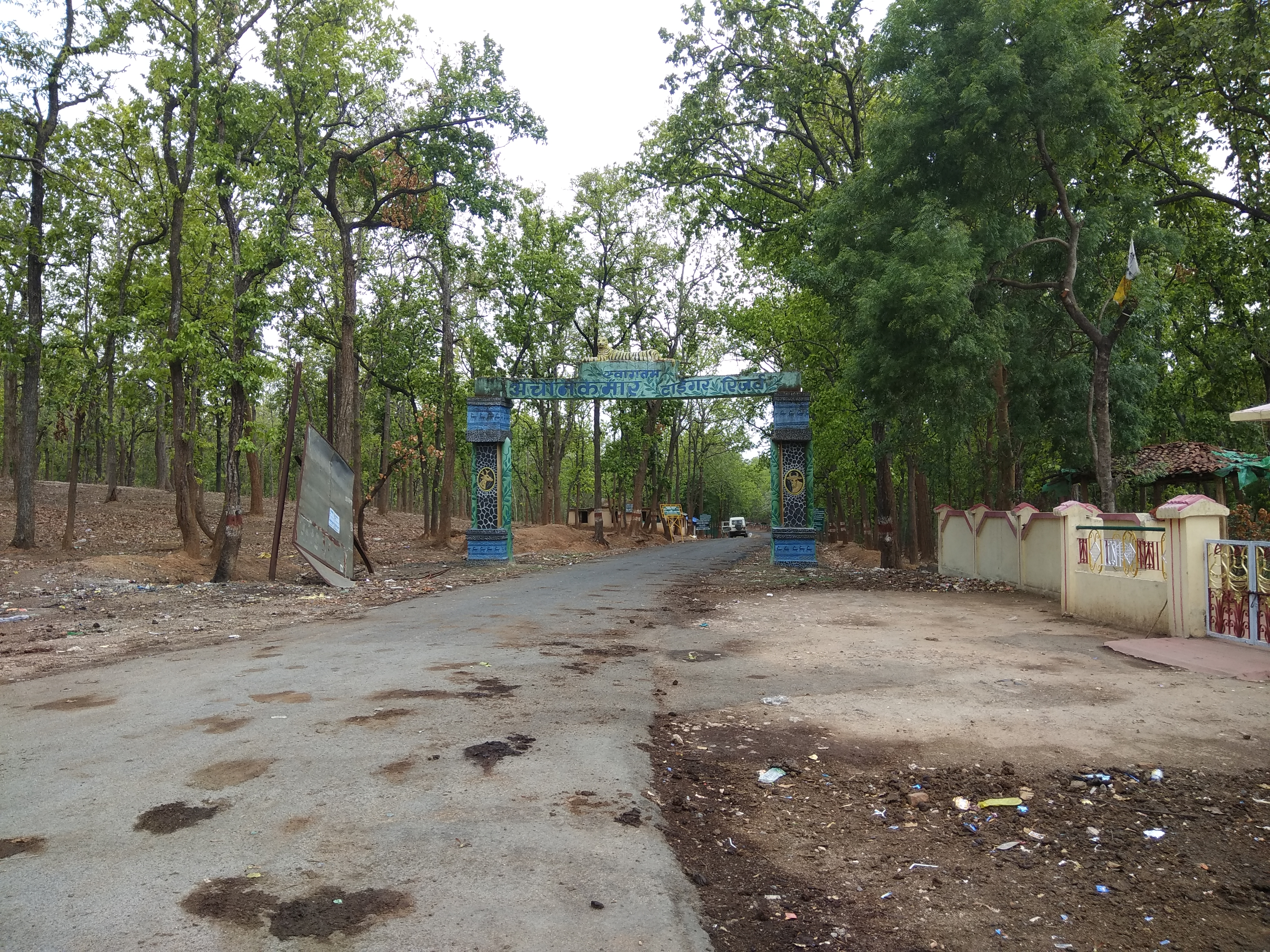
- Entry gate of Achanakmar Tiger Reserve

- Location within Chhattisgarh Location within Madhya Pradesh Location within India
- Interactive map of Achanakmar Wildlife Sanctuary
- Location: Mungeli, Bilaspur district, Chhattisgarh; Anuppur, Dindori District, Madhya Pradesh, India
- Coordinates: 22.55°N 81.73°E
- Area: 557.55 km^{2} (215.27 sq mi)
- Designation: Tiger Reserve
- Established: 1975 (Wildlife Sanctuary); 2009 (Tiger Reserve)

Achanakmar Wildlife Sanctuary is a sanctuary in Mungeli district and Gaurela Pendra Marwahi district of Chhattisgarh and in the Anuppur and Dindori districts of Madhya Pradesh in India. It was established in 1975, under the provisions of the Indian Wildlife Protection Act of 1972, and declared as a Tiger Reserve under Project Tiger, in 2009. It is a part of the Achanakmar-Amarkantak Biosphere Reserve.

A total of 25 forest villages are located within the core area of the Achanakmar Tiger Reserve. Of these, five villages (Jalda, Bahaud, Bokrakachar, Bakal, and Kuba) were successfully relocated outside the core area in 2010 for wildlife conservation, leaving 20 villages (or administratively 19-22 settlements) remaining within the original core area.

A total of 418 villages fall within the broader Achanakmar-Amarkantak Biosphere Reserve (which includes the core, buffer, and transition areas).

Location and Topography on Map: The Achanakmar Tiger Reserve is primarily spread across the hilly areas of Mungeli, Gaurela Pendra Marwahi, and Bilaspur districts of Chhattisgarh and the bordering Anuppur and Dindori districts of Madhya Pradesh. Its location on the map and on the ground can be understood from the following key points:

- Geographical Coordinates: On the map, the reserve is located approximately between 22°24′ and 22°35′ North latitude and 81°34′ and 81°85′ East longitude.
- Maikal Mountain Range: The entire area is part of the Maikal Hills of the Satpura mountain range, which forms a rugged landscape with hills and undulating plateaus.
- Main River (Central part of the map): The Maniyari River flows right through the center of Achanakmar. This river appears on the map as the lifeline of this entire forest.
- Entry Points: On the map, its main entrance is located approximately 60-80 km from Bilaspur, Chhattisgarh, via the Kota and Lormi development blocks (e.g., Shivtarai Naka). To the north, it connects with the Amarkantak Hills (the source of the Narmada River).
  - Status of Major Forest Villages:

Some of the major villages located within the core and buffer zones are Lamani, Surhi, Jakarbandha, Dagania, Mahamai, and Chhaparwa. These villages are primarily nestled among dense Sal and bamboo forests.

- The list of all 25 forest villages located within the core area of the Achanakmar Tiger Reserve is officially divided into two categories. Of these, six villages have been completely relocated (rehabilitated) in the first phase, and the remaining 19 villages are currently located within the core forest area, and their relocation is underway.

The authentic list of all 25 villages is as follows:

(A) Total 6 villages displaced in the first phase (2010) 1. Jalda 2. Bahaud / Bahaur 3. Bokrakachar 4. Bankal / Bakal 5. Kumba / Kuba 6. Sambhardasan These villages were the first to be successfully relocated outside the core area to protect wildlife and create inviolate space for tigers.

(B) The remaining 19 villages currently located in the core area These are the villages located amidst the dense forests of Achanakmar. Of these, the administrative process for relocating Chhihadda, Virarpani, and Tiledabara near the Lormi Range in the next phase is in the final stages: 7. Achanakmar (Achanakmar - the village after which the entire sanctuary is named) 8. Lamni 9. Chaparwa 10. Surhi 11. Mahamai 12. Tilai Dabra 13. Birarpani / Virar Pani 14. Chhihadda / Chirhatta 15. Jakarbandha / Jakarbandha 16. Daganiya 17. Rajak (Ranjaki) 18. Bindhawal / Bindrawal (Bindhaval) 19. Chhertapung 20. Saraswati 21. Tatadhar 22. Ataria 23. Katami 24. Andiyaw 25. Siyari

== Geography ==
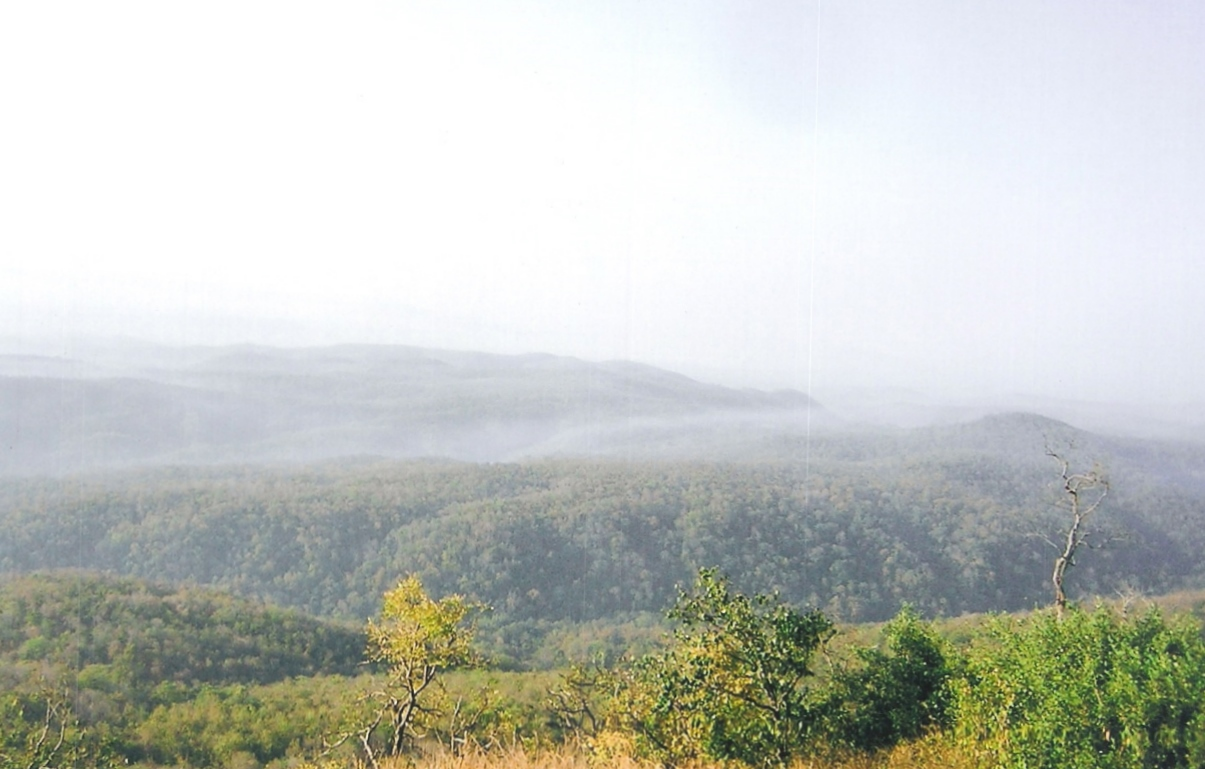
View of Achanakmar

Linked by the hilly Kanha-Achanakmar Corridor to the tiger reserve in Kanha, Madhya Pradesh, the sanctuary comprises 557.55 km^{2} (215.27 sq mi) of forest. The park is part of Mungeli And Bilaspur Forest Division in northwest Chhattisgarh, around 50 km (31 mi) north of Mungeli. The sanctuary is close to Amarkantak, the source of the Son River and Narmada River.

== Flora ==
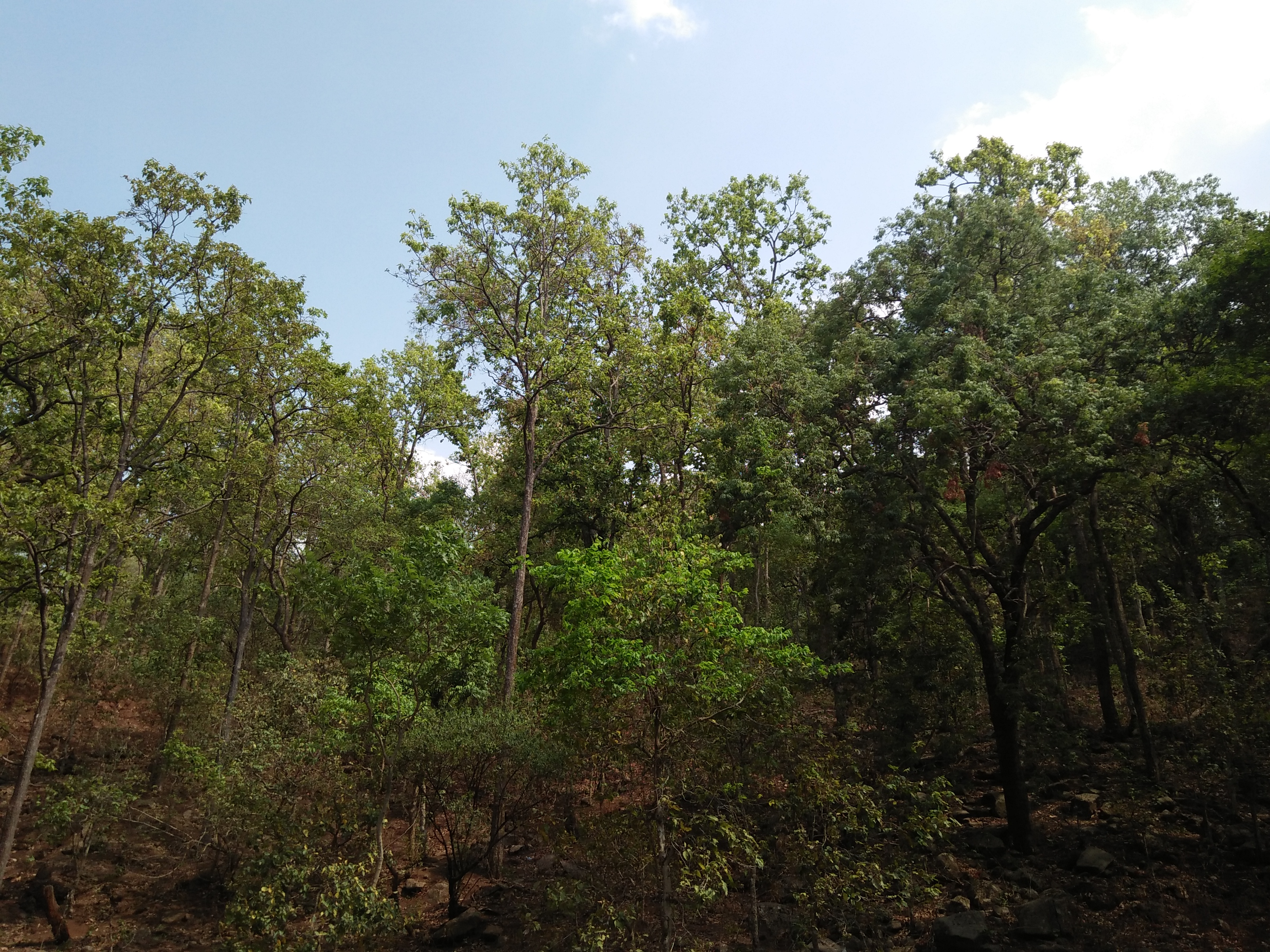
Amarkantak Forest

Forest vegetation mainly comprises Sal, Saja, Bija, and Bamboo.

== Fauna ==
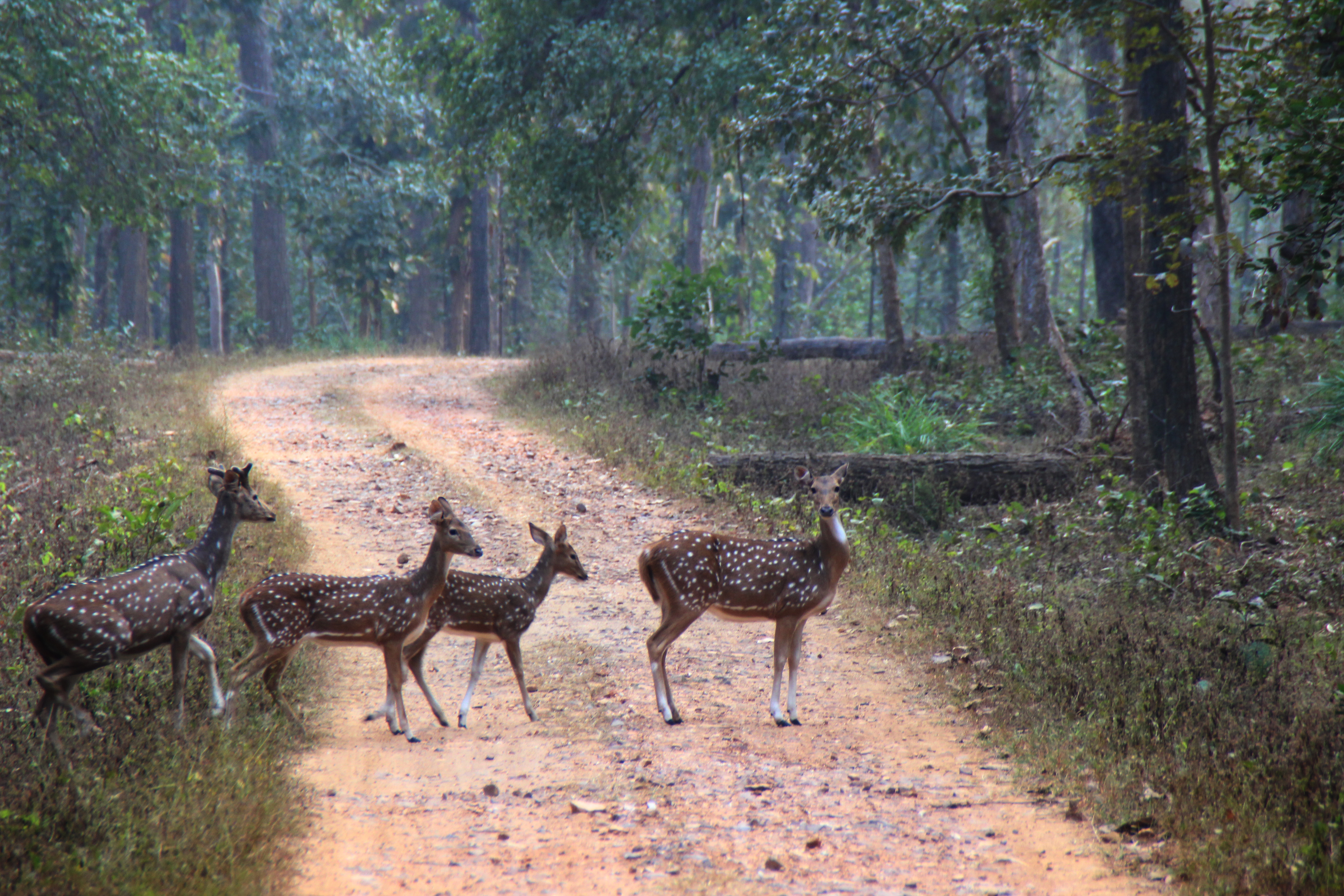
Spotted deer herd

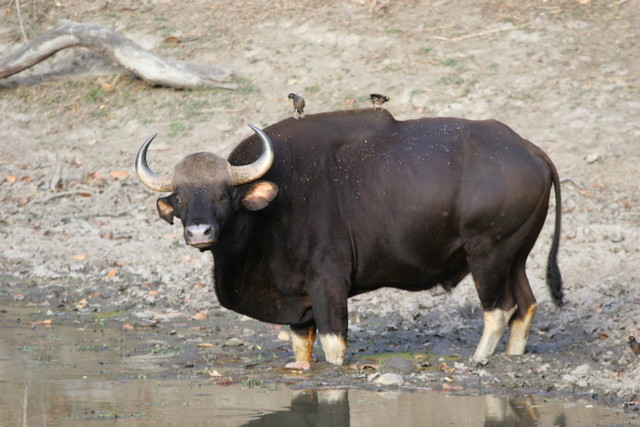
A gaur bull

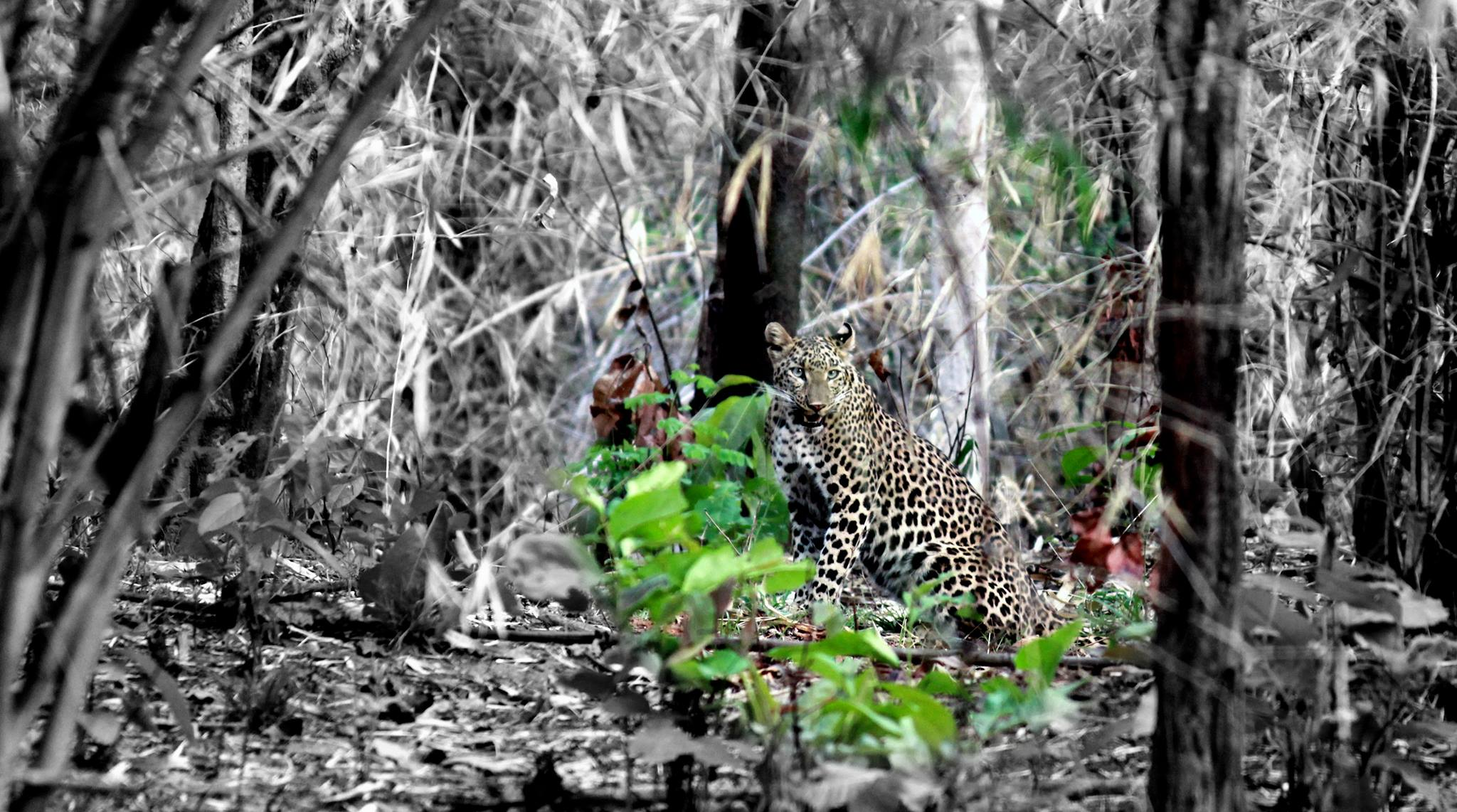
Leopard in Achanakmar

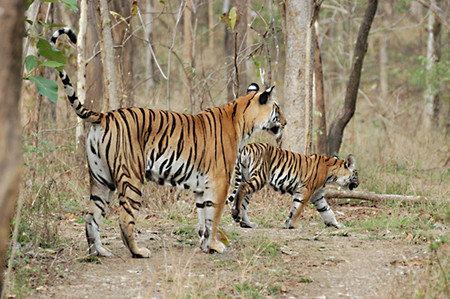
Two of the sanctuary's C.35 Bengal tigers

The sanctuary is home to the Bengal tiger, Indian leopard, chital, sambar, nilgai, gaur, elephant, four-horned antelope, chinkara, blackbuck, Indian muntjac, wild boar, striped hyena, Indian jackal, sloth bear and dhole.

== See also ==
- Indian Council of Forestry Research and Education
- Tourism in Chhattisgarh
