= Kalmitar railway station =

Railway station in Chhattisgarh

Kalmitar

General information
- Location: Patharra, Kalmitar, Uslapur, Bilaspur district, Chattisgargh; India
- Coordinates: 22.234246°N 82.057635°E
- Elevation: 300 metres (980 ft)
- System: Indian Railways station
- Owner: Indian Railways
- Operator: South East Central Railway
- Line: Bilaspur–Katni line
- Platforms: 3
- Tracks: 2 (Double electrified BG)

Construction
- Structure type: Standard (on-ground station)

Other information
- Status: Functioning
- Station code: KLTR
- Zone(s): South East Central Railway zone
- Division(s): Bilaspur

History
- Former names: Bengal Nagpur Railway

Services
Preceding station	Indian Railways	Following station
Kargi Road towards ?	South East Central Railway zone Bilaspur–Katni line	Ghutku towards ?
Location

Kalmitar railway station is a railway station on Bilaspur–Katni line under Bilaspur railway division of South East Central Railway Zone of Indian Railways. The railway station is situated at Patharra, Kalmitar, Uslapur in Bilaspur district in the Indian state of Chattisgargh.

== History ==
Katni to Umaria railway line was constructed in 1886 as Katni–Umaria Provincial State Railway and in 1891 the line was extended to Bilaspur Junction by Bengal Nagpur Railway.
