= Harri railway station =

Railway station in Chattishgarh

Harri

General information
- Location: Bilaspur-Gangpur Road, Bilaspur district, Chattisgargh; India
- Coordinates: 22.82794°N 81.882604°E
- Elevation: 596 metres (1,955 ft)
- System: Indian Railways station
- Owner: Indian Railways
- Operator: South East Central Railway
- Line: Bilaspur–Katni line
- Platforms: 3
- Tracks: 2 (Double electrified BG)

Construction
- Structure type: Standard (on-ground station)
- Parking: yes
- Cycle facilities: yes

Other information
- Status: Functioning
- Station code: HRB
- Zone(s): South East Central Railway zone
- Division(s): Bilaspur

History
- Former names: Bengal Nagpur Railway

Services
Preceding station	Indian Railways	Following station
Venkatnagar towards ?	South East Central Railway zone Bilaspur–Katni line	Pendra Road towards ?
Location

Harri railway station is a railway station on Bilaspur–Katni line under Bilaspur railway division of South East Central Railway Zone of Indian Railways. The railway station is situated beside Bilaspur-Gangpur Road at Gangpur in Bilaspur district in the Indian state of Chattisgargh.

== History ==
Katni to Umaria railway line was constructed in 1886 as Katni–Umaria Provincial State Railway and in 1891 the line was extended to Bilaspur Junction by Bengal Nagpur Railway.
