= Kargi Road railway station =

Railway station in Chhattisgarh

Kargi Road

General information
- Location: Kota Lormi Road, Kota, Bilaspur district, Chattisgargh; India
- Coordinates: 22.297935°N 82.026832°E
- Elevation: 327 metres (1,073 ft)
- System: Indian Railways station
- Owner: Indian Railways
- Operator: South East Central Railway
- Line: Bilaspur–Katni line
- Platforms: 3
- Tracks: 2 (Double electrified BG)

Construction
- Structure type: Standard (on-ground station)

Other information
- Status: Functioning
- Station code: KGB
- Zone(s): South East Central Railway zone
- Division(s): Bilaspur

History
- Former names: Bengal Nagpur Railway

Services
| Preceding station | Indian Railways | Following station |
|---|---|---|
| Salkaroad towards ? | South East Central Railway zone Bilaspur–Katni line | Kalmitar towards ? |
Location

Kargi Road railway station is a railway station on Bilaspur–Katni line under Bilaspur railway division of South East Central Railway Zone of Indian Railways. The railway station is situated beside Kota Lormi Road at Kota in Bilaspur district in the Indian state of Chattisgargh.

== History ==
Katni to Umaria railway line was constructed in 1886 as Katni–Umaria Provincial State Railway and in 1891 the line was extended to Bilaspur Junction by Bengal Nagpur Railway.
