= Amarkantak =

Amarkantak Amrakuta
- Hill station
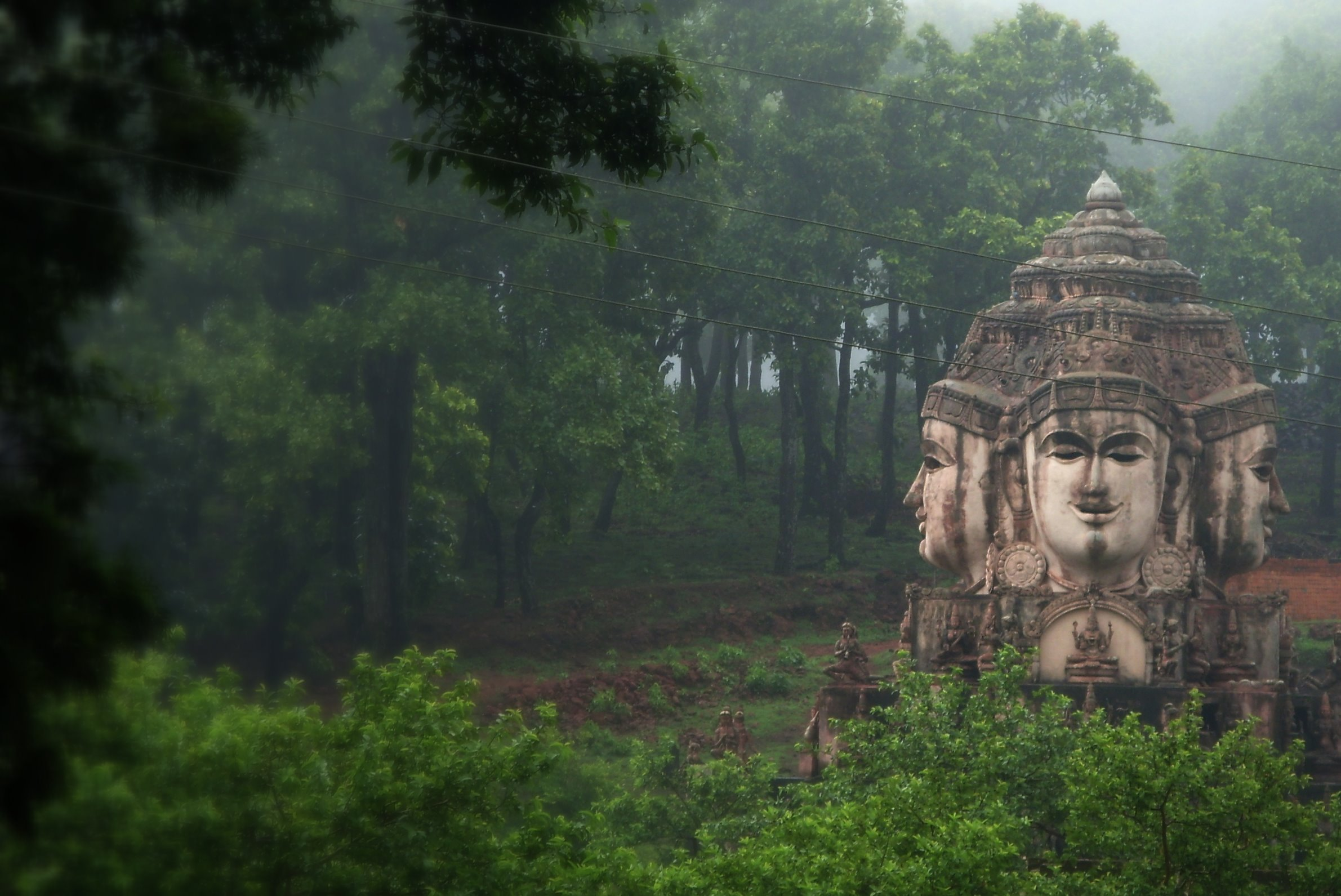
- Amarkantak is a Hindu Tirtha place, a site where three rivers including the Narmada, Sone River start
- Nickname: Maikal
- Location in Madhya Pradesh, India Amarkantak (Madhya Pradesh)
- Coordinates: 22°40′23.851″N 81°45′34.364″E
- Country: India
- State: Madhya Pradesh
- District: Anuppur

Government
  - Type: Local Government
  - Body: Nagar Panchayat

Area
  - Total: 47 km^{2} (18 sq mi)
- Elevation: 1,048 m (3,438 ft)

Population (2011)
  - Total: 8,416
  - Density: 181/km^{2} (470/sq mi)

Languages
  - Official: Hindi
- Time zone: UTC+5:30 (IST)
- PIN: 484886
- ISO 3166 code: IN-MP

Amarkantak (NLK Amarakaṇṭaka) is a pilgrim town and a Nagar Panchayat in Anuppur, Madhya Pradesh, India. The Amarkantak region is a unique natural heritage area. It is the meeting point of the Vindhya and the Satpura Ranges, with the Maikal Hills being the fulcrum. This is where the Narmada River, the Sone River and Johilla River (tributary of Sone) originate.

15th-century Indian mystic and poet Kabir is said to have meditated in Amarkantak, and the place is now known as Kabir Chabutra.

== Etymology ==
The name Amarakaṇṭaka is a combination of two Sanskrit words, amara (immortal) and kaṇṭaka (obstruction or thorn). The poet Kalidas has mentioned it as Amarakuta, which later became Amarakaṇṭaka.

== Historical mentions ==
Amarakaṇṭaka is mentioned in several Purāṇas and other historical Hindu texts: for example, the Matsya Purāṇa describes it as a mountain to the west of Kaliṅga, "one yojana all round in extent", where the Narmadā has its source; it further describes Amarakaṇṭaka as "a tīrtha that dispels all sins". The Kūrma Purāṇa also identifies Amarakaṇṭaka as the source of the Narmadā and says that there is "high merit" of visiting it during a solar or lunar eclipse. The Vāyu Purāṇa and Viṣṇudharmasūtra both extol the benefits of doing śrāddha on the mountain of Amarakaṇṭaka.

== Location ==
Amarkantak is located in Madhya Pradesh in India at 22.67°N 81.75°E. It has an average elevation of 1,048 m (3,438 ft). Roads running through Rewa, Shahdol, Anuppur, Jabalpur, Katni, Bilaspur and Gaurella connect it. The nearest railway stations are Pendra Road and Anuppur. The nearest airport is Bilaspur Airport (120 km).

== Demographics ==
Per the 2011 India census, Amarkantak has a population of 8,416 of which 4,514 are males and 3,902 are females. The female sex ratio is 864 against a state average of 931. Moreover, the child sex ratio in Amarkantak is around 931 compared to Madhya Pradesh's state average of 918. Literacy rate of Amarkantak city is 80.20%, higher than the state average of 69.32%. Male literacy is around 88.06% and the female literacy rate is 71.02%. 95.51% of the population follow Hinduism.

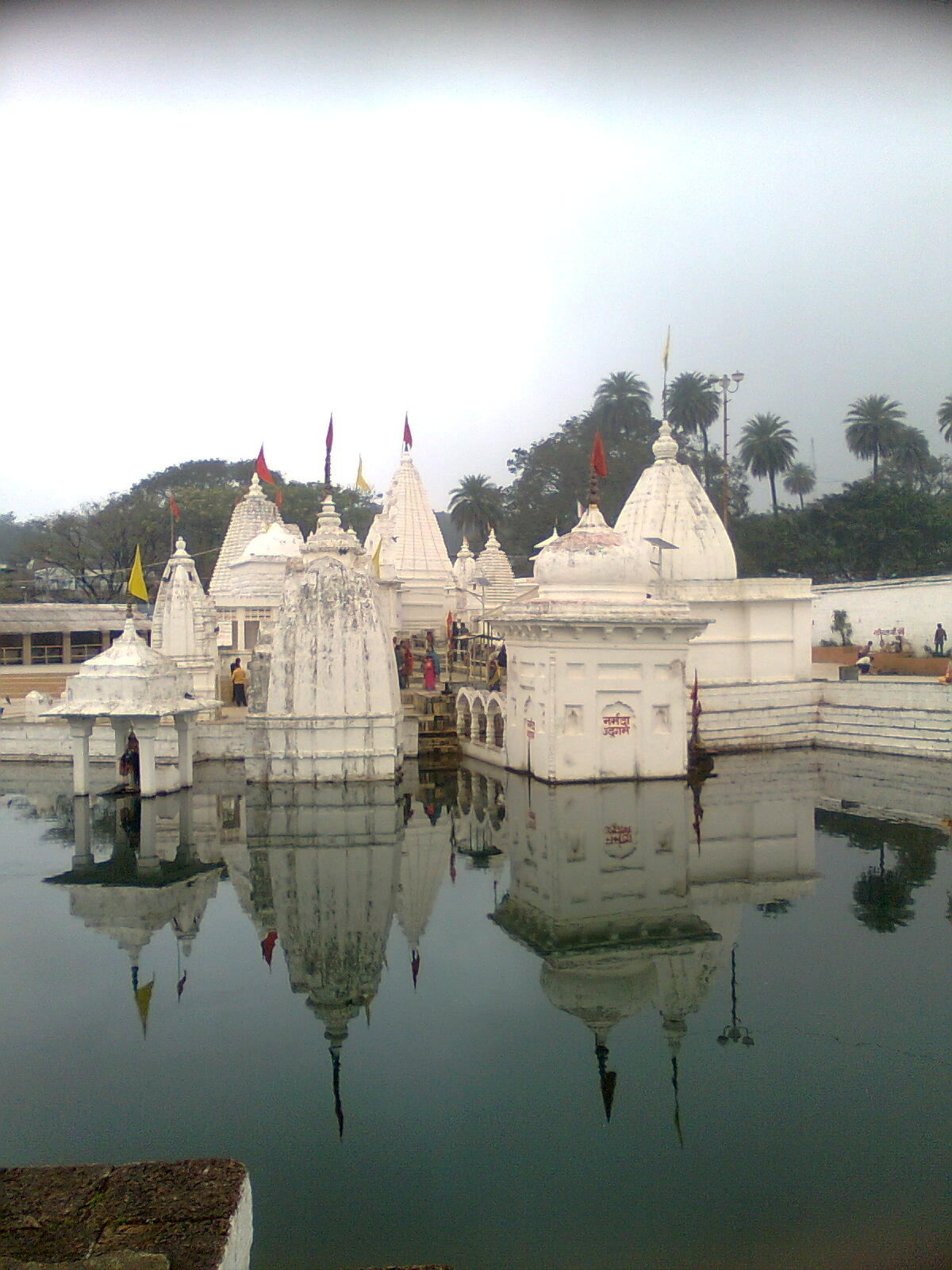
Narmada Kund temples, the origin of Narmada River

== Religious significance ==
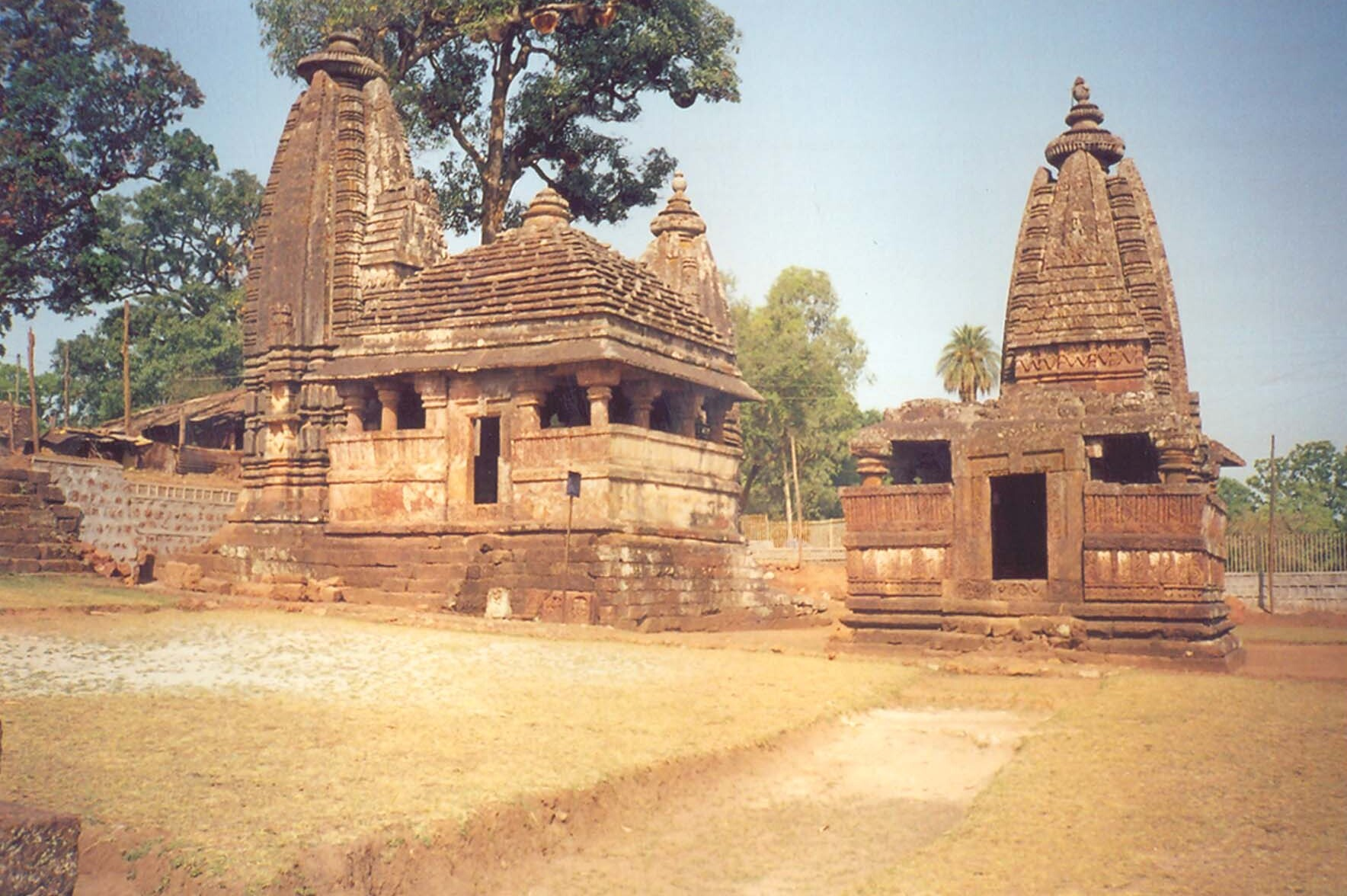
Ancient temples, Amarkantak

Amarkantak is known as the king of pilgrimages, or Tirthraj, because the town has many temples and holy places. It is narrated in the Hindu scriptures like the Puranas that Amarkantak is the place where celestial beings, sages, and others obtained spiritual powers. There are many ancient temples of the Kalachuri period in Amarkantak Which were built by different Kalachuri Kings, indicating it was a prominent site for the Kalchuris. Some of those temples were:

- Sarvodaya Jain temple] is Jain temple dedicated to Rishabhanatha
- Pataleshwar Temple: It is an ancient temple where Bhagwan Shiva is the deity and the Shiv Lingam was installed by Adi Shankaracharya during his visit. The temple was later constructed by King Lakshmikarna.
- Narmada Temple: It is the main temple of the town. It is said that Shankaracharya on his quest to determine the source of Narmada declared the stream currently at the temple to be the mainstream, the temple was later constructed by Kalachuris of Tripuri in the 12th century CE and Renovated by Maharani Ahilyabai Holkar.

== Flora and fauna ==
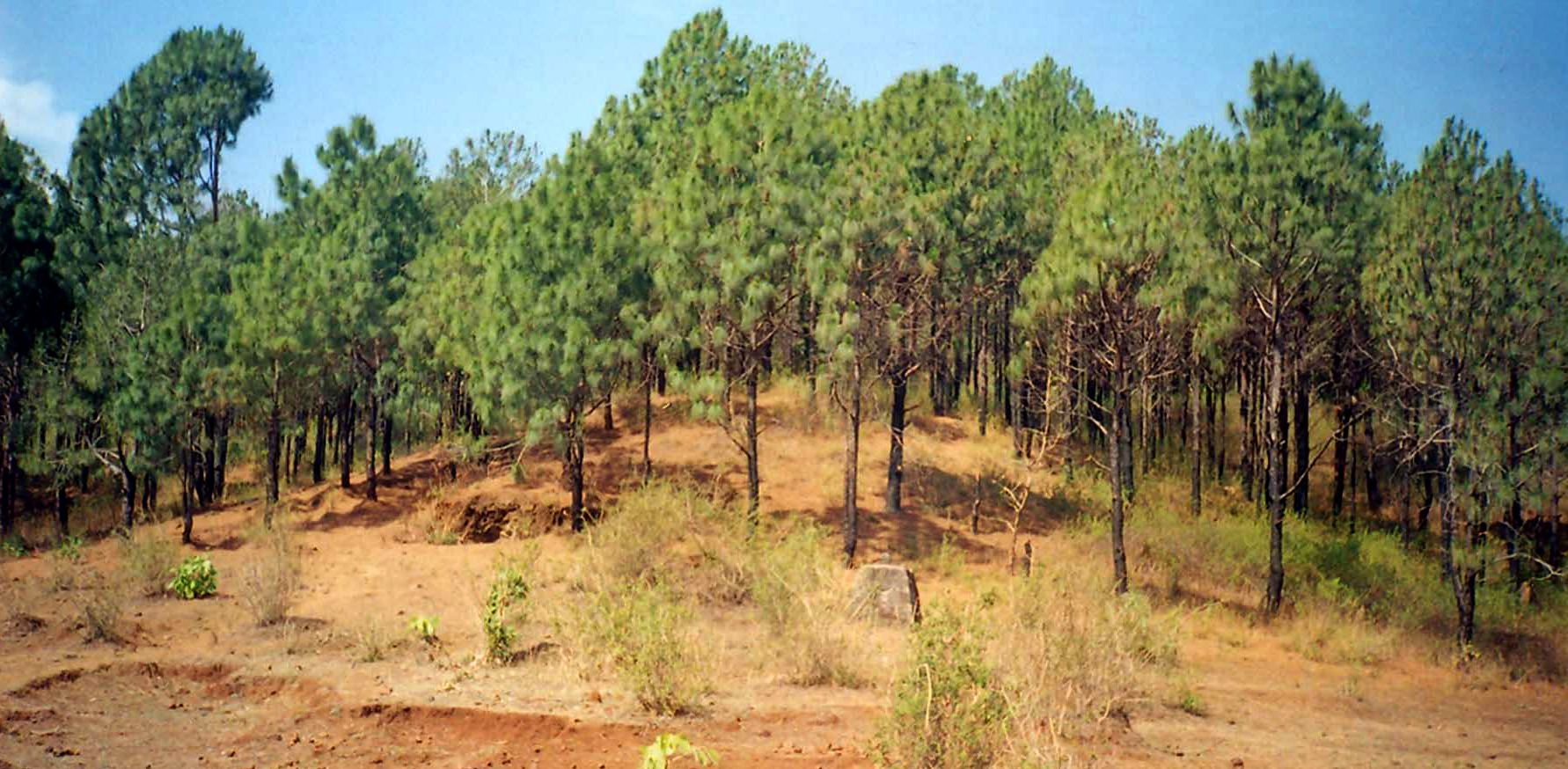
Pinus caribaea plantation at Amarkantak, India

There are more than 600 species of flora found in Amarkantak. It also has many medicinal flora and some of which include Boswellia serrata, Terminalia chebula, Hedychium coronarium, and Curcuma caesia. The Achanakmar Wildlife Sanctuary, is located at a distance of no more than 40 km from the town of Amarkantak in the state of Chhattisgarh on the road to Bilaspur. The forest belt in Amarkantak is a part of Achanakmar-Amarkantak Biosphere Reserve. The forests of Amarkantak are linked with the forests of Kanha National Park. Amarkantak falls on the Kanha-Achanakmar Corridor, a hilly region with dense forests. Kanha and Achanakmar are both conserved wildlife parks in India famous for Bengal tigers.

Pinus caribaea, known as tropical pine, was planted in Amarkantak in 1968 on the advice of Forest Research Institute, Dehradun on the recommendations of National Commission on Agriculture looking to the future demand of quality pulpwood. This work was undertaken under a World Bank Technical Assistance Project by clearing natural sal forests. The naturalists and environmentalists in India raised controversy over it; ultimately the project of tropical pine plantation was abolished.

== Educational institutions ==
Indira Gandhi National Tribal University was established in Amarkantak by an Act of Parliament in 2007. It was created to promote and provide higher education and research in various aspects of tribal communities. The Jawahar Navodaya Vidyalaya was established in 1987 to provide education for the rural young.
