= Pendra =

- Municipal council
- Location in Chhattisgarh, India Pendra (India)
- Coordinates: 22.77°N 81.95°E
- Country: India
- State: Chhattisgarh
- District: Gaurella Pendra Marwahi
- Elevation: 592 m (1,942 ft)

Population (2011)
  - Total: 16,496

Languages
  - Official: Hindi, Chhattisgarhi
- Time zone: UTC+5:30 (IST)
- Postal code: 495119
- Vehicle registration: CG31

Pendra is a nagar panchayat in the Gaurella-Pendra-Marwahi district in the Indian state of Chhattisgarh.

== Geography ==
Pendra is located on 22.77°N 81.95°E. It has an average elevation of 617 metres (2,024 ft). Its sarounded with Maikal hills.

== Demographics ==
As of the 2001 India census, Pendra had a population of 12,392. Males constitute 50% of the population and females 50%. Pendra road has an average literacy rate of 70%, higher than the national average of 59.5%: male literacy is 78%, and female literacy is 63%. In Pendra, 13% of the population is under 6 years of age.

== See also ==
- Gaurella-Pendra-Marwahi district
