= Sarvodaya Jain temple =

Jain temples in the state of Madhya Pradesh

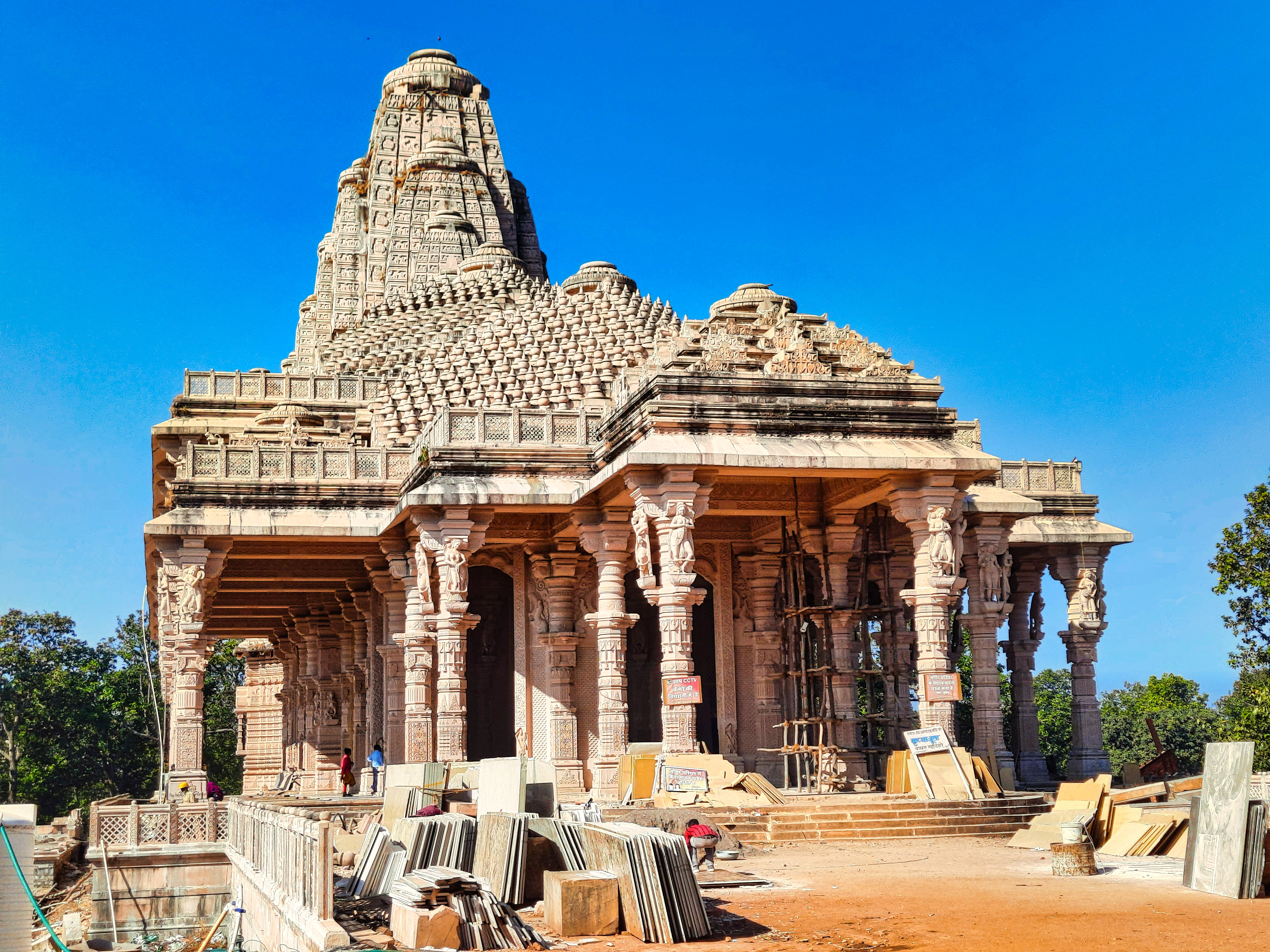
- Sarvodaya Jain temple

Religion
- Affiliation: Jainism
- Deity: Rishabhanatha
- Festival: Mahavir Jayanti

Location
- Location: Amarkantak, Anuppur, Madhya Pradesh
- Interactive map of Sarvodaya Jain temple
- Coordinates: 22°40′45″N 81°45′35″E

Architecture
- Established: 2006
- Completed: Under construction
- Temple: 2

Sarvodaya Jain temple is a Jain temple in Amarkantak town in Anuppur, Madhya Pradesh. Nearest airport is Raipur C.G. and nearest railway station is Pendra road (SEC Rly)C.G. You can also reach easily from Bilaspur CG and Anuppur MP, by Car. Rental car, taxi and auto rickshaw are easily available From Pendra Road. Many Lodges, Ashram and Hotels are available in Amarkantak and as well as Pendraroad. Amarkantak is a well-known Teerth. It is famous for beautiful Nature, mountains and climate. Ma Narmada Temple, Narmada kund, Kapil dhara, Dudh Dhara, Son muda, Mai ki bagiya, Durga dhara, Bhrigu kamandal, Arandi ashram, Kalyan ashram and many more attractive places are Beauty of Amarkantak. Beauty and architecture of Sarvoday Jain temple is also remarkable.

== History ==
The temple construction started under the guidance of Acharya Vidyasagar in 2006. Upon completion the height of the temple will be 151 feet, width 125 feet and length 490 feet. Bhairon Singh Shekhawat, the former Vice President of India, laid the foundation stone of the temple.

== Architecture ==
The temple, is being constructed using lime and preserved stones. The temple complex constructed without cement and iron. The mulnayak of the temple is a 24 tonne Ashtadhatu idol of Rishabhanatha seated on a 28 tonne lotus shaped Ashtadhatu pedestal. The Rishabhanatha idol is 24 feet (7.3 m) sitting in Padmasan posture. A statue of Mahavira weighing 71 tonne is also installed here. The temple structure similar to Akshardham, New Delhi, covering area of 4 acres (16,000 m^{2}). The pink colored sandstone from Rajasthan has been used for construction. Inauguration of statue of Bhagwan Aadinath and Sarvodaya Jain temple is held on 25-03-2023 by Jain Guruvar Vidyasagar Ji Maharaj, sasangh. Gajrath Panch kalyanak mahotsav is from 25 March to 2 April year 2023.

== Photo gallery ==
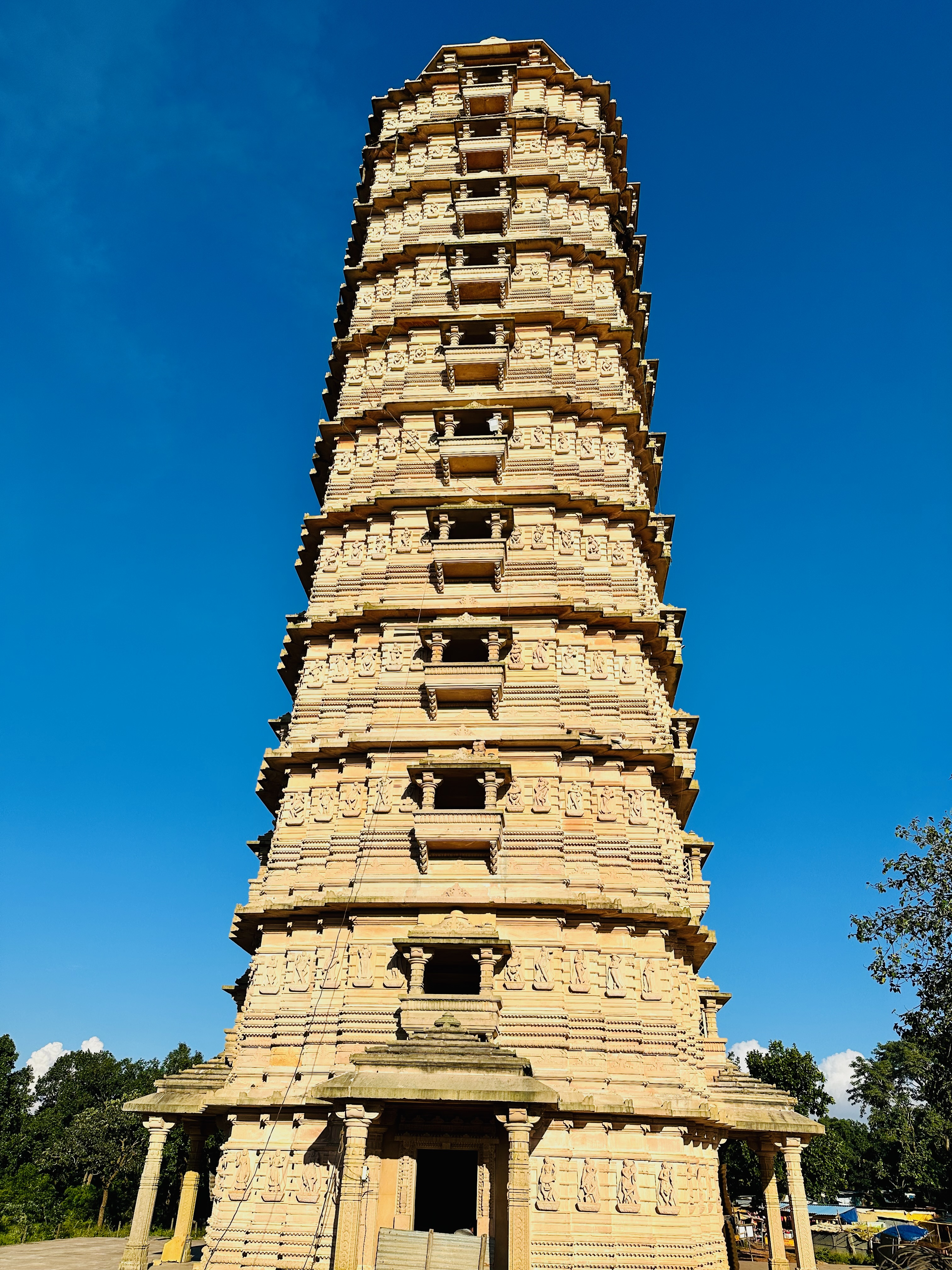
Sahasrakuta Jinalya

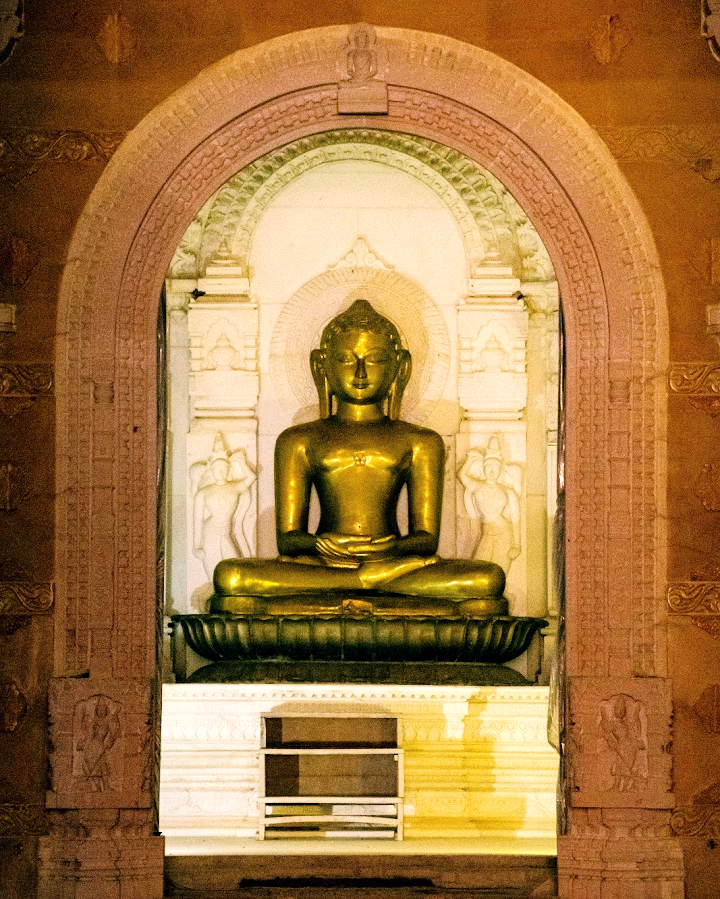
24 feet (7.3 m) Rishabhanatha idol

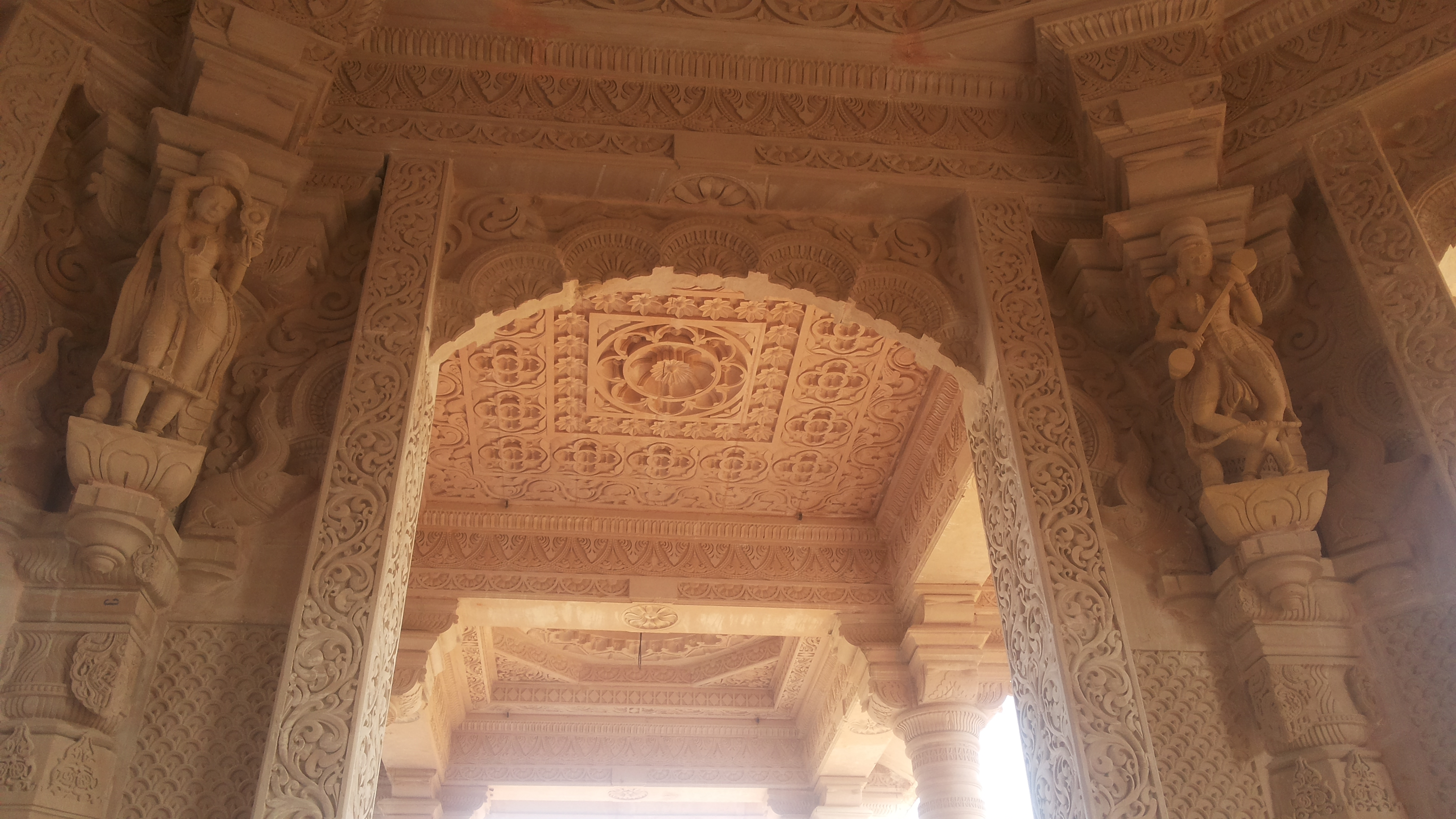
Carvings on temple wall and pillars

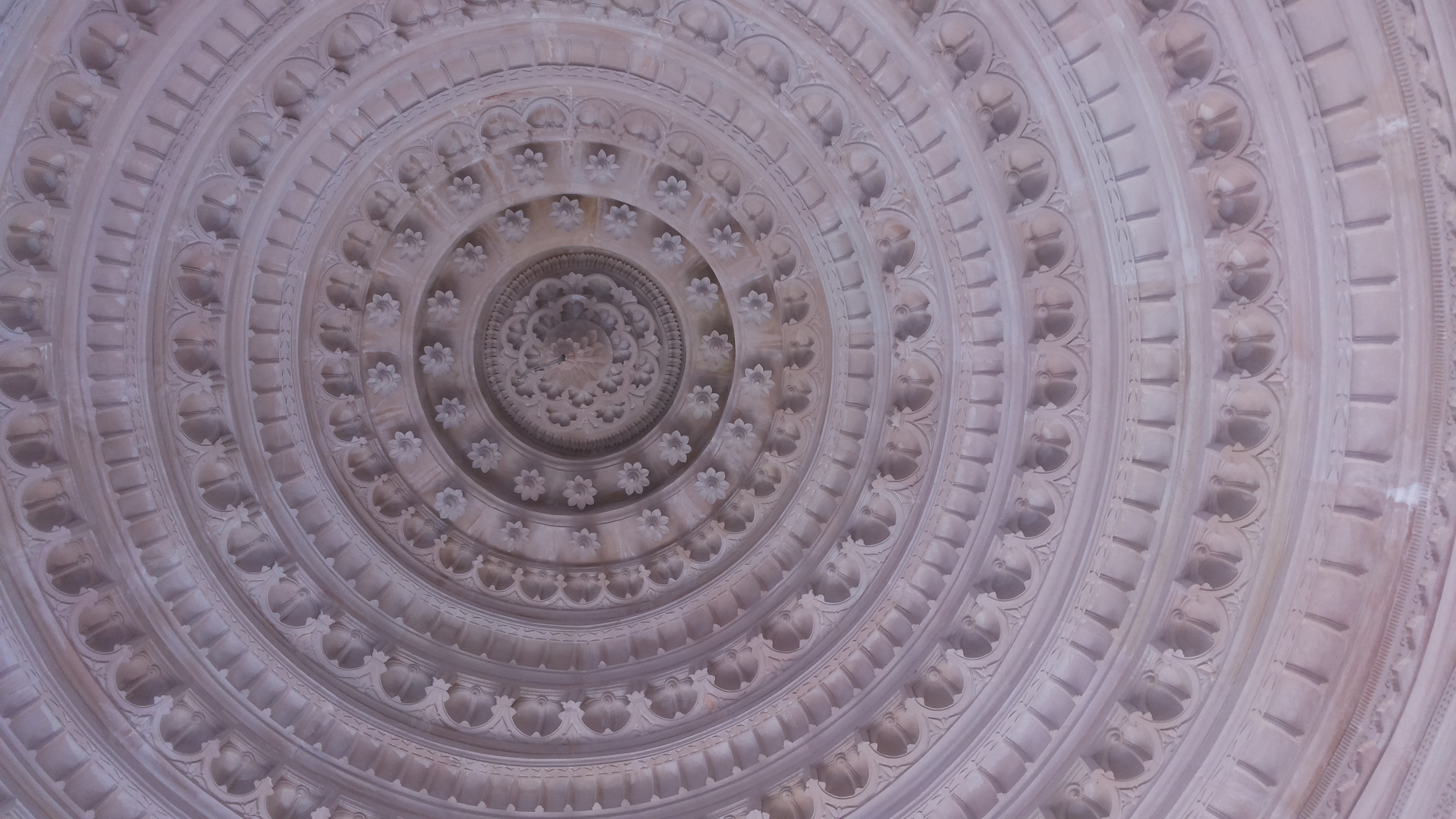
Dome

== See also ==
- Kundalpur
