= Kotma =

- city
- Location in Madhya Pradesh, India Kotma (India)
- Coordinates: 23.2°N 81.97°E
- Country: India
- State: Madhya Pradesh
- District: Anuppur

Government
  - Type: [Indian national Congress]
- Elevation: 517 m (1,696 ft)

Languages
  - Official: Hindi
- Time zone: UTC+5:30 (IST)
- PIN: 484334
- Telephone code: 07658
- Vehicle registration: MP-65

Kotma is a town and a municipality in Anuppur district in the Indian state of Madhya Pradesh.

== Demographics ==
As of 2001 India census, Kotma had a population of 88484. Males constitute 52.5% of the population and females 42.5%. Kotma has an average literacy rate of 67%, male literacy is 75.5%, and female literacy is 57.5%. In Kotma, 20% of the population is under 6 years of age.

== Geography ==
Kotma is located at 23.2°N 81.97°E. It has an average elevation of 517 metres. (1696 feet). It is the largest city in the district by area and population. It is also the oldest municipality in the district.
