= Jaithari =

Jaithari Jaithari thana
- Tehsil
- Location in Madhya Pradesh, India Jaithari (India)
- Coordinates: 23.043168°N 81.80377°E
- Country: India
- State: Madhya Pradesh
- District: Anuppur

Area
  - Total: 5 km^{2} (1.9 sq mi)
- Elevation: 490 m (1,610 ft)

Population (2001)
  - Total: 7,800

Languages
  - Official: Hindi and English
- Time zone: UTC+5:30 (IST)
- PIN: 484330
- Telephone code: 07659

Jaithari is a town and a tehsil in Anuppur district in the Indian state of Madhya Pradesh.

== Geography ==
Jaithari is located at 23.043168°N 81.80377°E. second largest tahsil of Anuppur district total villages 108 village '

== Demographics ==
As of the 2001 India census, the total population of Jaithari was 8,900, with 4,148 male and 3,752 female residents.

== Railway station ==
Jaithari can be accessed by Jaithari railway station, which is situated on Bilaspur–Katni line under Bilaspur railway division, part of the South East Central Railway zone.

== Locations within tehsil ==
Guwari, Murra Tola, Dhangwan, Chandpur are four main villages of Jaithari tehsil. The Son Nadi river flows through the tehsil and it is well known for the Jaithari Thermal Power Project (Moserbaer power plant) which opened in 2014.

The market of Jaithari town is famous for mangoes and tomatoes. Guwari is the main village of Jaithari town.

Guwari has Shukla family who established guwari and nearby village.
