= Anuppur =

- Town
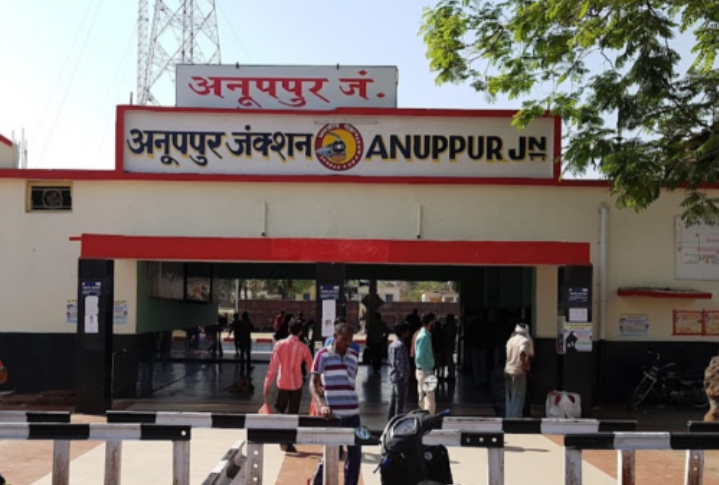
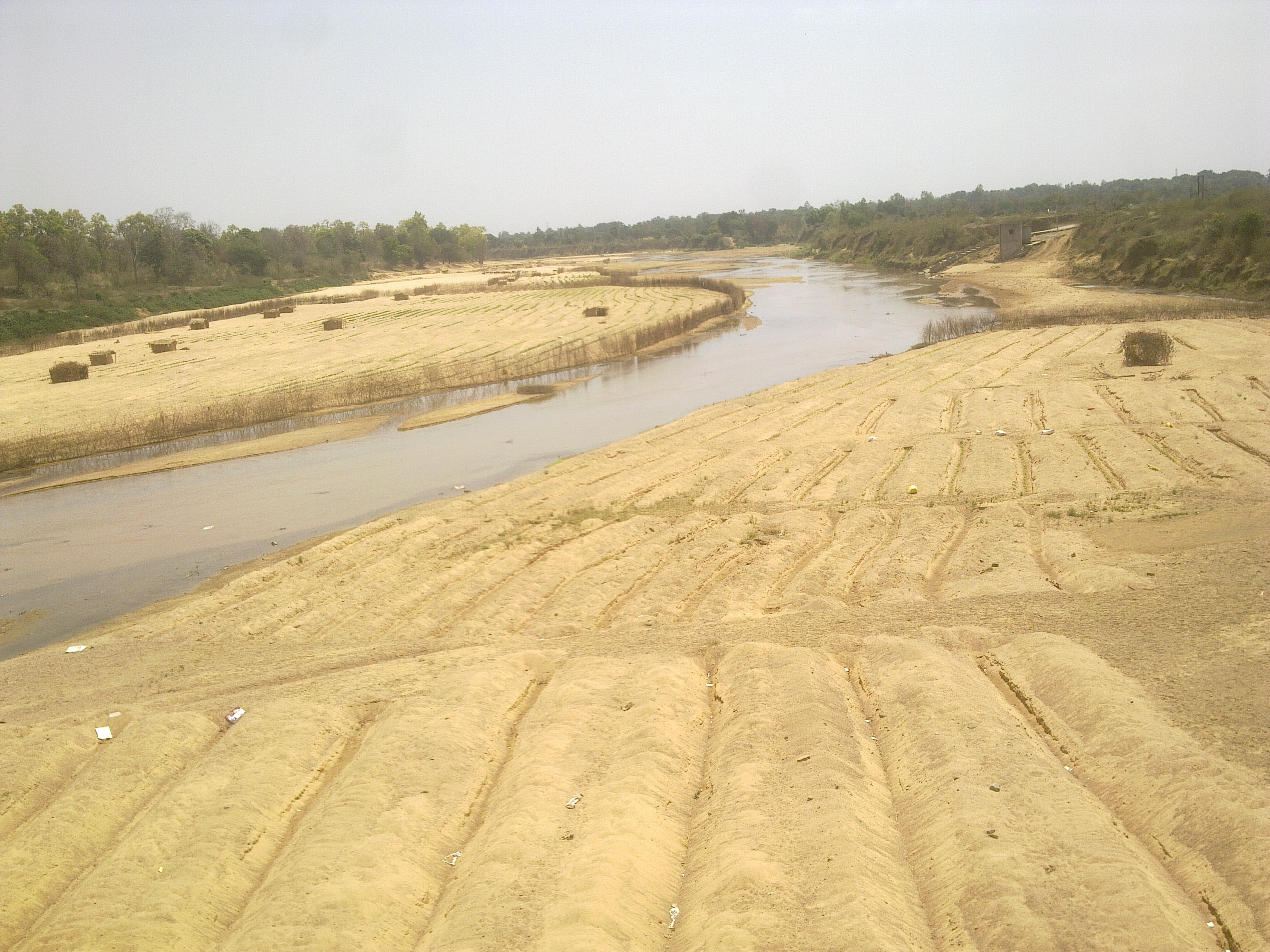
- Top: Anuppur Junction Railway Station; Bottem:Wotermelon farms near Anuppur

- Location in Madhya Pradesh, India
- Coordinates: 23.1°N 81.68°E
- Country: India
- State: Madhya Pradesh
- District: Anuppur

Government
  - Type: Nagar Palika Parishad
  - Body: Member of the Legislative Assembly (India)
  - District Magistrate: Ms.Sonia Meena IAS
- Elevation: 505 m (1,657 ft)

Population (2020)
  - Total: 26,397

Languages
  - Official: Hindi
- Time zone: UTC+5:30 (IST)
- PIN: 484224
- Telephone code: 07659
- Vehicle registration: MP-49
- Website: anuppur.nic.in

Anuppur is a city in northeastern Madhya Pradesh state of central India. It is the administrative headquarters of the Anuppur tehsil and Anuppur District. Previously, it was in the Shahdol District.

== History ==
Anuppur District is situated in the north-eastern part of Madhya Pradesh. It came into existence on August 15, 2003, when the Shahdol District was reorganized. Tribal houses in the area are made of mud, bamboo sticks, paddy straw and local tiles.

== Geography ==
Anuppur is located at 23.1°N 81.68°E. It has an average elevation of 505 metres (1,657 ft). The Son River and some of its tributaries run through Anuppur. According to the 2001 census, the total population of Anuppur District was 667,155, out of which 309,624 were scheduled tribes and 48,376 were scheduled castes. In this manner, Anuppur District is a tribal-dominated district. Kotma is the largest city/town and Municipality in Anuppur District.

== Demographics ==
During the 2011 census of India, Anuppur District had a population of 749,521. The population growth rate between 2001 and 2011 was 12.3%. Males constituted 52% of the population and females 48%.

== Government ==
Anuppur is one of the 230 Vidhan Sabha constituencies of Madhya Pradesh state. It is a segment of Shahdol's Lok Sabha constituency. As of 2023, its representative was Bisahulal Singh of the Bharatiya Janata Party.

== Points of interest ==
Points of interest in Anuppur include the Sarvodaya Jain temple, Shree Yantra, Narmada Udgam, and Mai ki Bagiya temples and the pilgrim town of Amarkantak.

== Transportation ==
Anuppur Junction is major railway station, connecting Anuppur to major cities such as Jabalpur, Bhopal, Indore, Sagar, Katni, Bilaspur, and Raipur.
