= National Commission on Agriculture =

National Commission on Agriculture was an Indian Government body that was created to find ways to increase agricultural productivity in India.

The Commission was founded in August 1970 under the Ministry of Agriculture. It released its final report in fifteen parts in 1976 under N. R. Mirdha. It recommended water management, development of a number of farm related sectors including subsidiary sectors and promoted skill development and research.
