= Khongsara =

Village in India

Coordinates: 22°32′N 81°56′E

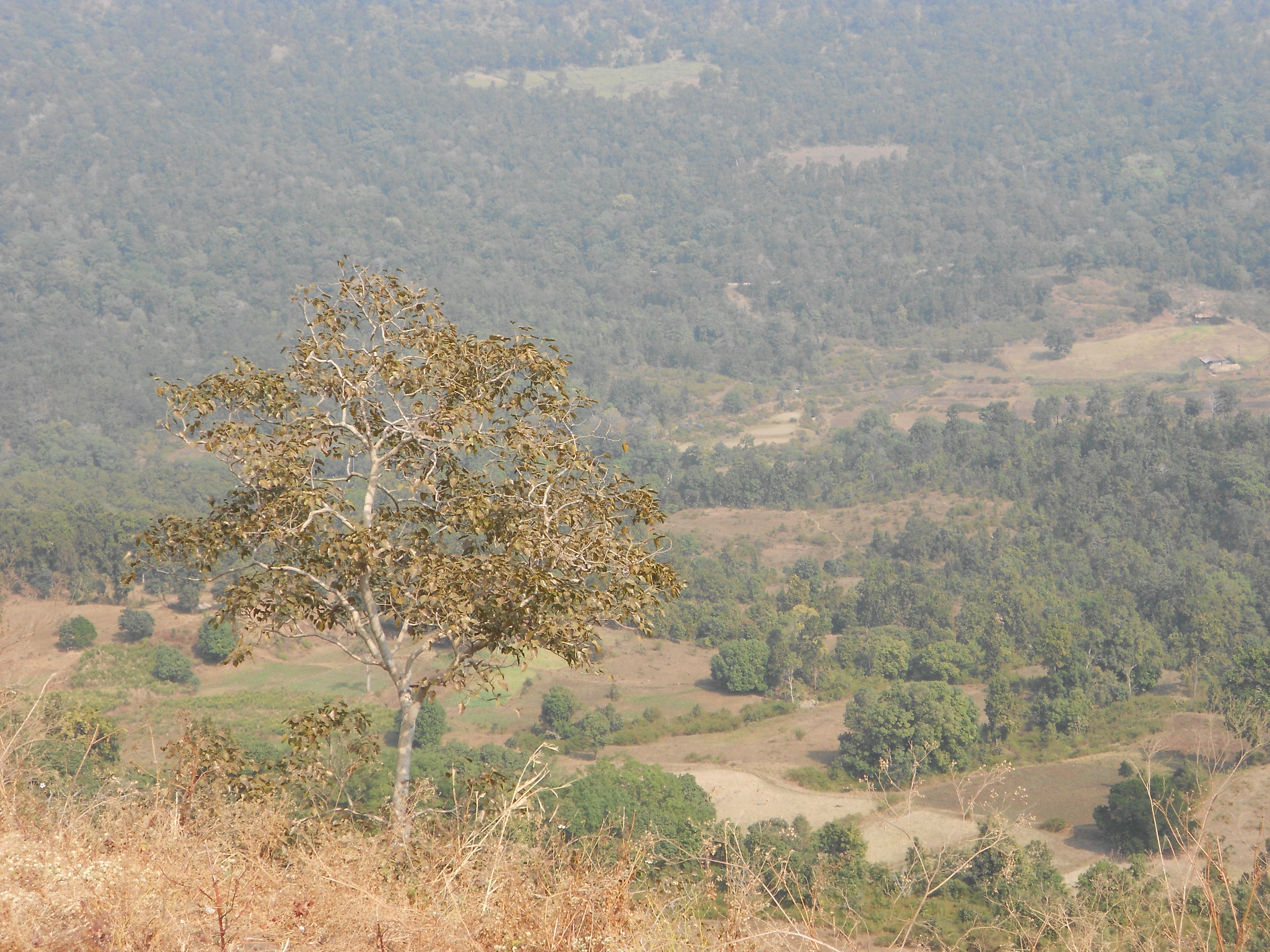
Aerial view of khongsara

Khongsara is a village in Kota Tehsil in Bilaspur District of Chhattisgarh, India. It is located (66 km by train and 86 by road) north from the district headquarters Bilaspur, and 166 km from the state capital Raipur.

Khongsara Pin code is 495116 and postal head office is Belgahana.

Khongsara is surrounded by Takhatpur Tehsil towards South, Bilaspur Tehsil towards South, Pali Tehsil towards East, Lormi Tehsil towards west.

Bilaspur, Bilaspur, Mungeli, Akaltara are the nearby cities to Khongsara.

== Demographics of Khongsara ==
Chhattisgarhi is the Local Language here. For more details follow census of 2011.

== Temples in Khongsara ==
- Shiv Mandir
- Khandoba Mandir
- Kaal Bhairav Mahdir
- Shiv Temple
- Mahamaya Devi Mandir

== Colleges in Khongsara, Kota ==
- Dr. C. V. Raman University
- Global Public School Kota
- Drona College of IT and Applied Social Science

== Schools in Khongsara ==
- LBD International School Kargiroad Kota
- Government Higher Secondary School
- Primary & Middle School
- Government Higher Secondary School
- Kasturba Gandhi School
