= Johilla River =

River in Madhya Pradesh, India

Coordinates: 23°38′42″N 81°14′11″E

Location
- Country: India
- State: Madhya Pradesh
- Region: Central India

Basin features
- River system: Sone River

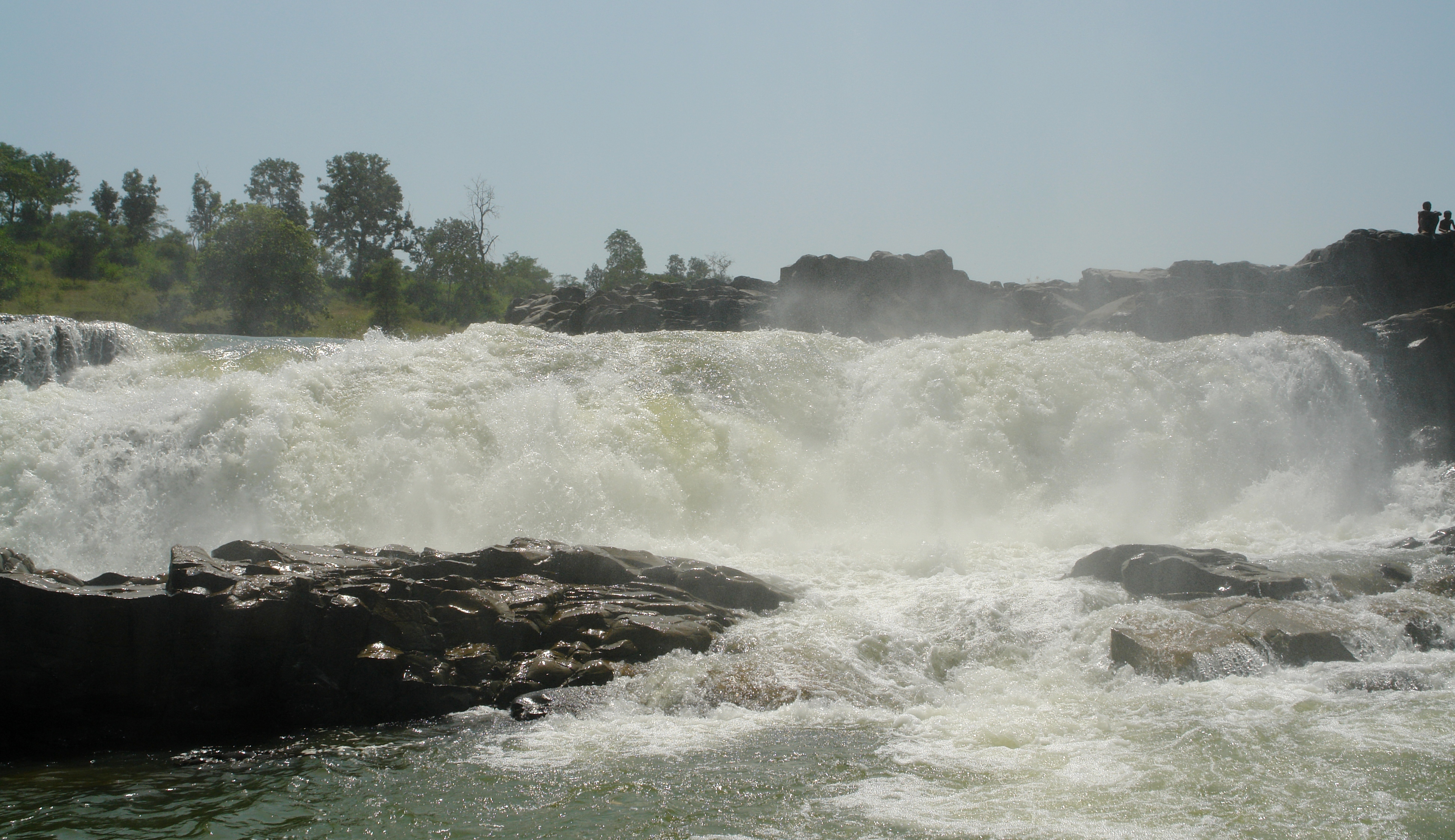
Waterfall on Johilla River

Johilla River is a river in Amarkantak, a pilgrim town in Madhya Pradesh, India. It is a tributary of the Son river, which is a perennial river located in Central India and is the second-largest southern tributary of the Ganges after the Yamuna River.
