= Ghutku =

Coordinates: 22°11′N 82°05′E

Ghutku is a town in Bilaspur district of Chhattisgarh state in central India. It is located nearly 9 km north-west of Bilaspur. Ghutku has a railway station on the Bilaspur–Anuppur route. Ghutku is the biggest village of Bilaspur district. Ghutku is situated on the Arpa River. The famous Mahamaya temple is located in Ghutku. The Ghutku primary school was established at 1865 according to the government record. Ghutku can be reached by train and by city bus.
