= Anuppur district =

- District
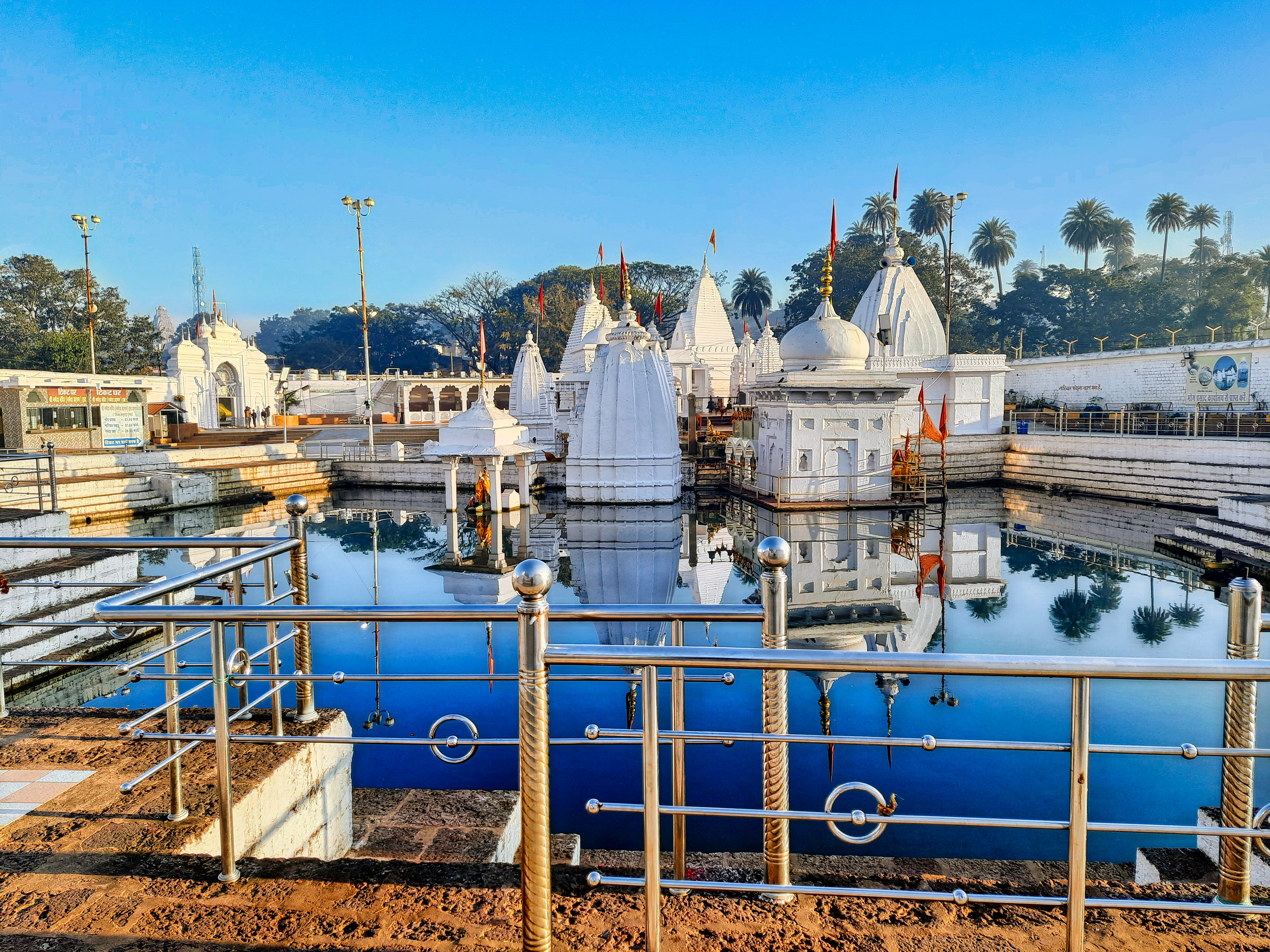
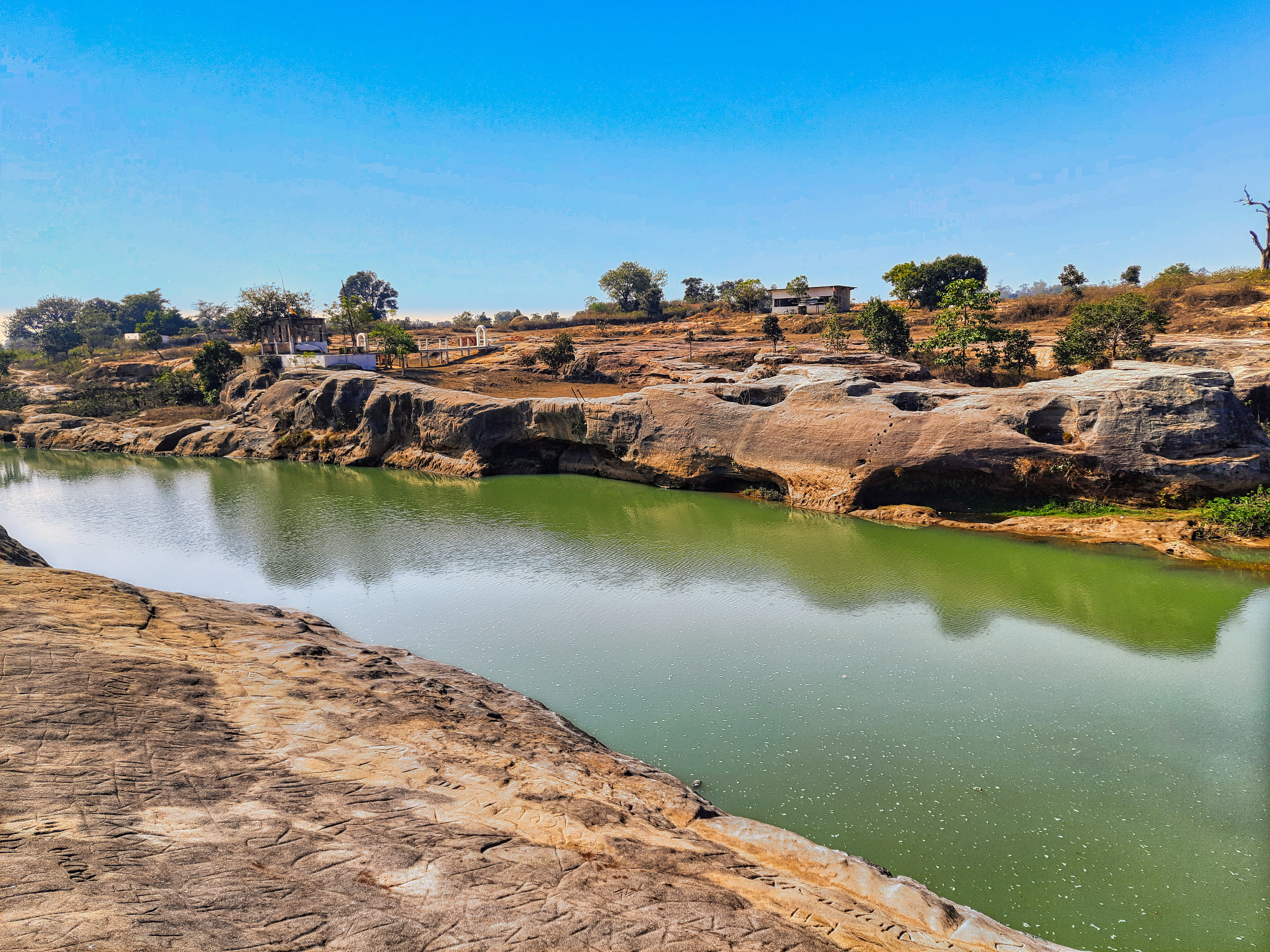
- Top: Narmada Kund at Amarkantak; Bottom: Silhara Caves

- Location of Anuppur district in Madhya Pradesh
- Country: India
- State: Madhya Pradesh
- Division: Shahdol
- Headquarters: Anuppur

Government
  - Lok Sabha constituencies: Shahdol

Area
  - Total: 3,746 km^{2} (1,446 sq mi)

Population (2011)
  - Total: 749,237
  - Density: 200.0/km^{2} (518.0/sq mi)

Demographics
  - Literacy: 69.08 per cent
  - Sex ratio: 975
- Time zone: UTC+05:30 (IST)
- Website: anuppur.nic.in

Anuppur district (अनूपपुर, Hindi pronunciation: [ən̪uːp.pʊɾ]) is an administrative district in Shahdol Division of Madhya Pradesh state in central India. Anuppur district is located in the southeastern part of Madhya Pradesh, India.

The district has an area of 3,701 km^{2} (1,429 sq mi), and a population of 749,237 (2011 Census). 309,624 people are from scheduled tribes and 48,376 are scheduled castes. The district is bordered by Manendragarh district of Chhattisgarh state on the east, Gaurela-Pendra-Marwahi district of Chhattisgarh on the southeast, Dindori District of Madhya Pradesh on the southwest, Umaria District of Madhya Pradesh on the west, and Shahdol District on the northwest and north. The administrative headquarters of the district is Anuppur.

The district has one Jawahar Navodaya Vidyalaya, and Indira Gandhi National Tribal University, a central university at Amarkantak.

Kotma is the largest town and oldest municipality in Anuppur district and also this town is mineral capital of Anuppur district.

The district was created on 15 August 2003 out of Shahdol District. It is part of Shahdol Division.

Anuppur district is mostly hilly and forested. The Narmada River originates from the hill of Amarkantak in the Maikal Hills, and the Sone River originates nearby. Almost the entirety of the district is in the Ganga basin, while a small portion in the south in the Narmada basin.

== Divisions ==
Anuppur District is divided into 4 revenue sub division.

Revenue Sub division are:

- Anuppur
- Kotma
- Jaithari
- Pushprajgarh

== Demographics ==
Historical population
Year	Pop.	±% p.a.
1901	128,297	—
1911	146,726	+1.35%
1921	136,290	−0.74%
1931	164,224	+1.88%
1941	187,591	+1.34%
1951	205,240	+0.90%
1961	249,115	+1.96%
1971	310,763	+2.24%
1981	418,833	+3.03%
1991	556,074	+2.87%
2001	667,155	+1.84%
2011	749,237	+1.17%

According to the 2011 census, Anuppur district has a population of 749,237, roughly equal to the nation of Guyana or the US state of Alaska. This gives it a ranking of 492nd in India (out of a total of 640). The district has a population density of 200 inhabitants per square kilometre (520/sq mi). Its population growth rate over the decade 2001-2011 was 12.35%. Anuppur has a sex ratio of 975 females for every 1000 males, and a literacy rate of 69.08%. 27.39% of the population lives in urban areas. Scheduled Castes and Tribes make up 9.92% and 47.85% of the population respectively. The largest tribal community is the Gonds.

Kotma is the biggest town (Municipality) in Anuppur District and Barbaspur (Chondi) near Bhaloo mada coal mines is the biggest village of the Anuppur district.

Religions in Anuppur district (2011)
Religion	Percent
Hinduism	91.63%
Other (tribal religion)	4.73%
Islam	2.87%
Other or not stated	0.77%

Hindus are 91.63%, Muslims are 2.87%. Other religions (traditional tribal religion) are 4.73%.

=== Languages ===
Languages of Anuppur district (2011)
1. Hindi (91.9%)
2. Bagheli (2.97%)
3. Gondi (2.23%)
4. Others (2.91%)

At the time of the 2011 Census of India, 91.89% of the population in the district spoke Hindi, 2.97% Bagheli and 2.23% Gondi as their first language.

== Tourist places ==
- Shree Sarvodaya Jain Temple Amarkantak
- Narmada Udgam Temple
- Shree Yantra Temple

== Economy ==
The economy of the district is mixed, industry, agriculture, and tourism are available in the district,

A few coal mines and thermal plants are operational in the district.Mines of Jamuna & Kotma Coal Area of South Eastern Coalfields are operated in the district. Some other major industry:

- Anuppur Thermal Power Project
- Amarkantak Thermal Power Station

Farming is also done on a large scale in the district. Here perennial rivers like Sone, Johila and Narmada provide water for irrigation throughout the year, paddy, maize, millet, wheat are the main crops here.

== Education ==
- Govt. Tulsi College
- Govt. I.T.I. College
- Govt. Polytechnic College
- Indira Gandhi National Tribal University, Amarkantak
- Jawahar Novodaya Vidyalaya
