= 2014 Indian general election in Madhya Pradesh =

Indian general election, 2014 in Madhya Pradesh
- 10, 17, 24 April 2014.

All 29 constituencies from Madhya Pradesh to the Lok Sabha
- Turnout: 61.61% (▲10.44%)

	Majority party	Minority party
Party	BJP	INC
Alliance	NDA	UPA
Last election	16 seats	12 seats
Seats won	27	2
Seat change	▲11	▼10
- Seatwise Result Map of the 2014 general election in Madhya Pradesh
Prime Minister before election
Manmohan Singh
INC
Prime Minister after election
Narendra Modi
BJP

The 2014 Indian general election in Madhya Pradesh were held for 29 seats in the state. The major two contenders in the state were Bharatiya Janta Party (BJP) and the Indian National Congress (INC). The voting process was held in three phases on 10, 17 and 24 April 2014.

== Parties and alliances ==
=== National Democratic Alliance ===
Party	Flag	Symbol	Leader	Seats contested
Bharatiya Janata Party			Shivraj Singh Chouhan	29

=== United Progressive Alliance ===
Party	Flag	Symbol	Leader	Seats contested
Indian National Congress			Kamal Nath	29

=== Others ===
Party	flag	Symbol	Leader	Seats contested
Bahujan Samaj Party			Mayawati	29
Samajwadi Party			Akhilesh Yadav	11

== List of Candidates ==
Constituency		BJP		INC		BSP	
#	Name	Party	Candidate	Party	Candidate	Party	Candidate
1	Morena	BJP	Anoop Mishra	INC	Govind Singh	BSP	Brindawan Singh Sikarwar
2	Bhind (SC)	BJP	Bhagirath Prasad	INC	Imarti Devi	BSP	Manish Katroliya
3	Gwalior	BJP	Narendra Singh Tomar	INC	Ashok Singh	BSP	Alok Sharma
4	Guna	BJP	Jaibhan Pawaiya	INC	Jyotiraditya Scindia	BSP	Lakhan Singh Baghel
5	Sagar	BJP	Laxmi Narayan Yadav	INC	Govind Singh Rajput	BSP	Saroj Katiyar Kurmi
6	Tikamgarh (SC)	BJP	Virendra Khatik	INC	Kamlesh Verma	BSP	Ahirwar Sewak Ram
7	Damoh	BJP	Prahlad Singh Patel	INC	Mahendra Pratap Singh	BSP	Devendra Chaourasia
8	Khajuraho	BJP	Nagendra Singh	INC	Raja Pateria	BSP	Ram Lakhan Singh
9	Satna	BJP	Ganesh Singh	INC	Ajay Singh	BSP	Dharmendra Tiwari
10	Rewa	BJP	Janardan Mishra	INC	Sundar Lal Tiwari	BSP	Deoraj Singh Patel
11	Sidhi	BJP	Riti Pathak	INC	Indrajeet Kumar	BSP	Rama Shankar Shahwal
12	Shahdol (ST)	BJP	Dalpat Paraste	INC	Rajesh Nandini Singh	BSP	Phool Singh Paraste
13	Jabalpur	BJP	Rakesh Singh	INC	Vivek Tankha	BSP	Aftab Alam
14	Mandla (ST)	BJP	Faggan Kulaste	INC	Omkar Markam	BSP	Shambhu Singh Maravi
15	Balaghat	BJP	Bodh Singh Bhagat	INC	Hina Kaware	BSP	Yogesh Nanaji Samrite
16	Chhindwara	BJP	Chandrabhan Singh Ch.	INC	Kamal Nath	BSP	Nitinkumar Sahu
17	Hoshangabad	BJP	Uday Pratap Singh	INC	Devendra Patel	BSP	Pradeep Ahirwar
18	Vidisha	BJP	Sushma Swaraj	INC	Lakshman Singh	BSP	Amar Singh Patel
19	Bhopal	BJP	Alok Sanjar	INC	P. C. Sharma	BSP	Sunil Borse
20	Rajgarh	BJP	Rodmal Nagar	INC	Amlabe Narayan Singh	BSP	Shivnarayan Verma
21	Dewas (SC)	BJP	Manohar Untwal	INC	Sajjan Singh Verma	BSP	Gokul Prasad Dongare
22	Ujjain (SC)	BJP	Chintamani Malviya	INC	Premchand Guddu	BSP	Ramprasad Jatwa
23	Mandsour	BJP	Sudhir Gupta	INC	Meenakshi Natarajan	BSP	Kranti Parivartan
24	Ratlam (ST)	BJP	Dileep Bhuria	INC	Kantilal Bhuria	BSP	Babusingh
25	Dhar (ST)	BJP	Savitri Thakur	INC	Umang Singhar	BSP	Ajay Rawat
26	Indore	BJP	Sumitra Mahajan	INC	Satyanarayan Patel	BSP	Dharamdas Ahirwar
27	Khargone (ST)	BJP	Subhash Patel	INC	Ramesh Patel	BSP	Naharsingh Barde
28	Khandwa	BJP	Nandkumar Chauhan	INC	Arun Yadav	BSP	Sanjay Laxman Solanki
29	Betul (ST)	BJP	Jyoti Dhurve	INC	Ajay Shah Makrai	BSP	Sohan Lal Uikey

== Election schedule ==
Poll event	Phase		
Poll event	I	II	III
Notification date	15 March 2014	19 March 2014	29 March 2014
Last date for filing the nomination	22 March 2014	26 March 2014	5 April 2014
Date of Scrutiny	24 March 2014	27 March 2014	7 April 2014
Last date for withdrawal of nomination	26 March 2014	29 March 2014	9 April 2014
Date of poll	10 April 2014	17 April 2014	24 April 2014
Date of counting	16 May 2014		

Voting Phases
I (9 seats)	II (10 seats)	III (10 seats)
Satna; Rewa; Sidhi; Shahdol; Jabalpur; Balaghat; Mandla; Chhindwara; Hoshangabad	Morena; Bhind; Gwalior; Guna; Sagar; Tikamgarh; Damoh; Khajuraho; Bhopal; Rajgarh	Vidisha; Dewas; Ujjain; Mandsour; Ratlam; Dhar; Indore; Khargone; Khandwa; Betul

== Result ==
=== Results by Party ===
Party Name	Popular vote			Seats		
Party Name	Votes	%	±pp	Contested	Won	+/−
BJP	1,60,15,695	54.03		29	27	
INC	1,03,40,274	34.89		29	2	
BSP	11,24,772	3.79		29	0	
AAP	3,49,488	1.18		29	0	
SP	2,21,306	0.75		11	0	
GGP	1,69,453	0.57		12	0	
CPI	96,683	0.33		5	0	
Others	3,81,432	1.29	Steady	108	0	Steady
IND	5,48,867	1.85		126	0	Steady
NOTA	3,91,837	1.32	Steady			
Total	2,96,39,807	100%	-	378	29	-

=== Constituency-wise results ===
Keys: BJP (27) INC (2)

Constituency		Winner				Runner-up				Margin	
Constituency		Candidate	Party	Votes	%	Candidate	Party	Votes	%	Votes	%
1	Morena	Anoop Mishra	BJP	375,567	43.96	Brindawan Singh Sikarwar	BSP	2,42,586	28.40	1,32,981	15.56
2	Bhind	Dr. Bhagirath Prasad	BJP	404,474	55.46	Imarti Devi	INC	244,513	33.52	159,961	21.94
3	Gwalior	Narendra Singh Tomar	BJP	442,796	44.68	Ashok Singh	INC	413,097	41.68	29,699	3.00
4	Guna	Jyotiraditya M. Scindia	INC	517,036	52.89	Jaibhansingh Pawaiya	BJP	396,244	40.53	120,792	12.36
5	Sagar	Laxmi Narayan Yadav	BJP	482,580	54.10	Govind Singh Rajput	INC	361,843	40.57	120,737	13.53
6	Tikamgarh	Virendra Kumar	BJP	422,979	55.16	Kamlesh Verma Ahirwar	INC	214,248	27.94	208,731	27.22
7	Damoh	Prahalad Singh Patel	BJP	513,079	56.14	Mahendra Pratap Singh	INC	299,780	32.80	213,299	23.34
8	Khajuraho	Nagendra Singh	BJP	474,966	54.31	Raja Pateria	INC	227,476	26.01	247,490	28.30
9	Satna	Ganesh Singh	BJP	375,288	41.08	Ajay Singh	INC	366,600	40.13	8,688	0.95
10	Rewa	Janardan Mishra	BJP	383,320	46.17	Sunderlal Tiwari	INC	214,594	25.85	168,726	20.32
11	Sidhi	Riti Pathak	BJP	475,678	48.07	Indrajeet Kumar	INC	367,632	37.15	108,046	10.92
12	Shahdol	Dalpat Singh Paraste	BJP	525,419	54.22	Rajes Nandini Singh	INC	284,118	29.32	241,301	24.90
13	Jabalpur	Rakesh Singh	BJP	564,609	56.34	Vivek Krishna Tankha	INC	355,970	35.52	208,639	20.82
14	Mandla	Faggan Kulaste	BJP	585,720	48.06	Omkar Markam	INC	475,251	39.00	110,469	9.06
15	Balaghat	Bodh Singh Bhagat	BJP	480,594	43.17	Hina Kaware	INC	384,553	34.54	96,041	8.63
16	Chhindwara	Kamal Nath	INC	559,755	50.54	Chandrabhan Chaudhary	BJP	443,218	40.01	116,537	10.53
17	Hoshangabad	Uday Pratap Singh	BJP	669,128	64.85	Devendra Patel	INC	279,168	27.06	389,960	37.79
18	Vidisha	Sushma Swaraj	BJP	714,348	66.53	Lakshman Singh	INC	303,650	28.28	410,698	38.25
19	Bhopal	Alok Sanjar	BJP	714,178	63.19	P. C. Sharma	INC	343,482	30.39	370,696	32.80
20	Rajgarh	Rodmal Nagar	BJP	596,727	59.03	Amlabe Narayan Singh	INC	367,990	36.41	228,737	22.62
21	Dewas	Manohar Untwal	BJP	665,646	58.18	Sajjan Singh Verma	INC	405,333	35.43	260,313	22.75
22	Ujjain	Chintamani Malviya	BJP	641,101	63.07	Premchand Guddu	INC	331,438	32.61	309,663	30.46
23	Mandsaur	Sudhir Gupta	BJP	698,335	60.12	Meenakshi Natarajan	INC	394,686	33.98	303,649	26.14
24	Ratlam	Dileep Singh Bhuria	BJP	545,980	50.41	Kantilal Bhuria	INC	437,523	40.39	108,457	10.02
25	Dhar	Savitri Thakur	BJP	558,387	51.84	Umang Singhar	INC	454,059	42.16	104,328	9.68
26	Indore	Sumitra Mahajan	BJP	854,972	64.92	Satyanarayan Patel	INC	388,071	29.47	466,901	35.45
27	Khargone	Subhash Patel	BJP	649,354	56.33	Ramesh Patel	INC	391,475	33.96	257,879	22.37
28	Khandwa	Nandkumar Chauhan	BJP	717,357	57.04	Arun Yadav	INC	457,643	36.39	259,714	20.65
29	Betul	Jyoti Dhurve	BJP	643,651	61.43	Ajay Shah Makrai	INC	315,037	30.07	328,614	31.36

== Bye-elections ==
Constituency			Winner				Runner Up				Margin
No.	Name	Date	Candidate	Party	Votes	%	Candidate	Party	Votes	%	Margin
12	Shahdol (ST)	22 Nov 2016	Gyan Singh	BJP	481,398	44.43	Himadri Singh	INC	421,015	38.86	60,383
12	Shahdol (ST)	22 Nov 2016	The Shahdol Lok Sabha bypoll was held following the death of the incumbent MP, Dalpat Singh Paraste.								
24	Ratlam (ST)	24 Nov 2015	Kantilal Bhuria	INC	536,743	50.19	Nirmala Bhuria	BJP	447,911	41.88	88,832
24	Ratlam (ST)	24 Nov 2015	The Ratlam Lok Sabha bypoll was held following the death of the incumbent MP, Kantilal Bhuria.								

== Post-election Union Council of Ministers from Madhya Pradesh ==
=== Cabinet Ministers ===
S No.	Minister	Party	Lok Sabha Seat/Rajya Sabha	Portfolios	Term Start	Term End
1.	Sushma Swaraj	Bharatiya Janata Party	Vidisha	Minister of External Affairs	27 May 2014	30 May 2019
1.	Sushma Swaraj	Bharatiya Janata Party	Vidisha	Minister of Overseas Indian Affairs	27 May 2014	7 Jan 2016
2.	Narendra Singh Tomar	Bharatiya Janata Party	Gwalior	Minister of Labour and Employment	27 May 2014	9 Nov 2014
2.	Narendra Singh Tomar	Bharatiya Janata Party	Gwalior	Minister of Mines	27 May 2014	5 July 2016
2.	Narendra Singh Tomar	Bharatiya Janata Party	Gwalior	Minister of Steel	27 May 2014	5 July 2016
2.	Narendra Singh Tomar	Bharatiya Janata Party	Gwalior	Minister of Rural Development	5 July 2016	30 May 2019
2.	Narendra Singh Tomar	Bharatiya Janata Party	Gwalior	Minister of Panchayati Raj	5 July 2016	30 May 2019
2.	Narendra Singh Tomar	Bharatiya Janata Party	Gwalior	Minister of Drinking Water and Sanitation	5 July 2016	3 Sept 2017
2.	Narendra Singh Tomar	Bharatiya Janata Party	Gwalior	Minister of Housing and Urban Affairs	17 July 2017	3 Sept 2017
2.	Narendra Singh Tomar	Bharatiya Janata Party	Gwalior	Minister of Parliamentary Affairs	13 Nov 2018	30 May 2019
3.	Najma Heptulla	Bharatiya Janata Party	Rajya Sabha	Minister of Minority Affairs	27 May 2014	12 July 2016
4.	Thawar Chand Gehlot	Bharatiya Janata Party	Rajya Sabha	Minister of Social Justice and Empowerment	27 May 2014	30 May 2019
5.	Prakash Javadekar	Bharatiya Janata Party	Rajya Sabha	Minister of Environment, Forest and Climate Change	27 May 2014	5 July 2016
5.	Prakash Javadekar	Bharatiya Janata Party	Rajya Sabha	Minister of Information and Broadcasting	27 May 2014	9 Nov 2014
5.	Prakash Javadekar	Bharatiya Janata Party	Rajya Sabha	Minister of Human Resource Development	5 July 2016	30 May 2019
6.	Anil Madhav Dave	Bharatiya Janata Party	Rajya Sabha	Minister of Environment, Forest and Climate Change	5 July 2016	18 May 2017

=== Minister of State ===
S No.	Minister	Party	Lok Sabha Seat/Rajya Sabha	Portfolios	Term Start	Term End
1.	Prakash Javadekar	Bharatiya Janata Party	Rajya Sabha	Minister of State in the Ministry of Parliamentary Affairs	27 May 2014	9 Nov 2014
2.	Faggan Singh Kulaste	Bharatiya Janata Party	Mandla	Minister of State in the Ministry of Health and Family Welfare	5 July 2016	3 Sept 2017
3.	Virendra Kumar Khatik	Bharatiya Janata Party	Tikamgarh	Minister of State in the Ministry of Minority Affairs	3 Sept 2017	30 May 2019
3.	Virendra Kumar Khatik	Bharatiya Janata Party	Tikamgarh	Minister of State in the Ministry of Women and Child Development	3 Sept 2017	30 May 2019
4.	M. J. Akbar	Bharatiya Janata Party	Rajya Sabha	Minister of State in the Ministry of External Affairs	5 July 2016	17 Oct 2018

== Region-wise results ==
Region	Total seats	Bharatiya Janata Party		Indian National Congress		Bahujan Samaj Party		Others
Baghelkhand	8	8	▲2	0	▼1	0	▼1	0
Bhopal Division	3	3	▲1	0	▼1	0	Steady	0
Chambal	4	3	Steady	1	Steady	0	Steady	0
Mahakaushal	5	4	▲2	1	▼2	0	Steady	0
Malwa	4	4	▲3	0	▼3	0	Steady	0
Nimar	5	5	▲3	0	▼3		Steady	
Total	29	27	▲11	2	▼10	0	▼1	0

== Assembly segments wise lead of Parties ==
Party	Assembly segments	Position in Assembly (as of 2018 election)
Bharatiya Janata Party	192	109
Indian National Congress	36	114
Bahujan Samaj Party	2	2
Others	0	5
Total	230	
