= Umaria (disambiguation) =

Umaria is a city in India. Umaria may also refer to:

- Umaria Sinhawansa (born 1991), Sri Lankan singer
- Umaria district, district in India
- Umaria Coalfield, coalfield in India
