= Damoy =

Coordinates: 23.971°N 81.003°E

Damoy village is located to the North East of Umaria district of Madhya Pradesh. The nearby villages are Indwar, Bharewa, Mugwani, Ashodh, Chandwar, Chinsura, Baturawah, Surtan, Bholgarh etc.

This village is well connected with nearby city Katni, Jabalpur, Shahdol, Satna, Rewa, Allahabad via Singrauli but the road connectivity with surrounding town Umaria, Shahdol, Rewa is not good. Road transport is connecting to all nearby village and the frequency of public transport very less, thus the villager’s uses their personal vehicle, Cycle, Motor Cycle to visit all nearby villages.

The Bandhavgarh National Park and Panpatha Wildlife Sanctuary are very close this village. Bandhavgarh National Park is one of the wild life sanctuaries in the Indian state Madhya Pradesh, situated at 197 km away north-east of Jabalpur and 25 km from Damoy village.

Agriculture is the main source of earning of maximum portion villagers, balanced are with government/private services. Education percentage is also quite good, Damoy has three Government Primary School, One Government Middle School and One private Amar Jyoti High School.

Agriculture products include rice, wheat, tuar, udad, sarso, gram, soyabean etc. Principal fauna is tiger, panthers, jackal, wild dog, monkey, chital, sambhar, bear and various species of birds. Principal flora includes sal, sagon, saja, bija, dhawda, khair, bel, acacia, mahua, bamboo.

Trains passing through Damoy Railway Station (DMYA)

| Train No. | Train Name | Origin | Arrival | Departure | Mon | Tue | Wed | Thu | Fri | Sat | Sun |
|---|---|---|---|---|---|---|---|---|---|---|---|
| 51117 | Katni Chopan Mix Passenger | Katni Junction | 12:06 | 12:07 | Yes | Yes | Yes | Yes | Yes | Yes | Yes |
| 51118 | Chopan Katni Passenger | Chopan | 13:43 | 13:44 | Yes | Yes | Yes | Yes | Yes | Yes | Yes |
| 51675 | Katni Chopan Fast Passenger | Katni Junction | 22:33 | 22:34 | Yes | Yes | Yes | Yes | Yes | Yes | Yes |
| 51676 | Chopan Katni Passenger | Chopan | 05:14 | 05:15 | Yes | Yes | Yes | Yes | Yes | Yes | Yes |
