= Manpur Assembly constituency =

Constituency of the Madhya Pradesh legislative assembly in India

Coordinates: 22.43°N 75.62°E

Manpur
- Constituency No. 90 for the Madhya Pradesh Legislative Assembly

Constituency details
- Country: India
- Region: Central India
- State: Madhya Pradesh
- District: Umaria
- Lok Sabha constituency: Shahdol
- Established: 2008
- Reservation: ST

Member of Legislative Assembly
- 16th Madhya Pradesh Legislative Assembly
- Incumbent Meena Singh
- Party: Bharatiya Janata Party
- Elected year: 2023

Manpur is one of the 230 Vidhan Sabha (Legislative Assembly) constituencies of Madhya Pradesh state in central India.

The constituency was created in 2008 and it comprises Manpur tehsil and Pali tehsil, both in Umaria district. As of 2023, it is represented by Meena Singh of the Bharatiya Janata Party.

== Members of the Legislative Assembly ==
Election	Name	Party
2008	Meena Singh	Bharatiya Janata Party
2013	Meena Singh	Bharatiya Janata Party
2018	Meena Singh	Bharatiya Janata Party
2023	Meena Singh	Bharatiya Janata Party

== Election results ==
=== 2023 ===
2023 Madhya Pradesh Legislative Assembly election: Manpur
Party	Candidate	Votes	%	±%
BJP	Meena Singh	86,089	44.25	−2.65
INC	Tilak Raj Singh	60,824	31.26	−5.01
GGP	Radhe Shyam Kukodiya	28,839	14.82	+11.8
AAP	Usha Kol	5,936	3.05	+2.49
Peoples Party Of India (Democratic)	Rajendra Baiga	2,323	1.19	
NOTA	None of the above	3,402	1.75	−1.28
Majority		25,265	12.99	+2.36
Turnout		194,555	77.7	+0.63
BJP hold		Swing		

=== 2018 ===
2018 Madhya Pradesh Legislative Assembly election: Manpur
Party	Candidate	Votes	%	±%
BJP	Meena Singh	82,287	46.9	
INC	Gyanvati Singh	63,632	36.27	
BSP	Rekha Kol	9,243	5.27	
GGP	Devlal Singh Tekam	5,291	3.02	
Independent	Ramprasad Baiga	2,523	1.44	
Sapaks Party	Annu Kol	2,277	1.3	
Independent	Shyamlal Baiga	2,158	1.23	
NOTA	None of the above	5,320	3.03	
Majority		18,655	10.63	
Turnout		175,461	77.07	
BJP hold		Swing		

== See also ==
- Manpur, Umaria
