= Bandhavgarh Assembly constituency =

Constituency of the Madhya Pradesh legislative assembly in India

Coordinates: 23.77°N 81.02°E

Bandhavgarh
- Constituency No. 89 for the Madhya Pradesh Legislative Assembly

Constituency details
- Country: India
- Region: Central India
- State: Madhya Pradesh
- District: Umaria
- Lok Sabha constituency: Shahdol
- Established: 1957
- Reservation: ST

Member of Legislative Assembly
- 16th Madhya Pradesh Legislative Assembly
- Incumbent Shivnarayan Singh
- Party: Bharatiya Janata Party
- Elected year: 2023
- Preceded by: Gyan Singh

Bandhavgarh is one of the 230 constituencies of Madhya Pradesh Legislative Assembly. It is a segment of Shahdol Lok Sabha constituency.

== Members of the Legislative Assembly ==
Election	Name	Party
1957	Chhotelal	Indian National Congress
1962	Mishrilal	Socialist Party
1967-2008 : Constituency dissolved
2008	Gyan Singh	Bharatiya Janata Party
2013	Gyan Singh	Bharatiya Janata Party
2017^	Shivnarayan Singh	Bharatiya Janata Party
2018	Shivnarayan Singh	Bharatiya Janata Party
2023	Shivnarayan Singh	Bharatiya Janata Party

^ bypoll

== Election results ==
=== 2023 ===
2023 Madhya Pradesh Legislative Assembly election: Bandhavgarh
Party	Candidate	Votes	%	±%
BJP	Shivnarayan Singh	89,954	49.51	+12.85
INC	Savitri Singh Dhurve	66,243	36.46	+2.22
GGP	Bala Singh Tekam	16,940	9.32	+3.21
NOTA	None of the above	3,243	1.78	−1.34
Majority		23,711	13.05	+10.63
Turnout		181,700	79.3	+1.33
BJP hold		Swing		

=== 2018 ===
2018 Madhya Pradesh Legislative Assembly election: Bandhavgarh
Party	Candidate	Votes	%	±%
BJP	Shivnarayan Singh	59,158	36.66	
INC	Dhyan Singh	55,255	34.24	
Independent	Satilal Bega	18,663	11.57	
GGP	Ram Milan Baiga	9,854	6.11	
BSP	Shivprasad Kol	6,936	4.3	
Sapaks Party	Saraju Kol	2,981	1.85	
NOTA	None of the above	5,037	3.12	
Majority		3,903	2.42	
Turnout		161,370	77.97	
BJP hold		Swing		

== See also ==
- Bandhavgarh
- Umaria district
- Shahdol (Lok Sabha constituency)
