= Shivnarayan Singh =

Indian politician (born 1980)

Shivnarayan Gyan Singh (born 2 October 1980) is an Indian politician from Madhya Pradesh. He is an MLA from Bandhavgarh Assembly constituency, which is reserved for Scheduled Tribe community, in Umaria District. He won the 2023 Madhya Pradesh Legislative Assembly election, representing the Bharatiya Janata Party.

== Early life and education ==
Singh is from Bandhavgarh, Umaria District, Madhya Pradesh. He is the son of Gyan Singh. He passed Class 12 in 2005 at Higher Secondary College, Madwas and later did B.A. through open stream from Madhya Pradesh Open University, Bhopal in 2008.

== Career ==
Singh won from Bandhavgarh Assembly constituency in the 2023 Madhya Pradesh Legislative Assembly election representing Bharatiya Janata Party. He polled 89,954 votes and defeated his nearest rival, Savitri Singh Dhurve of the Indian National Congress, by a margin of 23,711 votes. He first became an MLA winning the 2017 by election caused due to the resignation of his father Gyan Singh, who was elected to the Lok Sabha. He then retained the seat in the 2018 Madhya Pradesh Legislative Assembly election. Earlier, he was a member of the Umaria district panchayat.
