= 4th Lok Sabha =

Lower house Members elected in 1967

←	3rd	5th	→
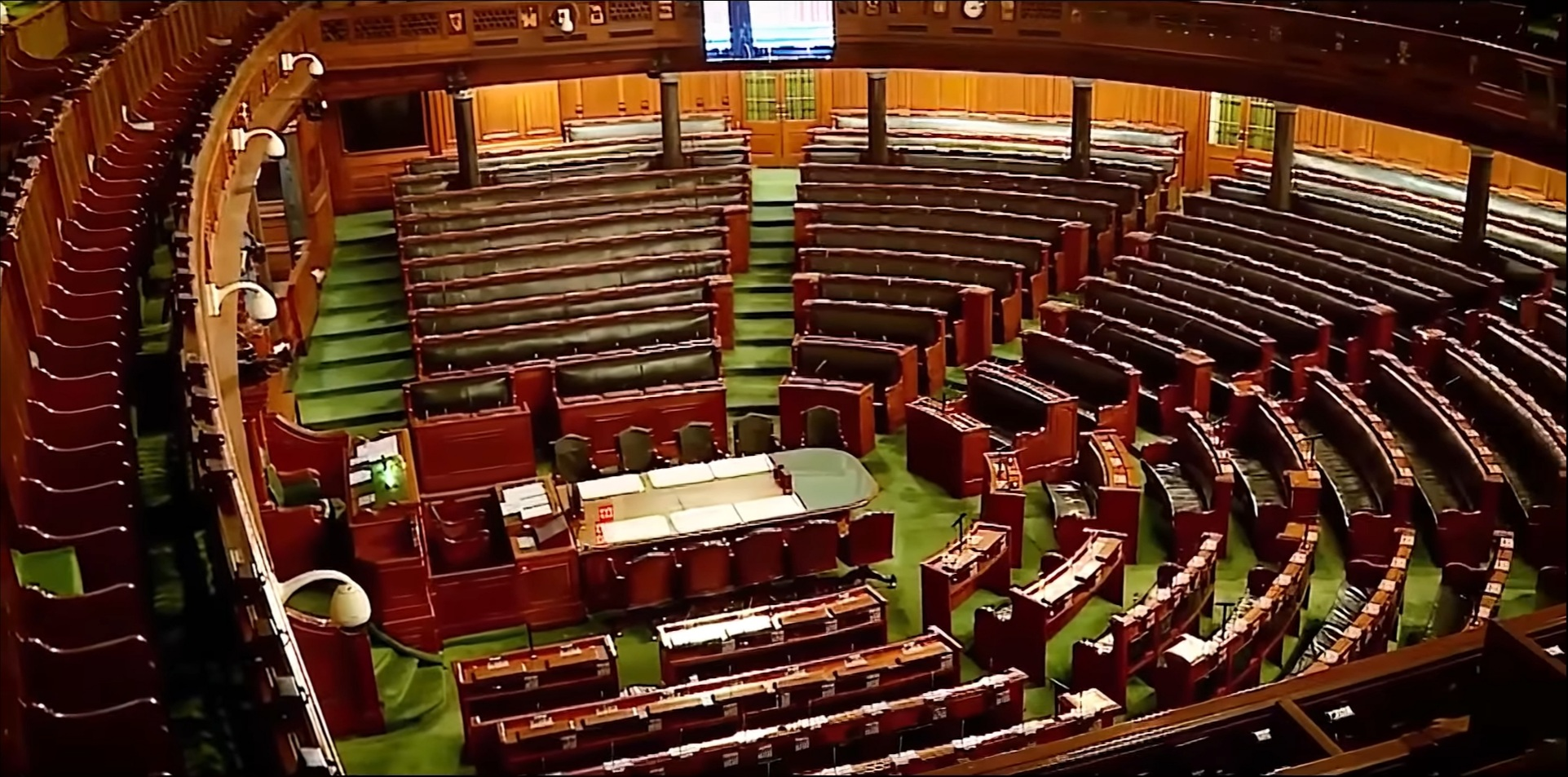
- View of Lok Sabha chamber in the Old Parliament House, New Delhi

Overview
- Legislative body: Indian Parliament
- Election: 1967 Indian general election

The 4th Lok Sabha was in session from 4 March 1967 to 27 December 1970. Its members were elected in February and March 1967. 13 sitting members from the Rajya Sabha were elected to the 4th Lok Sabha in the general election.

Indira Gandhi was again the Prime Minister, as in the 3rd Lok Sabha. Her premiership would continue into the following Lok Sabha, the 5th, which was constituted after the 1971 Indian general election.

== Important members ==
- Speaker:
  - Neelam Sanjiva Reddy from 17 March 1967 to 19 July 1969
  - Gurdial Singh Dhillon from 8 August 1969 to 19 March 1971
- Deputy Speaker:
  - Raghunath Keshav Khadilkar from 28 March 1967 to 1 November 1969
  - George Gilbert Swell from 9 December 1969 to 27 December 1970
- Secretary General:
  - S. L. Shakdhar from 2 September 1964 to 18 June 1977

== Membership by political party ==
4th Lok Sabha Party Name	Code	Number of MP's (total 520)
Indian National Congress	INC	283
Swatantra Party	SP	44
Bharatiya Jana Sangh	BJS	35
Dravida Munnetra Kazhagam	DMK	25
Samyukta Socialist Party	SSP	23
Communist Party of India	CPI	23
Communist Party of India (Marxist)	CPI(M)	19
Praja Socialist Party	PSP	13
Bangla Congress	BC	5
Akali Dal – Sant Fateh Singh	ADS	3
All India Forward Bloc	AIFB	2
Indian Union Muslim League	IUML	2
Peasants and Workers Party of India	PWPI	2
Republican Party of India	RPI	1
United Goans (Sequiera Group)	UG(S)	1
Jana Kranti Dal	JKD	1
Jammu & Kashmir National Conference	NC	1
Independents	-	35
Nominated Anglo-Indians	-	2

=== Women Members ===
State	Constituency	Name of Elected M.P.	Party affiliation
Andhra Pradesh	Bhadrachalam (ST)	B. Radhabai Ananda Rao	Indian National Congress
Andhra Pradesh	Medak	Sangam Laxmi Bai	Indian National Congress
Andhra Pradesh	Khammam	T. Lakshmi Kantamma	Indian National Congress
Bihar	Barh	Tarkeshwari Sinha	Indian National Congress
Bihar	Chatra	Vijaya Raje	Independent politician
Bihar	Dhanbad	Rani Lalita Rajya Laxmi	Independent politician
Bihar	Palamau (SC)	Kamla Kumari	Indian National Congress
Gujrat	Amreli	Jayaben Shah	Indian National Congress
Kerala	Ambalapuzha	Suseela Gopalan	Communist Party of India
Madhya Pradesh	Guna	Vijaya Raje Scindia	Swatantra Party
Madhya Pradesh	Shahdol (ST)	Girja Kumari	Indian National Congress
Madhya Pradesh	Raigarh (ST)	Rajni Devi	Indian National Congress
Madhya Pradesh	Janjgir	Minimata Agam Dass Guru	Indian National Congress
Madhya Pradesh	Rajnandgaon	Padmawati Devi	Indian National Congress
Madras	Karur	C. Muthuswamy Gounder	Swatantra Party
Maharashtra	Ratnagiri	Sharda Mukherjee	Indian National Congress
Maharashtra	Hatkanangale	Maharani Vijayamala Bhonsle	Peasants and Workers Party of India
Punjab	Patiala	Mohinder Kaur	Indian National Congress
Punjab	Sangrur	Nirlep Kaur	Akali Dal – Sant Fateh Singh
Rajasthan	Jaipur	Gayatri Devi	Swatantra Party
Uttar Pradesh	Aonla	Savitri Shyam	Indian National Congress
Uttar Pradesh	Mohanlalganj (SC)	Ganga Devi	Indian National Congress
Uttar Pradesh	Rae Bareli	Indira Nehru Gandhi	Indian National Congress
Uttar Pradesh	Kaiserganj	Shakuntala Nayar	Bharatiya Jan Sangh
Uttar Pradesh	Gonda	Sucheta Kriplani	Indian National Congress
Uttar Pradesh	Phulpur	Vijaya Lakshmi Pandit	Indian National Congress
Uttar Pradesh	Bilhaur	Sushila Rohatgi	Indian National Congress
West Bengal	Darjeeling	Maitreyee Bose	Independent politician
West Bengal	Malda	Uma Roy	Indian National Congress

For the first time in India's parliamentary history, a couple was elected to the Lok Sabha - A. K. Gopalan (CPI MP from Palghat) & his wife Suseela (CPI MP from Ambalapuzha).
