= Jaisingnagar Assembly constituency =

Constituency of the Madhya Pradesh legislative assembly in India

Coordinates: 23.62°N 78.57°E

Jaisingnagar
- Constituency No. 84 for the Madhya Pradesh Legislative Assembly

Constituency details
- Country: India
- Region: Central India
- State: Madhya Pradesh
- District: Shahdol
- Lok Sabha constituency: Shahdol
- Established: 1972
- Reservation: ST

Member of Legislative Assembly
- 16th Madhya Pradesh Legislative Assembly
- Incumbent Manisha Singh
- Party: Bharatiya Janata Party
- Elected year: 2023
- Preceded by: Jaisingh Maravi

Jaisinghnagar is one of the 230 Vidhan Sabha (Legislative Assembly) constituencies of Madhya Pradesh state in central India. It comprises Shahdol, Jaisinghnagar and parts of Sohagpur and Jaisinghnagar tehsils, all in Shahdol district.

== Members of the Legislative Assembly ==
Election	Name	Party
2008	Sundar Singh	Bharatiya Janata Party
2013	Pramila Singh	Bharatiya Janata Party
2018	Jaisingh Maravi	Bharatiya Janata Party
2023	Manisha Singh	Bharatiya Janata Party

== Election results ==
=== 2023 ===
2023 Madhya Pradesh Legislative Assembly election: Jaisingnagar
Party	Candidate	Votes	%	±%
BJP	Manisha Singh	114,967	54.87	+8.67
INC	Narendra Singh Maravi	77,016	36.76	−0.01
BSP	Ranjeet Singh (Pintu)	5,546	2.65	+0.95
Independent	Shiv Kumar Baiga	2,478	1.18	
NOTA	None of the above	3,909	1.87	−0.5
Majority		37,951	18.11	+8.68
Turnout		209,522	81.72	+3.19
BJP hold		Swing		

=== 2018 ===
2018 Madhya Pradesh Legislative Assembly election: Jaisingnagar
Party	Candidate	Votes	%	±%
BJP	Jaisingh Maravi	84,669	46.2	
INC	Dhayan Singh Marco	67,402	36.77	
GGP	Neelam Singh Marabi	8,069	4.4	
Sapaks Party	Sheshram Baiga	3,720	2.03	
BSP	Vijay Kumar Kol	3,125	1.7	
CPI	Hari Singh	2,284	1.25	
NISHAD	Ayodhya Prasad Majhi	2,091	1.14	
Independent	Sunder Singh (Shalu Mausi)	1,824	1.0	
AAP	Farsu Kol	1,673	0.91	
NOTA	None of the above	4,340	2.37	
Majority		17,267	9.43	
Turnout		183,286	78.53	

== See also ==
- Shahdol district
- List of constituencies of the Madhya Pradesh Legislative Assembly
