= Manisha Singh (politician) =

Indian politician

Member of the 16th Madhya Pradesh Assembly
- Incumbent
- Assumed office December 2023
- Preceded by: Jaisingh Maravi
- Constituency: Jaisingnagar

Personal details
- Born: 1982 (age 43–44) Jaitpur
- Party: Bharatiya Janata Party
- Spouse: Rajendra Singh
- Education: Master of Arts in Political Science
- Alma mater: Awadhesh Pratap Singh University
- Occupation: Politician

Manisha Singh (born 1982) is an Indian politician from Madhya Pradesh. She is a member of the Madhya Pradesh Legislative Assembly representing the Bharatiya Janata Party from Jaisingnagar Assembly constituency, which is reserved for the Scheduled Tribe community, in Shahdol district. She was elected as an MLA in the 2023 Madhya Pradesh Legislative Assembly election.

== Early life and education ==
Singh is from an agricultural family in Jaitpur, Burhar tehsil, Shahdol district, Madhya Pradesh. She did her post-graduation in political science from Awadhesh Pratap Singh University, Rewa, Madhya Pradesh, in 2007. Her husband Rajendra Singh is a businessman.

== Career ==
Singh was elected from the Jaisingnagar Assembly constituency representing Bharatiya Janata Party in the 2023 Madhya Pradesh Legislative Assembly election. She polled 114,967 votes and defeated her nearest rival, Narendra Singh Maravi of the Indian National Congress, by a margin of 37,951 votes. She was elected as an MLA for the first time winning the 2018 Madhya Pradesh Legislative Assembly election from neighbouring Jaitpur Assembly constituency, which is also reserved for the Scheduled Tribe community in Shahdol district. She polled 84,669 votes and defeated her nearest rival, Uma Dhurwe of the Indian National Congress, by a margin of votes.
