= Shahdol Lok Sabha constituency =

Lok Sabha Constituency in Madhya Pradesh

Coordinates: 23.3°N 81.4°E

Shahdol
- Lok Sabha constituency
- Interactive Map Outlining Shahdol Lok Sabha constituency

Constituency details
- Country: India
- Region: Central India
- State: Madhya Pradesh
- Assembly constituencies: Jaisingnagar; Jaitpur; Kotma; Anuppur; Pushprajgarh; Bandhavgarh; Manpur; Barwara
- Established: 1952
- Total electors: 17,77,185
- Reservation: ST

Member of Parliament
- 18th Lok Sabha
- Incumbent Himadri Singh
- Party: Bharatiya Janata Party
- Elected year: 2019

Shahdol is one of the 29 Lok Sabha constituencies in Madhya Pradesh state in central India. This constituency is reserved for the candidates belonging to the Scheduled tribes. It covers the entire Anuppur and Umaria districts and parts of Shahdol and Katni districts.

== Assembly segments ==
Presently, since the delimitation of parliamentary and legislative assembly constituencies in 2008, Shahdol Lok Sabha constituency comprises the following eight Vidhan Sabha (Legislative Assembly) segments:

#	Name	District	Member	Party	2024 Lead
84	Jaisingnagar (ST)	Shahdol	Manish Singh	BJP	BJP
85	Jaitpur (ST)	Shahdol	Jaisingh Maravi	BJP	BJP
86	Kotma	Anuppur	Dilip Jaiswal	BJP	BJP
87	Anuppur (ST)	Anuppur	Bisahulal Singh	BJP	BJP
88	Pushprajgarh (ST)	Anuppur	Phundelal Singh Marko	INC	BJP
89	Bandhavgarh (ST)	Umaria	Shivnarayan Singh	BJP	BJP
90	Manpur (ST)	Umaria	Meena Singh	BJP	BJP
91	Barwara (ST)	Katni	Dhirendra bahadur singh	BJP	BJP

== Members of Parliament ==
Year	Member	Party
1952	Randhaman Singh	Kisan Mazdoor Praja Party
1952	Bhagwan Datta Shastri	Socialist Party
1957	Kamal Narain Singh	Indian National Congress
1962	Buddhu Singh Utiya	Socialist Party
1967	Girja Kumari	Indian National Congress
1971	Dhan Shah Pradhan	Independent
1977	Dalpat Singh Paraste	Janata Party
1980	Dalbir Singh	Indian National Congress (I)
1984	Dalbir Singh	Indian National Congress
1989	Dalpat Singh Paraste	Janata Dal
1991	Dalbir Singh	Indian National Congress
1996	Gyan Singh	Bharatiya Janata Party
1998	Gyan Singh	Bharatiya Janata Party
1999	Dalpat Singh Paraste	Bharatiya Janata Party
2004	Dalpat Singh Paraste	Bharatiya Janata Party
2009	Rajesh Nandini Singh	Indian National Congress
2014	Dalpat Singh Paraste	Bharatiya Janata Party
2016^	Gyan Singh	Bharatiya Janata Party
2019	Himadri Singh	Bharatiya Janata Party
2024	Himadri Singh	Bharatiya Janata Party

^ by poll

== Election results ==
=== 2024 ===
2024 Indian general election: Shahdol
Party	Candidate	Votes	%	±%
BJP	Himadri Singh	711,143	61.73	+1.30
INC	Phundelal Singh Marko	313,803	27.24	−0.60
GGP	Anil Singh Dhurwey	35,278	3.06	new
BSP	Dhani Ram Kol	21,854	1.9	+0.24
CPI	Samar Shah Singh Gond	19,883	1.73	−0.99
NOTA	None of the above	19,361	1.68	+0.06
Majority		397,340	34.49	+1.9
Turnout		11,49,506 (Note: does not include postal ballots)	64.68	▼10.09
BJP hold		Swing		

=== 2019 ===
2019 Indian general elections: Shahdol
Party	Candidate	Votes	%	±%
BJP	Himadri Singh	747,977	60.43	+16.00
INC	Pramila Singh	3,44,644	27.84	−11.02
CPI	Bahan Keshkali Kol	33,695	2.72	+0.77
BSP	Mohadal Singh Pav	20,598	1.66	new
NOTA	None of the Above	20,027	1.62	+0.23
Majority		4,03,333	32.59	+27.02
Turnout		12,38,486	74.77	+7.09
BJP hold		Swing	+7.09	

=== 2016 By-Election ===
Bye-election, 2016: Shahdol
Party	Candidate	Votes	%	±%
BJP	Gyan Singh	481,398	44.43	−9.79
INC	Himadri Singh	4,21,015	38.86	+9.54
GGP	Heera Singh Markam	55,306	5.10	+2.95
CPI	Parmeshwar Singh Porte	21,143	1.95	−0.90
Independent	Shiv Charan Paw	17,190	1.58	+1.58
NOTA	None of the Above	15,066	1.39	−0.82
Majority		60,383	5.57	−19.33
Turnout		10,83,411	67.68	+5.63
BJP hold		Swing	-9.79	

=== 2014 ===
2014 Indian general elections: Shahdol
Party	Candidate	Votes	%	±%
BJP	Dalpat Singh Paraste	525,419	54.22	+14.49
INC	Rajesh Nandini Singh	2,84,118	29.32	−12.54
CPI	Parmeshwar Singh Porte	27,619	2.85	−1.00
GGP	Ramratan Singh Pawley	20,834	2.15	−2.77
AAP	Er. Vijay Kumar Kol	20,312	2.10	+2.10
NOTA	None of the Above	21,376	2.21	+2.21
Majority		2,41,301	24.90	+22.77
Turnout		9,68,518	62.05	+12.58
BJP gain from INC		Swing	+12.36	

=== 2009 ===
2009 Indian general elections: Shahdol
Party	Candidate	Votes	%	±%
INC	Rajesh Nandini Singh	263,434	41.82	N/A
BJP	Narendra Singh Maravi	2,50,019	39.69	N/A
GGP	Ramratan Singh Pawley	30,967	4.92	N/A
BSP	Manohar Singh Maravi	26,757	4.25	N/A
Majority		13,415	2.13	N/A
Turnout		6,29,837	49.50	N/A
INC gain from BJP		Swing		

== See also ==
- Anuppur district
- Shahdol district
- Umaria district
- List of constituencies of the Lok Sabha
