= Bandhavgarh Fort =

Dilapidated ancient Indian monument

- Part of Bandhavgarh National Park
- Umaria district, Madhya Pradesh
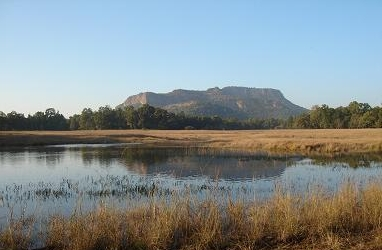
- Bandhavgarh Fort

Site information
- Type: Hill fort
- Owner: Government of India
- Open to the public: no
- Condition: Dilapidated

Location
- Shown within Madhya Pradesh
- Location within Madhya Pradesh
- Coordinates: 23°40′58.96″N 81°2′7.49″E
- Height: 811 metres (2,661 ft)

Site history
- Built: 10th Century
- Materials: Stone

The Bandhavgarh Fort is situated in Bandhavgarh in Umaria district of Madhya Pradesh, India. It is located on the Bandhavgarh hill, rising 811 meters above sea level at the centre of the Bandhavgarh National Park. It is surrounded by many smaller hills separated by gently sloping valleys. These valleys end in small, swampy meadows, locally known as 'bohera' This fort and region was ruled by many Rajput dynasties and was under Baghel Rajput kings of Rewa till 1947.

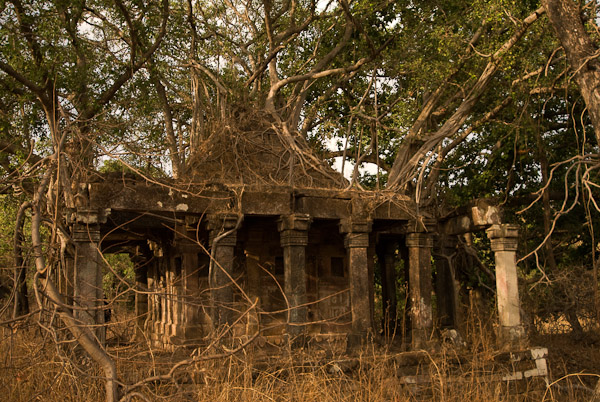
Ancient temple in Bandhavgarh Fort

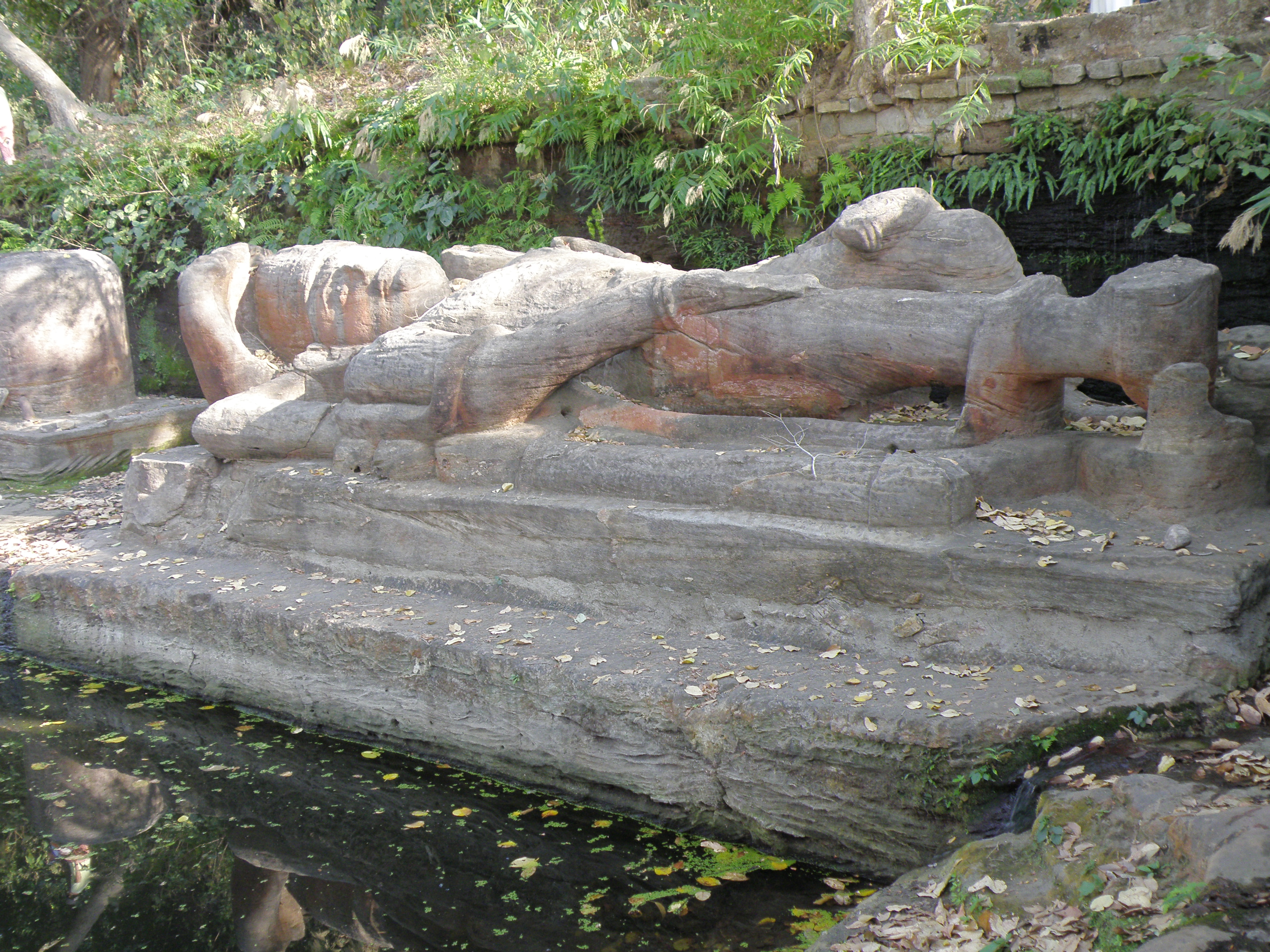
Shesh Shaiya

The Bandhavgarh region was ruled by Maghas, Gupta, Pratihara and Kalachuri. The region was under Baghel Rajput kings of Rewa till 1947. During the reign of the Baghel Rajput ruler Maharaja Duryodhan Singh (r.1602–1618), Emperor Akbar intervened in the region in 1597. Following a war and an eight-month-long siege, Akbar’s forces captured and dismantled the Bandhavgarh Fort. Maharaja Duryodhan Singh was succeeded by his son, Maharaja Vikramaditya Deo (r.1618–1630), who established Rewa city as the new capital in 1618, transferring the capital from Bandhavgarh to Rewa and thereby marking a significant shift in the political centre of the Baghel kingdom.
