= Chandia, Madhya Pradesh =

Chandia
- Town
- Location in Madhya Pradesh, India Chandia (India)
- Coordinates: 23.65°N 80.7°E
- Country: India
- State: Madhya Pradesh
- District: Umaria
- Elevation: 398 m (1,306 ft)

Population (2011)
  - Total: 15,000

Languages
  - Official: Hindi
- Time zone: UTC+5:30 (IST)
- ISO 3166 code: IN-MP
- Vehicle registration: MP-54

Chandia is a town and a nagar parishad, near Umaria town in Umaria district in the state of Madhya Pradesh, India.

== Geography ==
Chandia is located at 23.65°N 80.7°E. It has an average elevation of 398 metres (1,305 feet).

== History ==
Chandia was a Ilakedari (estate) ruled by Baghel Rajput under the flag of Rewa State. In 16th century, estate of Chandiya was granted to Kunwar Mangad Rai, He got the title of Lal Saheb. The illaka was spread over an area of 454 Square Miles which had 84 Villages. The illakedar Chandia had right to collect tax on behalf of Maharaja of Rewa State. The illakedar had to be present in the Dusshera Durbar and pay Nazarana to Maharaja of Rewa and be present in the service of Maharaja Rewa whenever required.

REPORT OF THE COMMITTEE APPOINTED TO ENQUIRE INTO THE NATURE OF THE PAWAI TENURES IN REWA STATE 1934 Page Number 13 states that Chandia. Major Barr also noted as follows in 1885:- " I . added that the Rewa Durbar had shown great kindness to her (Thakurain of Chandia) by allowing her twice to adopt a successor.she must, therefore, leave the entire management to Lal Chatradharl Singh who had been appointed by me on behalf of His Highness the Maharaja of Rewa, the illakedar of Chandia, and the sovereign of all those who owed allegiance to the Durbar. He built a very beautiful Fort of Chandia and ruled from it. Currently the fort is situated in the middle of the town reside in the fort with family.

The Population of Chandia ( 1901 ) 3,469; males 1,636, females 1,833, comprising 2,576 Hindus and 530 Animists; occupied houses 893, Chandia is the seat of the Illakedar of Chandia constituting 84 villages together see The Central India State Gazetteer Series, Volume 4 year 1942.

The Illakedari (zamindari) system was abolished in independent India soon after its creation with the first amendment to the constitution of India which amended the right to property as shown in Articles 19 and 31

== Demographics ==
As of 2001 India census, Chandia had a population of 12,806. Males constitute 51% of the population and females 49%. Chandia has an average literacy rate of 53%, lower than the national average of 59.5%; with male literacy of 65% and female literacy of 40%. 17% of the population is under 6 years of age.
