= Manpur, Umaria =

Manpur
- Town
- Location in Madhya Pradesh, India
- Coordinates: 23.76°N 81.12°E

Manpur is a block and the biggest tehsil of Umaria district in Madhya Pradesh. It is situated at a distance of 45 km from its district headquarters Umaria and about 12 km from Bandhavgarh National Park, and The Tala-Jaisinghnagar road passes through it.

There is sone river nearly 6 km in north east direction. Famous jwalamukhi temple in the east direction from manpur. Manpur is rapidly developing town in umaria district. It is 12 km from national park Bandhavgarh which was famous for white tiger at the time of the rewa kingdom.

== Bandhavgarh ==
Bandhavgarh The Word Bandhavgarh means the Fort of Laxman and on the way of the Fort we get the stone carved Shesh Shai. There is a book called “Bandhavanchal Mahatm”, which proves this fact more and give the information about the ancient history of this place. There are some ruins found of the Fort in the Bamania Hill near Bandhavgarh and there are many sculptures and coins found in the nearby villages near Bandhavgarh, Bijhariya, Mala which prove the economical and artistic situation of the kingdom. Government high school, Government hospital, Kisan Kosh (Sigudi), Rohaniya Chatravas, Shri chotelal Patel Chatravas established in Manpur region by freedom fighter Shri Chhotelal Patel ji.shri chhotelal patel was the first MLA of manpur. In ancient times, Manpur was a part of the vindhya pradesh. Shri Chhotelal Patel was born in Sigudi village. Sigudi is considered to be the political stronghold of the Manpur. The memorial of Shri Chhotelal Patel is in Sigudi village.

== Geography ==
Manpur is located at the coordinates 23.46°N 81.7°E. It has an average elevation of 393 meters (1,289 feet)

== Demographics ==
In manpur total 1583 families residing. The Manpur village has population of 7119 of which 3675 are males while 3444 are females as Census 2011.

== Education ==
- Shri chotelal patel government college
- ITI college.
- Nav Jyoti academy higher secondary School
- Saraswati higher secondary school.
- Excellence school.
