= Rupaund =

Human settlement in India

Coordinates: 23°44′N 80°33′E

Rupaund is a town in Umaria district of Madhya Pradesh, India.
