= Himadri Singh =

Politician from Madhya Pradesh, India

Member of Parliament, Lok Sabha
- In office Second
- In office 23 May 2019 – still
- Preceded by: Gyan Singh
- Constituency: Shahdol

Personal details
- Born: 9 April 1988 (age 38) New Delhi, India
- Party: Bharatiya Janata Party
- Other political affiliations: Indian National Congress
- Spouse: Narendra Maravi
- Children: 1
- Parent(s): Rajesh Nandini Singh(mother) , Dalbir Singh (Father)
- Profession: Politician

Himadri Singh (born 9 April 1988; Hindi pronunciation: [ɦɪmaːd̪ɾiː sɪŋgʱ]) is an Indian politician. She was elected to the Lok Sabha, lower house of the Parliament of India from Shahdol, Madhya Pradesh in the 2019 Indian general election as member of the Bharatiya Janata Party. She again elected from Shahdol Loksabha in 2024 Indian general election. Her mother Rajesh Nandini singh was a member of Madhyapradesh legislative assembly from Kotma in 1993 and a member of parliament from Shahdol Loksabha in 2009. Her father Dalbir singh was also member of parliament from Shahdol Loksabha in 1980,1984 and 1991.
