= Meena Singh (Manpur politician) =

Indian politician (born 1971)

Minister of Tribal Welfare Madhya Pradesh Government
- Incumbent
- Assumed office 21 April 2020
- Chief Minister: Shivraj Singh Chouhan

Member Of Legislative Assembly Madhya Pradesh
- Incumbent
- Assumed office 2008
- Constituency: Manpur
- In office 2003–2008
- Constituency: Nowrozabad

Personal details
- Party: Bharatiya Janata Party

Meena Singh (born 1971) is an Indian politician from Umaria district in Madhya Pradesh. She belongs to Bhartiya Janata Party and was elected thrice as an MLA of Manpur Assembly Constituency which is a reserved constituency for ST Community in Umaria district. She also served as the Minister of Tribal Welfare of Madhya Pradesh under CM Shivraj Singh Chauhan from 21 April 2020.

== Early life and education ==
Singh hails from an agricultural family in Bandhavgarh. She married Madhav Singh. She completed her post graduation in Arts from Awadhesh Pratap Singh University, Rewa, in 1998.

== Career ==
Singh became an MLA for the first time winning the 2013 Madhya Pradesh Legislative Assembly Election representing BJP and retained the Manpur Assembly Constituency. She defeated Gyanvati Singh of Indian National Congress by a margin of 43,628 votes. She retained the seat winning the 2018 Madhya Pradesh Legislative Assembly Election defeating Gyanvati Singh again for the second time, but by a lesser margin of 18,655 votes. She won again to become a three-time MLA from Manpur Assembly Constituency representing BJP. This time around, she defeated Tilak Raj Singh of Indian National Congress by a margin of 25,265 votes.
