= Pushprajgarh Assembly constituency =

Constituency of the Madhya Pradesh legislative assembly in India

Coordinates: 23.00°N 81.61°E

Pushprajgarh
- Constituency No. 88 for the Madhya Pradesh Legislative Assembly

Constituency details
- Country: India
- Region: Central India
- State: Madhya Pradesh
- District: Anuppur
- Lok Sabha constituency: Shahdol
- Established: 1957
- Reservation: ST

Member of Legislative Assembly
- 16th Madhya Pradesh Legislative Assembly
- Incumbent Phundelal Singh Marko
- Party: Indian National Congress
- Elected year: 2023
- Preceded by: Sudama Singh Singram

Pushprajgarh is one of the 230 Vidhan Sabha (Legislative Assembly) constituencies of Madhya Pradesh state in central India. It is a segment of Shahdol (Lok Sabha constituency).

It is in Anuppur district, near the state border with Chhattisgarh.

== Members of the Legislative Assembly ==
Election	Member	Party
1957	Lalan Singh	Indian National Congress
1962	Chinta Ram	Praja Socialist Party
1967	Lalan Singh	Indian National Congress
1972	Dalbir Singh	Independent
1977	Hazari Singh	Janata Party
1980	Ambika Singh	Indian National Congress (Indira)
1985	Deelan Singh	Indian National Congress
1990	Kundan Singh	Janata Dal
1993	Shivprasad Singh	Indian National Congress
1998	Shivprasad Singh	Indian National Congress
2003	Sudama Singh Singram	Bharatiya Janata Party
2008	Sudama Singh Singram	Bharatiya Janata Party
2013	Phundelal Singh Marko	Indian National Congress
2018	Phundelal Singh Marko	Indian National Congress
2023	Phundelal Singh Marko	Indian National Congress

== Election results ==
=== 2023 ===
2023 Madhya Pradesh Legislative Assembly election: Pushprajgarh
Party	Candidate	Votes	%	±%
INC	Phundelal Singh Marko	68,020	42.14	−0.08
BJP	Herrasingh Shyam	63,534	39.36	+11.63
GGP	Anil Singh Dhurwey	13,211	8.18	−5.08
Bharatiya Shakti Chetna Party	Amit Kumar Padwar	3,832	2.37	−0.07
Independent	Narmada Singh	2,720	1.68	
CPI(M)	Ramesh	1,894	1.17	−0.63
NOTA	None of the above	3,985	2.47	−0.29
Majority		4,486	2.78	−11.71
Turnout		161,431	80.5	+0.79
INC hold		Swing		

=== 2018 ===
2018 Madhya Pradesh Legislative Assembly election: Pushprajgarh
Party	Candidate	Votes	%	±%
INC	Phundelal Singh Marko	62,352	42.22	
BJP	Narendra Singh Maravi	40,951	27.73	
GGP	Anil Singh Dhurwey	19,579	13.26	
Independent	Sudama Singh Singram	5,157	3.49	
Bhartiya Shakti Chetna Party	Amit Padawar (Adhivakta)	3,596	2.44	
CPI(M)	Vishambhar Singh Marko	2,656	1.8	
Independent	Prakash Singh Dhurwey	1,798	1.22	
BSP	Nayan Singh Dhurwey	1,713	1.16	
AAP	Hublal Tandiya	1,586	1.07	
Independent	Sahdev Singh Paraste Swai.Se.Ni.Shikshak	1,554	1.05	
NOTA	None of the above	4,072	2.76	
Majority		21,401	14.49	
Turnout		147,677	79.71	
INC hold		Swing		

=== 2013 ===
2013 Madhya Pradesh Legislative Assembly election: Pushprajgarh
Party	Candidate	Votes	%	±%
INC	Phundelal Singh Marko	69,192	50.06	
BJP	Sudama Singh Singram	33545	24.27	
GGP	Lalan Singh Paraste	10759	7.78	N/A
BSCP	Ramkripal	4575	3.31	
CPI(M)	Jhamaklal Kol	938	0.73	
SP	Ram Shingh Armo	2635	1.91	N/A
BSP	Sudheer Kumar Kapardi	934	0.73	
Independent	Sampat Singh Dhurve	2025	1.47	
NCP	Hublal Tandiya	1434	1.04	
Independent	Rambali Singh	1248	0.90	
Independent	Bhanwar Singh	1037	0.75	
NOTA	None of the Above	5349	3.87	
Majority				
Turnout		138224	77.34	
Swing to INC from BJP		Swing		

=== 1977 ===
- Hazari Singh (JNP) : 12,282 votes
- Dalbir Singh (INC) : 3,851
