= Rajesh Nandini Singh =

Indian politician

Member of Parliament, 15th Lok Sabha
- In office 2009–2014
- Preceded by: Dalpat Singh Paraste
- Succeeded by: Dalpat Singh Paraste
- Constituency: Shahdol

Personal details
- Born: 23 March 1957 Vill. Birra, Bilaspur district
- Died: 8 May 2016 (aged 59)
- Party: Indian National Congress
- Spouse: Dalbir Singh
- Children: 1 daughter and 1 son
- Parents: Dugeshwar Singh (father); Bhanu Devi Singh (mother)
- Education: BSc
- Alma mater: Ravi Shankar Vishwavidyalaya, Raipur,
- As of 9, 2012 Source: []

Rajesh Nandini Singh (23 March 1957 – 8 May 2016) was an Indian politician who belonged to the Indian National Congress party. She was born in the village Birra, Janjgir-Champa district, Chhattisgarh the third child of Diwan Durgeshwar Singh, Zamindar of Birra and Rajkumari Bhanu Kumari Devi from royal house of Ambagarh Chauki. In the 2009 election she was elected to the 15th Lok Sabha from the Shahdol Lok Sabha constituency of Madhya Pradesh. She was earlier member of Madhya Pradesh Legislative assembly during 1993–1998.

She was married to Dalbir Singh, who was also a politician. After his death, she continued to maintain the family's involvement in politics. She had one daughter and one son. Her daughter Himadri Singh contested the Lok Sabha by-poll from Shahdol unsuccessfully in November 2016.

Rajesh Nandini Singh died of heart attack in May 2016, at the age of 59.
