= Panpatha Wildlife Sanctuary =

Wildlife sanctuary in Madhya Pradesh, India

- IUCN category IV (habitat/species management area)
- Location within Madhya Pradesh Location within India
- Interactive map of Panpatha Wildlife Sanctuary
- Location: Umaria district, Madhya Pradesh, India
- Nearest city: Bandhavgarh
- Coordinates: 23.69944°N 80.96194°E
- Area: 245.84 km^{2} (94.92 sq mi)
- Established: 1983
- Governing body: Forest Department, Government of Madhya Pradesh

Panpatha is a wildlife sanctuary located in Umaria district in the Indian state of Madhya Pradesh. It was established in 1983 and covers approximately 245.84 km² of dry deciduous forest adjoining Bandhavgarh Tiger Reserve.

== Flora and fauna ==
Location of Panpatha Wildlife Sanctuary adjacent to Bandhavgarh National Park in Madhya Pradesh
M: municipality, NP: National Park, WLS: Wildlife Sanctuary, H: Historical place

The sanctuary preserves dry deciduous and sal forest, supporting tiger (Panthera tigris), leopard (P. pardus), gaur, sambar, chousingha, nilgai, barking deer, wild boar, jackal, hyena, chital, four horned antelope and jackals.

A 2021 assessment by WWF‑India and the Wildlife Institute of India emphasized Panpatha's role as a critical corridor facilitating tiger movement between Panna and Bandhavgarh, recommending landscape-level management to preserve connectivity.

== Tourism ==
In July 2025, the state government approved Eco-Sensitive Zone master plans for eight protected areas, including Panpatha, to manage development and promote sustainable tourism.

The sanctuary, about 73 km from Khajuraho Airport and accessible via SH‑10 from Umaria, offers jeep safaris during October–June mornings and evenings.
