= Umaria Coalfield =

Coal mine in Madhya Pradesh, India

- Location in Madhya Pradesh
- Location: Madhya Pradesh, India; 23°25′N 81°38′E
- Company: South Eastern Coalfields Limited
- Website: http://secl.gov.in/
- Acquired: 1985

Umaria Coalfield is located in Umaria district in the Indian state of Madhya Pradesh in the valley of the Umrer River, a tributary of the Son River.

== History ==
In 1886, W.W. Hunter wrote, “Extensive coalfields have recently been discovered at Umaria, within the native state of Rewa…”

Umaria Coalfield, which was owned by Rewa Coalfields Limited, was nationalized in 1973.

== The coalfield ==
Umaria Coalfield is a part of Central India Coalfields. The latter is spread over the districts of Surguja, Koriya (both in Chhattisgarh), Shahdol and Umaria (both in Madhya Pradesh). There are fourteen coalfields in this group, namely Korar, Umaria, Johilla(Nowrozabad), Sohagpur, Sonhat, Jhilimili, Chirimiri, Sendurgarh, Koreagarh, Damhamunda, Panchbahini, Hasdeo-Arand, Lakhanpur and Bishrampur. The group covers an area of about 5,345 square kilometres (2,064 sq mi) with estimated reserves of 15,613.98 million tonnes. The deposits are at a depth of 0–1200 meters. Therefore, extraction is mainly amenable to underground mining except a few blocks in eastern part of these coalfields which have opencast potential.

In Umaria Coalfield, the Lower Gondwana rocks are well developed. The coalfield has an estimated reserve of 181.29 million tonnes, spread across six coal seams. The coals are relatively high in moisture (7-10%) and high in ash (18.6-29.4%). South Eastern Coalfields Limited operates eight mines.

According to Geological Survey of India reserves of non-coking coal up to a depth of 300 m in Umaria Coalfield was 181.29 million tonnes. Kanchan Open Cast Mine is being expanded from 0.32 million tonnes per annum to 0.65 million tonnes per annum, with a peak capacity of 0.75 million tonnes per annum. The entire overburden would be backfilled. There is 4 km metalled road connecting the mine to Vindhya Mine and onwards to Nowrozabad Railway siding.

== Transport ==
The 37 miles (60 km) Katni Umaria Railways section was opened to traffic in 1886. The line from Katni, 171 miles (275 km) from Allahabad on the Jabalpur line, to Umaria, then in Rewa State, was accorded priority in construction, in order to connect Umaria Coalfield to the railway system. The 161 miles (259 km) Bilaspur-Umaria branch line was opened in 1891, linking the entire area to the GIPR system at Katni.
