= Jaitpur Assembly constituency =

Constituency of the Madhya Pradesh legislative assembly in India

Coordinates: 22.61°N 76.10°E

Jaitpur
- Constituency No. 85 for the Madhya Pradesh Legislative Assembly

Constituency details
- Country: India
- Region: Central India
- State: Madhya Pradesh
- District: Shahdol
- Lok Sabha constituency: Shahdol
- Established: 1962
- Total electors: 246,489
- Reservation: ST

Member of Legislative Assembly
- 16th Madhya Pradesh Legislative Assembly
- Incumbent Jaisingh Maravi
- Party: Bharatiya Janata Party
- Elected year: 2023
- Preceded by: Manisha Singh

Jaitpur is one of the 230 Vidhan Sabha (Legislative Assembly) constituencies of Madhya Pradesh state in central India.

It is part of Shahdol district, and is reserved for members of the Scheduled Tribes. As of 2023, it is represented by Jaisingh Naravi of the Bharatiya Janata Party.

== Members of the Legislative Assembly ==
Election	Name	Party
1962	Ram Prasad	Socialist Party
1967	Bhagwandin Gond	Indian National Congress
1972	Bhagwandin Gond	Indian National Congress
1977-2008 : Constituency dissolved
2008	Jaisingh Maravi	Bharatiya Janata Party
2013	Jaisingh Maravi	Bharatiya Janata Party
2018	Manisha Singh	Bharatiya Janata Party
2023	Jaisingh Maravi	Bharatiya Janata Party

== Election results ==
=== 2023 ===
2023 Madhya Pradesh Legislative Assembly election: Jaitpur
Party	Candidate	Votes	%	±%
BJP	Jaisingh Maravi	107,698	53.66	+12.4
INC	Uma Dhurvey	75,993	37.86	−1.06
GGP	Bharat Singh Oladi	5,090	2.54	−3.85
ASP(KR)	Katahura	2,098	1.05	
NOTA	None of the above	3,626	1.81	+0.71
Majority		31,705	15.8	+13.46
Turnout		200,717	81.43	+3.34
BJP hold		Swing		

=== 2018 ===
2018 Madhya Pradesh Legislative Assembly election: Jaitpur
Party	Candidate	Votes	%	±%
BJP	Manisha Singh	74,279	41.26	
INC	Uma Dhurwey	70,063	38.92	
GGP	Bharat Singh Oladi	11,498	6.39	
BSP	Mohadal Singh Pav	6,141	3.41	
Independent	Sukh Lal Baiga	3,953	2.2	
Sapaks Party	Jankibai Singh	2,094	1.16	
Independent	Shiv Charan Pao	1,875	1.04	
Independent	Bhai Bimal Baiga	1,763	0.98	
NOTA	None of the above	1,973	1.1	
Majority		4,216	2.34	
Turnout		180,039	78.09	
BJP hold		Swing		
