= Jaisingh Maravi =

Indian politician

Member of Madhya Pradesh Legislative Assembly

Assembly Member for Jaitpur
- In office 2008–2018
- Preceded by: Bhagwandin
- Constituency: Jaitpur
- Incumbent
- Assumed office 2023
- Preceded by: Manisha Singh
- Constituency: Jaitpur

Assembly Member for Jaisingnagar
- In office 2018–2023
- Preceded by: Pramila Singh

Personal details
- Party: Bharatiya Janata Party
- Profession: Politician

Jaisingh Maravi is an Indian politician from Madhya Pradesh. He is a four time elected Member of the Madhya Pradesh Legislative Assembly from 2008, 2013, and 2023, representing Gurgaon Assembly constituency and from 2018 representing Jaisingnagar Assembly constituency as a Member of the Bharatiya Janata Party.

== See also ==
- List of chief ministers of Madhya Pradesh
- Madhya Pradesh Legislative Assembly
