= Nowrozabad =

Nowrozabad Johilla area
- City
- Location in Madhya Pradesh, India Nowrozabad (India)
- Coordinates: 23°21′38″N 80°59′15″E
- Country: India
- State: Madhya Pradesh
- District: umaria
- Subdistrict: Nowrozabad

Government
  - Type: Municipal council government

Area
  - Total: 22 km^{2} (8.5 sq mi)

Population (2011)
  - Total: 21,883
  - Density: 990/km^{2} (2,600/sq mi)

Languages
  - Official: Hindi
- Time zone: UTC+5:30 (IST)
- PIN: 484555
- Telephone area code: 07653
- ISO 3166 code: ISO 3166-2:IN
- Vehicle registration: MP 54

Nowrozabad or Khodargama is a city and a Nagar Palika in Umaria district in the Indian state of Madhya Pradesh. Kendriya Vidyalaya Nowrozabad is situated in the G.M Complex Johilla area. Nowrozabad is the head office of Johilla area. The nearest Airport is at Jabalpur ( 130 km ) in Madhya pradesh. Nowrozabad Railway Station is on the Katni - Anuppur rail route. There are many coal mines around here. National Highway 43 (old national highway 78) has its route through Nowrozabad.

== Demographics ==
As of 2001 India census, Nowrozabad had a population of 22,401. Males constitute 52% of the population and females 48%. Nowrozabad has an average literacy rate of 59%, lower than the national average of 59.5%: male literacy is 68%, and female literacy is 49%. In Nowrozabad, 15% of the population is under 6 years of age. Nowrozabad tehsil has 57 village. The STD code of Nowrozabad is 07653 and vehicle no. is MP54.

== Employment ==
The city of Nowrozabad (see Johilla area) is rich in the coal deposits found in the region. The coal industrial belt has developed in the region owing to the close proximity of the coalmines. The most reputed government undertaking and the largest coal producing industry in India, the South Eastern Coalfields Limited is located in the region. Nowrozabad is one of the 13 administrative areas of the coal industry. It is the head office of Johila area.

Major employment source in the city are coal mines of South Eastern Coal Fields Ltd.

== Coalfield ==
In 1886, W.W. Hunter wrote, “Extensive coalfields have recently been discovered at Nowrozabad, within the native state of Rewa…”

Nowrozabad Johilla Coalfield, which was owned by Rewa Coalfields Limited, was nationalized in 1973.

== Johilla river ==
Nowrozabad is situated on the banks of this river. Because of which it is also known as Johilla area. Johilla river which originates near Amarkantak in Anuppur district of Madhya Pradesh. The Johilla River is a tributary of the Son River, which is the second largest tributary of the Ganges River from the southern bank.

== Transport ==
=== By road ===
National High way 43 connects Nowrozabad with other parts of the state. Bus services operate between the different cities of Madhya Pradesh (like Shahdol, Anuppur, Katni, Satna, Rewa, Jabalpur, Mandla, Dindori, Seoni ), Maharastra (Nagpur). Chhattisgrah (Chirimiri, Bilaspur, Raipur, Durg), Uttar Pradesh (Allahabad, Varanasi).

=== By Train ===
Various trains are available for connectivity to other cities like Jabalpur, Katni, Satna, Rewa, Bhopal, Indore, Anuppur, Chirimiri, Bilaspur, Raipur, Durg, Ambikapur, etc.

Nowrozabad Railway station has direct connectivity with many cities of Madhya Pradesh, Chhattishgarh, Maharastra Uttar pradesh, Bihar.

Nowrozabad station is situated on the Katni - Anuppur railway line.
