= Phundelal Singh Marko =

Indian politician

Member of the Madhya Pradesh Legislative Assembly
- Incumbent
- Assumed office 2013
- Preceded by: Sudama Singh
- Constituency: Pushprajgarh

Personal details
- Born: 5 June 1965 (age 60)
- Citizenship: India
- Party: Indian National Congress
- Spouse: Premwati Singh Marko
- Children: 2
- Education: LLB
- Profession: Politician
- As of 13 June, 2018 Source: ["Biography:Marko, Phundelal Singh" (PDF). Madhya Pradesh Legislative Assembly.]

Phundelal Singh Marko (born 1965), also spelled as Fundelal Marko, is an Indian politician from Madhya Pradesh. He is a three time MLA from Pushprajgarh Assembly constituency, in Anuppur District. He won the 2023 Madhya Pradesh Legislative Assembly election from representing Indian National Congress party.

== Early life and education ==
Marko is from Pushprajgarh, Anuppur District, Madhya Pradesh. He is the son of late Baldev Singh Marko. He completed his M.A. in 2007 at Shambhunath Shukla government college, Shahdol. Earlier, he dis his LLB at Law College, Shahdol, which is affiliated with Awadhesh Pratap Singh University, Rewa, Madhya Pradesh. Earlier, he worked as a government assistant teacher at H.S. school, Rajendragraam run by the tribal department from 1987 to 1993.

== Career ==
Marko was first elected as an MLA winning the 2013 Madhya Pradesh Legislative Assembly election. He retained the Pushprajgarh seat in the 2018 Assembly election representing the Indian National Congress. He won for a third consecutive term in the 2023 Assembly election.

He started his political life as a student in 1984 and was elected as the president of the government college in Pushprajgarh. Later, he was elected as a member of the Shahdol panchayat in 1994 and as vice president in 1999.

== See also ==
- Madhya Pradesh Legislative Assembly
- 2013 Madhya Pradesh Legislative Assembly election
