= Girja Kumari =

Indian politician

Member of Parliament, Lok Sabha
- In office 1967–1971
- Preceded by: Buddhu Singh
- Succeeded by: Dhan Shah
- Constituency: Shahdol, Madhya Pradesh

Personal details
- Party: Indian National Congress

Girja Kumari was an Indian politician. She was elected to the Lok Sabha, the lower house of the Parliament of India from the Shahdol in Madhya Pradesh as a member of the Indian National Congress.
