= Jaitpura =

- Panchayat Headquarter
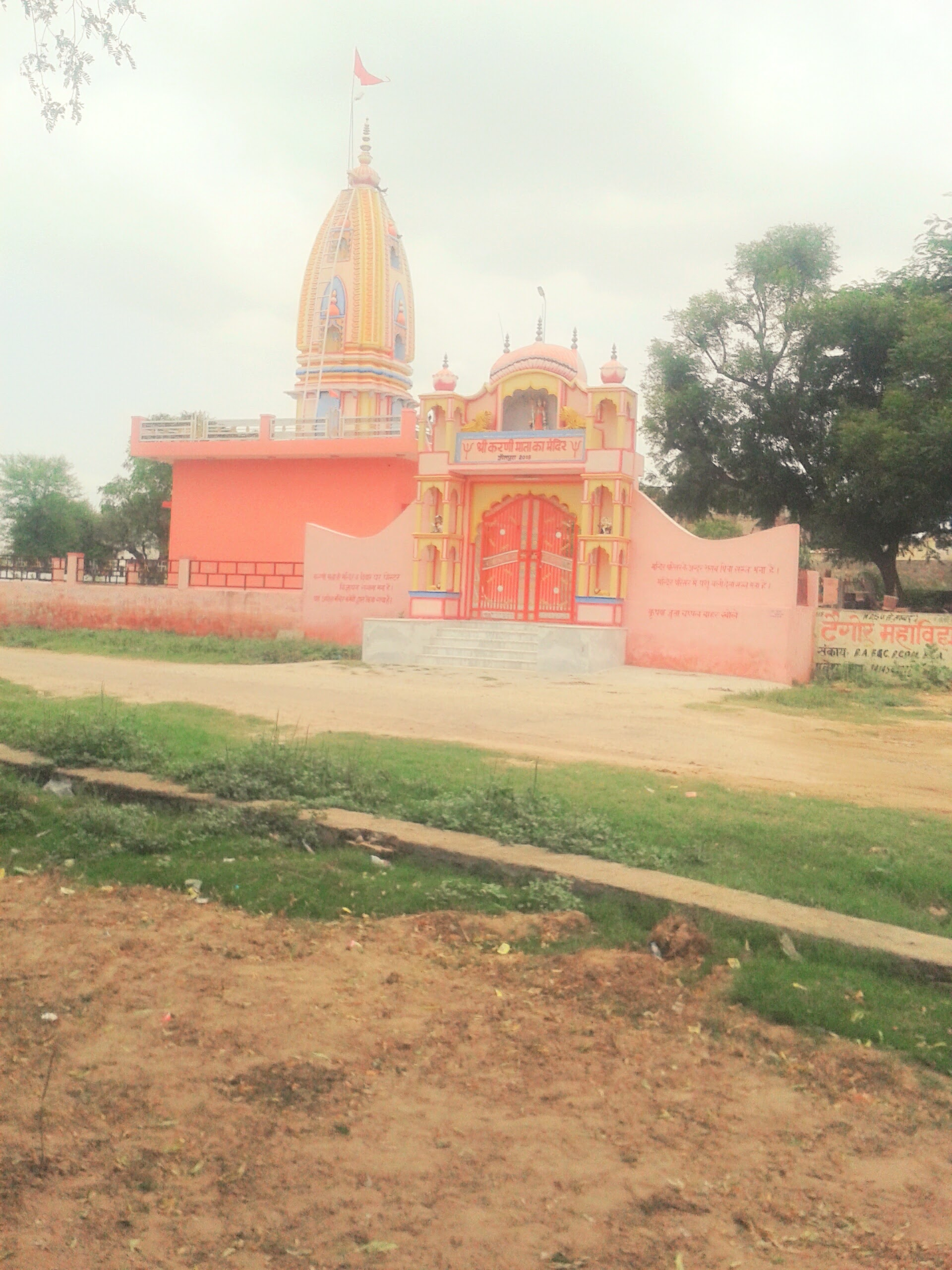
- Karni Mata Mandir, Jaitpura

- Location in Rajasthan
- Coordinates: 27.27855°N 74.627054°E
- Country: India
- State: Rajasthan
- District: Didwana-Kuchaman district
- Established: 1736
- Founder: Girvar Dan Ji Kaviya

Government
  - Type: Panchayat
  - MLA: Yoonus Khan

Area
  - Total: 2 km^{2} (0.77 sq mi)
- Elevation: 342 m (1,122 ft)

Population (2011)
  - Total: 929
  - Density: 250/km^{2} (650/sq mi)

Languages
  - Official: Rajasthani, Marwari, Hindi, English
- Time zone: UTC+5:30 (IST)
- Postal Code: 341506
- STD code: 01580
- Vehicle registration: RJ-37
- Sex ratio: 472/457
- Website: jaitpura.com

Jaitpura village is located in Didwana-Kuchaman district of Rajasthan, India. It is in Moulasar tehsil of Didwana-Kuchaman.
