= Jaisinghnagar =

Jaysinhnagar
- Town
- Location in Madhya Pradesh, India Jaysinhnagar (India)
- Coordinates: 23°41′7.5″N 81°23′26″E
- Country: India
- State: Madhya Pradesh
- District: Shahdol district
- Elevation: 593 m (1,946 ft)

Population (2001)
  - Total: 7,392

Languages
  - Official: Hindi
- Time zone: UTC+5:30 (IST)
- Postal code: 484771
- ISO 3166 code: IN-MP
- Vehicle registration: MP-18

Jaysinhnagar is a town and a nagar panchayat in Shahdol district in the Indian state of Madhya Pradesh.

== Geography ==
Jaisinagar is located at 23°41'07.5"N 81°23'26.5"E. It has an average elevation of 593 metres (1,945 feet).

== Demographics ==
As of 2001 India census, Jaisinagar had a population of 7,392. Males constitute 52% of the population and females 48%. Jaisinghnagar has an average literacy rate of 57%, lower than the national average of 59.5%: male literacy is 65%, and female literacy is 48%. In Jaisinghnagar, 15% of the population is under 6 years of age.
