= Pali, Umaria =

Town in Umaria district, Madhya Pradesh, India

Birsinghpur Pali Birsinghpur Pali
- Town
- Location in Madhya Pradesh, India Birsinghpur Pali (India)
- Coordinates: 23.35°N 81.05°E
- Country: India
- State: Madhya Pradesh
- District: Umaria
- Elevation: 450 m (1,480 ft)

Population (2014)
  - Total: 124,175

Languages
  - Official: Hindi
- Time zone: UTC+5:30 (IST)
- Postal code: 484551
- ISO 3166 code: IN-MP
- Vehicle registration: MP

Pali is a town and a nagar palika in Umaria district in the Indian state of Madhya Pradesh.

== Geography ==
Pali is located at 23.35°N 81.05°E. It has an average elevation of 450 metres (1,476 feet).

== Demographics ==
As of 2001 India census, Pali had a population of 150,868. Males constitute 52% of the population and females 48%. Pali has an average literacy rate of 60%, higher than the national average of 59.5%: male literacy is 70%, and female literacy is 50%. In Pali, 16% of the population is under 6 years of age.

== See also ==
- Umaria District
- Sanjay Gandhi Thermal Power Station
