= Gyan Singh (Indian politician) =

Indian politician from Madhya Pradesh

Gyan Singh (born Kohka in Umaria district, Madhya Pradesh; Hindi pronunciation: [gjaːn̪ sɪŋgʱ]) is an Indian politician from the state of Madhya Pradesh. He was first elected to Lok Sabha in 1996 General Election.

He joined Praja Socialist Party in 1966. He was President of Bharatiya Mazdoor Sangh in 1980–81, and was elected to 7th Vidhan Sabha from Shahdol in 1980 on.

He became Minister of State for Forests and later Minister of State for Jails under Sunder Lal Patwa from 1990 to 1993.

From 2003 to 2016 Singh was elected from Bandhavgarh and was minister for Tribal Welfare in Government of Madhya Pradesh.

Later, in 2016, he was again elected to Lok Sabha from Shahdol-Anuppur parliamentary constituency of Madhya Pradesh on BJP ticket in a by-election when the seat fell vacant due to the death of the sitting MP Dalpat Singh Paraste.
