= South Eastern Coalfields =

Largest coal producing company of India

South Eastern Coalfields Limited (SECL)
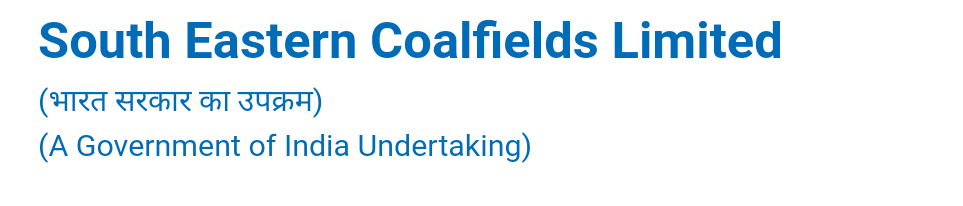
- Company type: State-owned enterprise Public company
- Industry: Mining
- Founded: 1985
- Headquarters: Bilaspur, Chhattisgarh, India
- Area served: India
- Key people: Harish Duhan (Chairman & MD)
- Products: Coal
- Owner: Government of India
- Parent: Coal India Limited
- Website: www.secl-cil.in

South Eastern Coalfields Limited (SECL) is the largest coal producing company of India. It is a "Miniratna" Company, and one of eight fully owned subsidiaries of Coal India Limited. The company has its headquarter at Bilaspur, Chhattisgarh, and 92 mines spread over Chhattisgarh and Madhya Pradesh; 70 underground, 21 opencast, and 1 mixed. It is a schedule 'B' Mini Ratna CPSE in coal & lignite under the administrative control of the Ministry of Coal.

== History ==
South Eastern Coalfields Limited was established in 1985 as part of an administrative reorganization by the Government of India. The formation involved the bifurcation of certain coal mines from Western Coalfields Limited to create SECL, while Central Coalfields Limited was similarly divided to form Northern Coalfields Limited.

As of April 1, 2012, the total geological coal reserve in the South Eastern Coalfields Limited (SECL) command area is 58,253.15 million tons, with 16,076.54 million tons classified as proved reserves. The coal deposits are located within the Son-Mahanadi master basin, spanning six districts in Chhattisgarh—Korba, Raigarh, Surguja, Surajpur, Balrampur, and Korea—and three districts in Madhya Pradesh—Shahdol, Anuppur, and Umaria. The coal reserve in Madhya Pradesh is reported to be 7,407.00 million tons, while in Chhattisgarh, it is 50,846.15 million tons.

== Coalfields Under SECL ==
For effective administrative control and operation, the mines have been grouped in three Coalfields with 13 operating areas -

1. Central India Coalfields (CIC)
  - Chirimiri Area
  - Baikunthpur Area
  - Bishrampur Area
  - Hasdeo Area
  - Bhatgaon Area (Bhatgaon Colliery)
  - Jamuna & Kotma Area
  - Sohagpur Area
  - Johilla Area
2. Korba Coalfields
  - Korba Area
  - Kusmunda Area
  - Dipka Area
  - Gevra Area
3. Mand-Raigarh Coalfields
  - Raigarh Area
