= Dalpat Singh Paraste =

Indian politician

MP
- Constituency: Shahdol

Personal details
- Born: 30 May 1950 Shahdol, Madhya Pradesh
- Died: 1 June 2016 (aged 66) Gurgaon, Haryana
- Party: BJP
- Spouse: Dhana Bai
- Children: 2 sons and 4 daughters
- As of 22 September, 2006

Dalpat Singh Paraste (30 May 1950 – 1 June 2016; Hindi pronunciation: [d̪əlpət̪ sɪŋgʱ pəɾəst̪eː]) was a member of the 14th Lok Sabha of India. He represented the Shahdol constituency of Madhya Pradesh and was a member of the Bharatiya Janata Party political party. He was four times MP from Shahdol.

He was denied ticket by the BJP in the 2009 elections. He died on 1 June 2016 at a Medanta Hospital due to brain hemorrhage in Gurgaon, where he was admitted on 27 May.
