= Bandhavgarh National Park =

National park in Madhya Pradesh, India

- Bandhavgarh Tiger Reserve
- IUCN category II (national park)
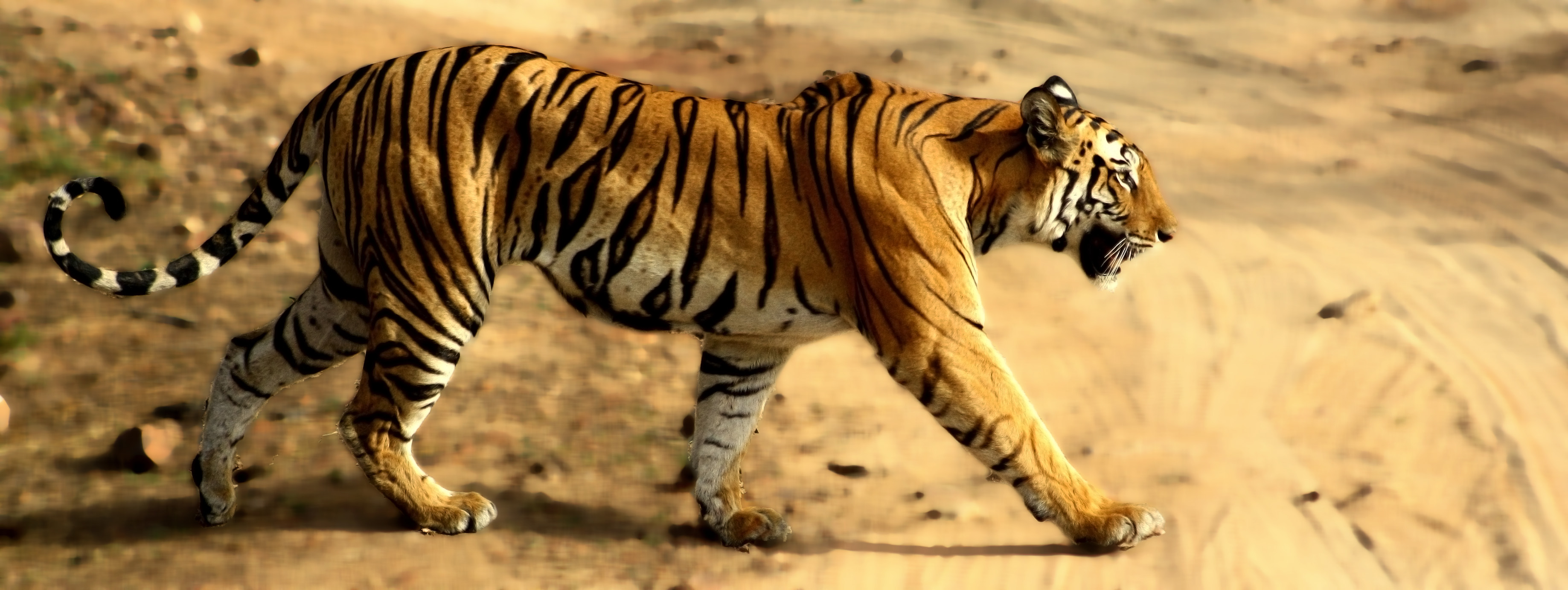
- A tigress in Bandhavgarh National Park

- Location within Madhya Pradesh Location within India
- Interactive map of Bandhavgarh National Park
- Location: Umaria district, Madhya Pradesh, India
- Nearest city: Umaria
- Coordinates: 23°41′58″N 80°57′43″E
- Area: 1,536 km^{2} (593 sq mi)
- Established: 1968 (National Park); 1993 (Tiger Reserve)
- Visitors: 176,051 (in 2022)
- Governing body: Madhya Pradesh Forest Department
- Website: forest.mponline.gov.in/

Bandhavgarh National Park is a national park of India, located in the Umaria district of Madhya Pradesh. It spreads over an area of 105 km^{2} (41 sq mi) and was declared a national park in 1968. It became Tiger Reserve in 1993 with a core area of 716 km^{2} (276 sq mi).

Bandhavgarh was part of the princely state of Rewa, and it was a hunting destination for kings. It is known for the abundance of forest and wild animals, especially tigers.

== Geography ==
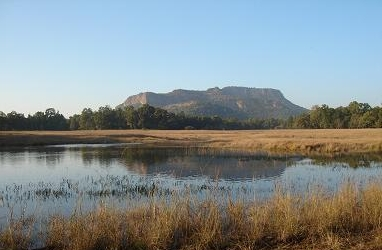
Bandhavgarh Fort

Bandhavgarh National Park is located in the Umaria district of the state of Madhya Pradesh. Bandhavgarh National Park and Panpatha Wildlife Sanctuary form the core area of Bandhavgarh tiger reserve, which spreads over a total area of 716 km^{2} (276 sq mi). The total area of Bandhavgarh Tiger Reserve is 1,536 km^{2} (593 sq mi) including 716 km^{2} (276 sq mi) core and 820 km^{2} (320 sq mi) buffer area.

The three main zones of the national park are Tala, Magdhi and Khitauli. The park derives its name from the Bandhavgarh Fort, which is said to have been given by Lord Rama to his brother Lakshmana to keep a watch on Lanka (Bandhav = Brother, Garh = Fort).

== Flora ==
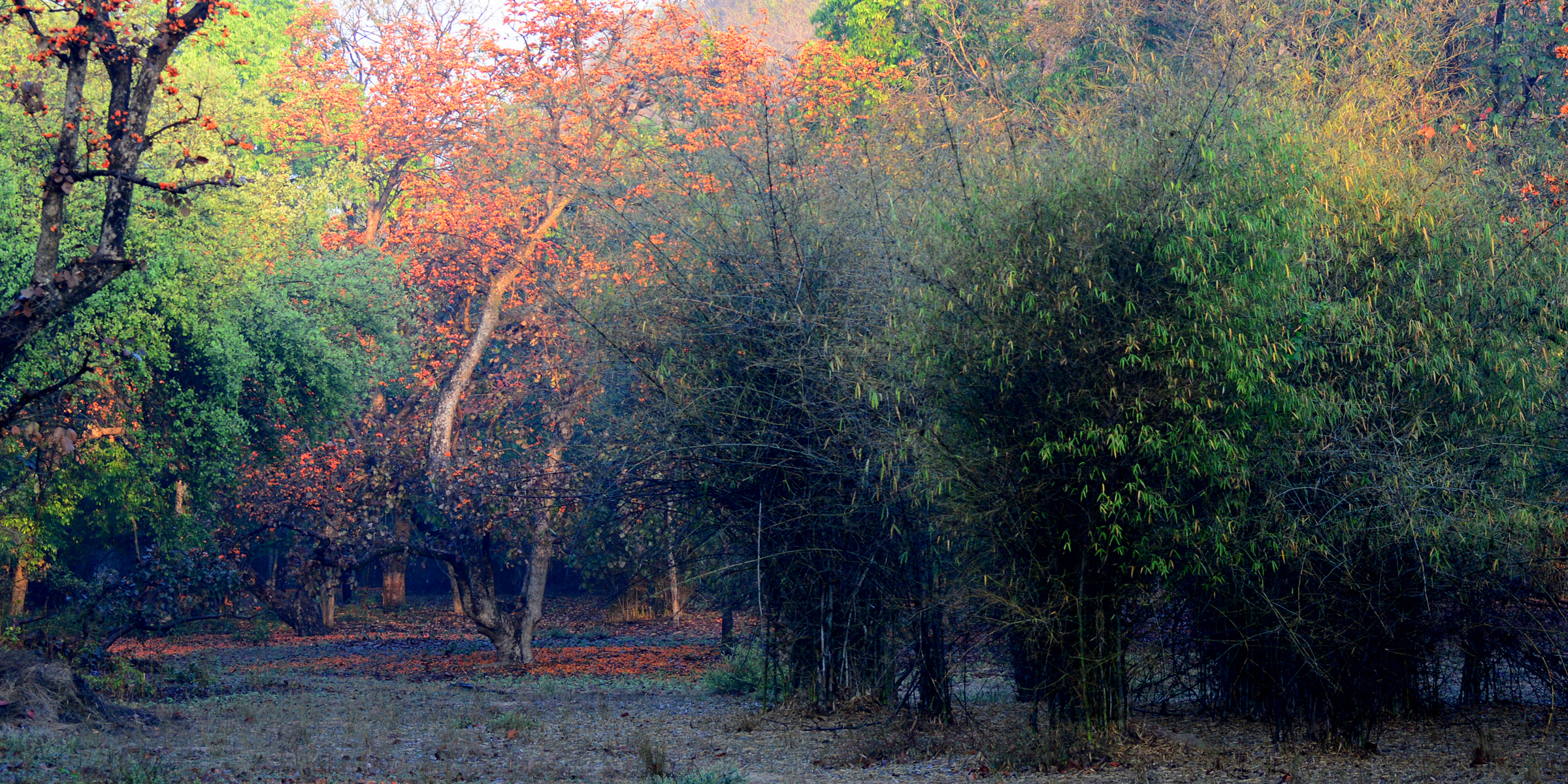
Bamboo forest in Bandhavgarh National Park

The vegitation in Bandhavgarh National Park is moist deciduous forest, sal mixed forest, northern dry mixed deciduous forest, dry deciduous scrub, dry grassland, and west Gangetic moist mixed deciduous forest. It is a predominantly rugged and hilly area with sal and bamboo trees.

== Fauna ==
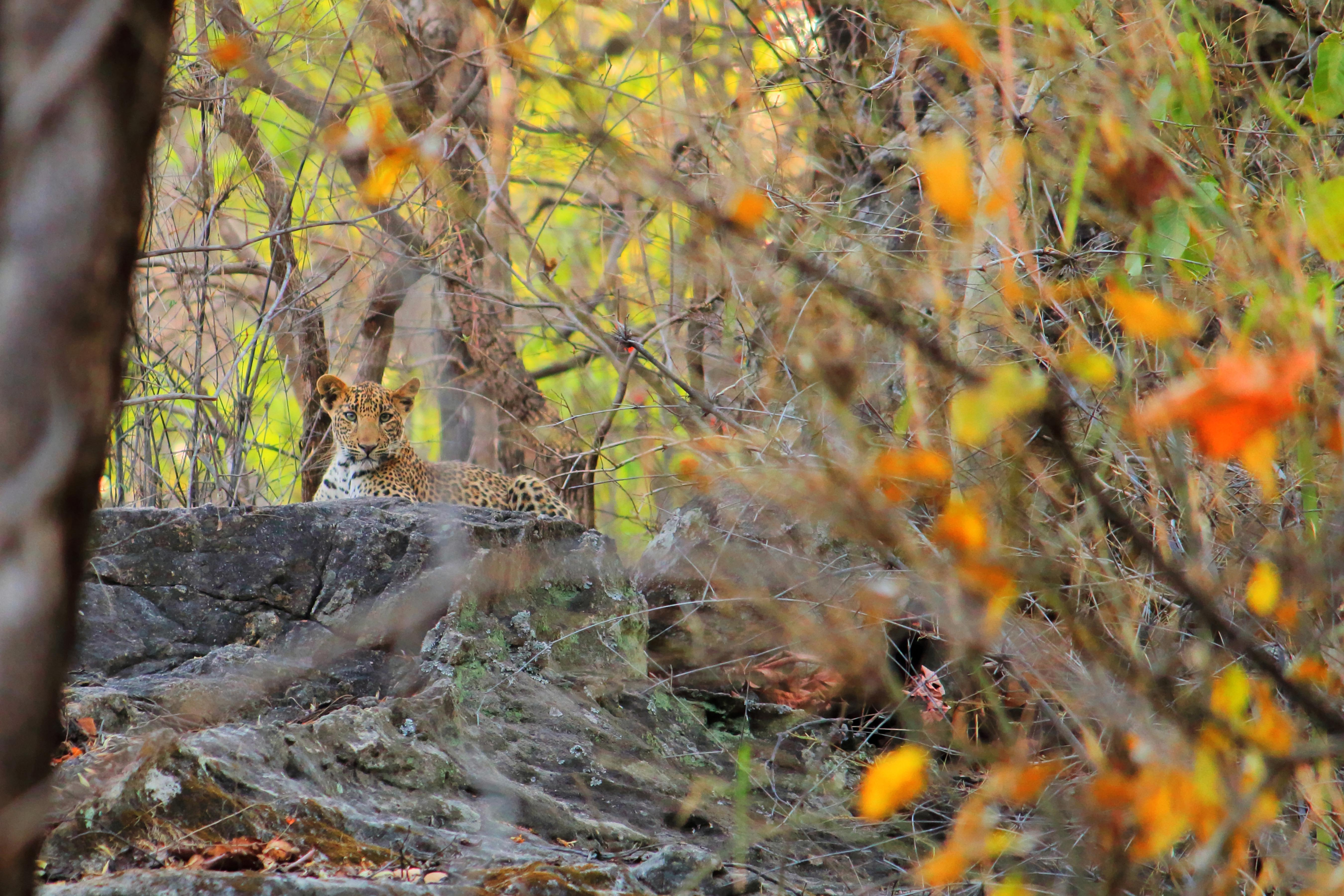
A leopard cub

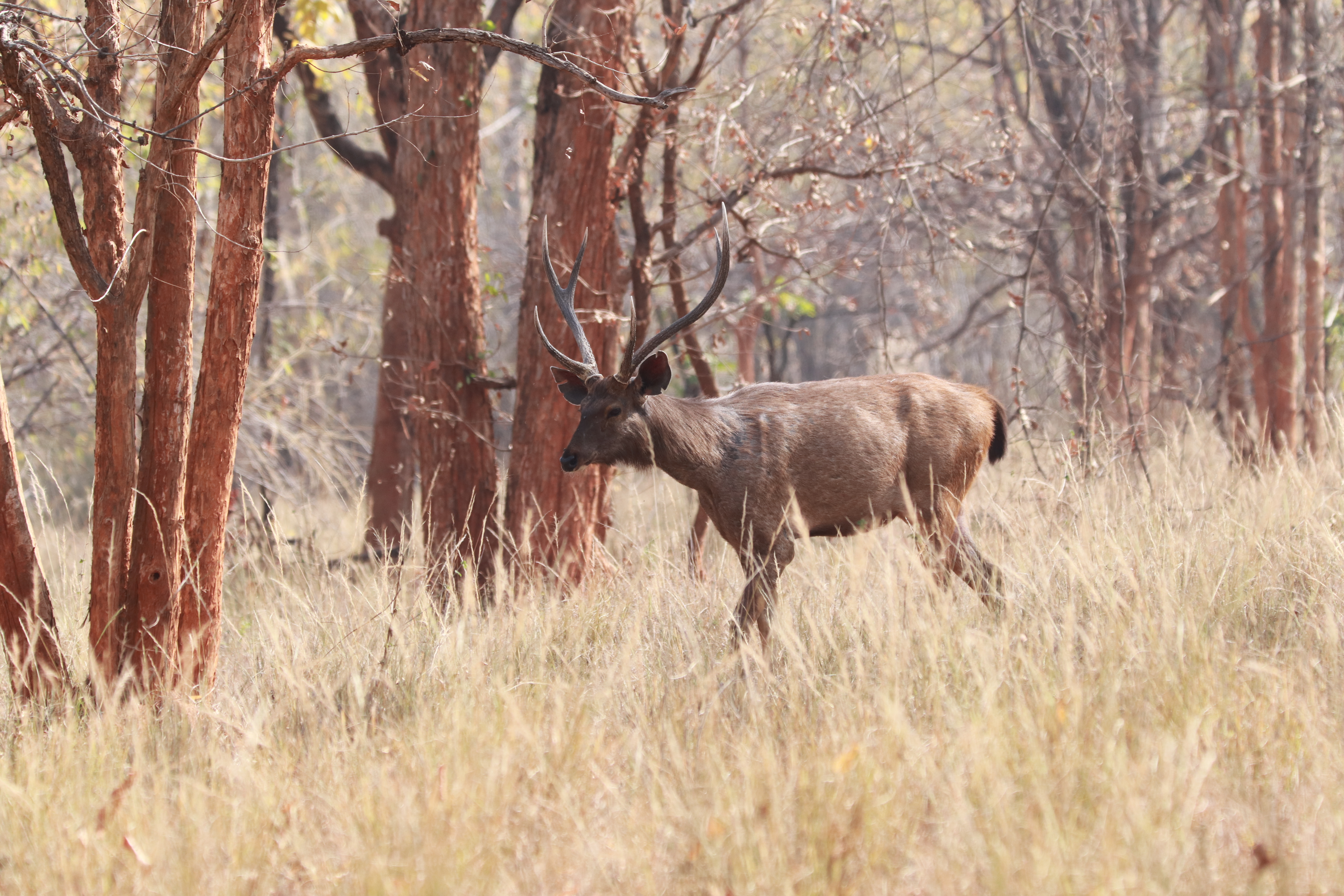
A sambar deer stag

Bandhavgarh National Park is home to variety of wild animals including tiger, leopard, dhole, gaur, chital, sambar, nilgai, chinkara, Northern red muntjac, four-horned antelope, wild boar, sloth bear, striped hyena, Indian wolf, golden jackal, Indian fox, porcupine, jungle cat, Asiatic wildcat, fishing cat and rusty-spotted cat. As per 2022 census, there were 135 tigers in the park.

In 2012, the gaur was reintroduced from Kanha National Park. Bandhavgarh National Park had a small population of gaur, but due to disease passed from cattle to them, all of them died. The project of reintroduction of gaurs dealt with shifting some gaurs from Kanha National Park to Bandhavgarh. 50 animals were transferred in 2012. This project was executed by Madhya Pradesh Forest department, Wildlife Institute of India and Taj Safaris by technical collaboration. In January 2025, there were around 170 gaurs in Bandhavgarh.

In March 2024, there were estimated 55 Indian elephants in Bandhavgarh Tiger Reserve. A herd of 40-45 migrant elephants made their way into the Bandhavgarh from the neighboring state of Chhattisgarh in the summer of 2018. Madhya Pradesh did not have a resident elephant population for over a century until 2018. The last of record was from 1905, in the Amarkantak region of the Anuppur district. In October 2024, a total of 10 elephants died consuming mycotoxins associated with the Kodo millet.

=== Birds ===
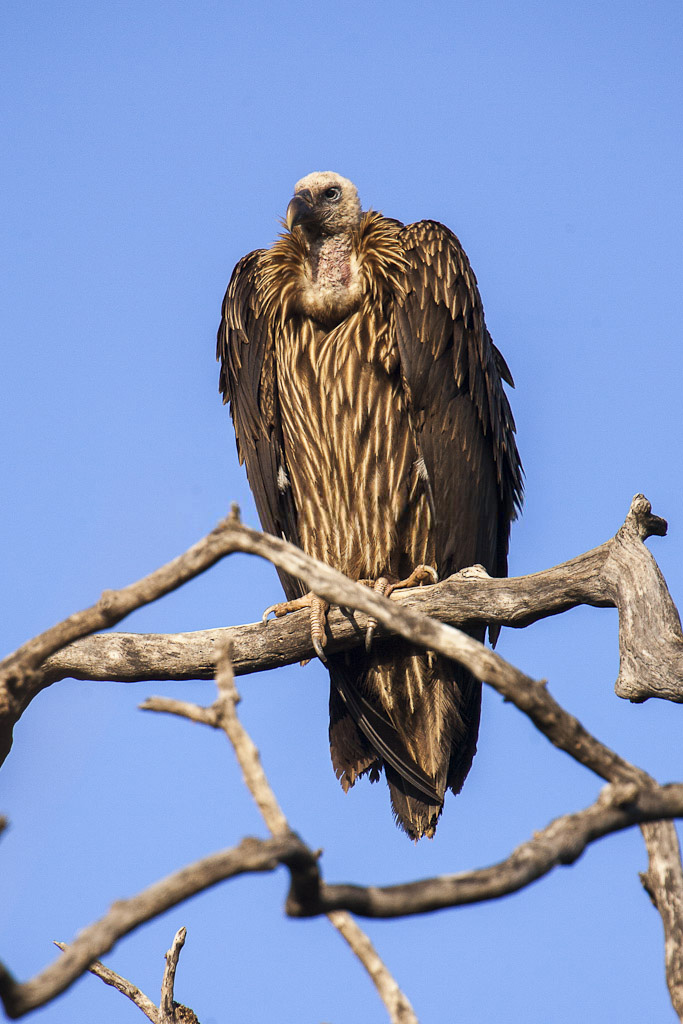
Long-billed vulture

Birds recorded in Bandhavgarh National Park include red jungle fowl, Indian peafowl, Greater coucal, Indian roller, Indian grey hornbill, rock pigeon, common myna, little egret, cattle egret, great egret, black drongo, pond heron, common snipe, Indian robin, large-billed crow, yellow-crowned woodpecker, white-throated kingfisher, common kingfisher, Asian green bee-eater, red-vented bulbul, long-billed vulture, crested serpent eagle, brown fish owl, Malabar pied hornbill, rufous woodpecker, crested hawk eagle, Oriental turtle dove, white-rumped vulture, long-tailed shrike, black ibis, white-necked stork, Tickell's flowerpecker, little cormorant, white-tailed swallow, shikra, jungle myna, lesser spotted eagle, great cormorant, pied kingfisher, Bonelli's eagle, Indian jungle crow, Asian pied starling and duck species.

== Popular culture ==
The BBC documentary Dynasties (2018 TV series) was shot in the Bandhavgarh National Park, which was about four-year long journey of the tigress Raj Bhera.

== See also ==
- Arid Forest Research Institute
- Indian Council of Forestry Research and Education
