= Umaria =

- city
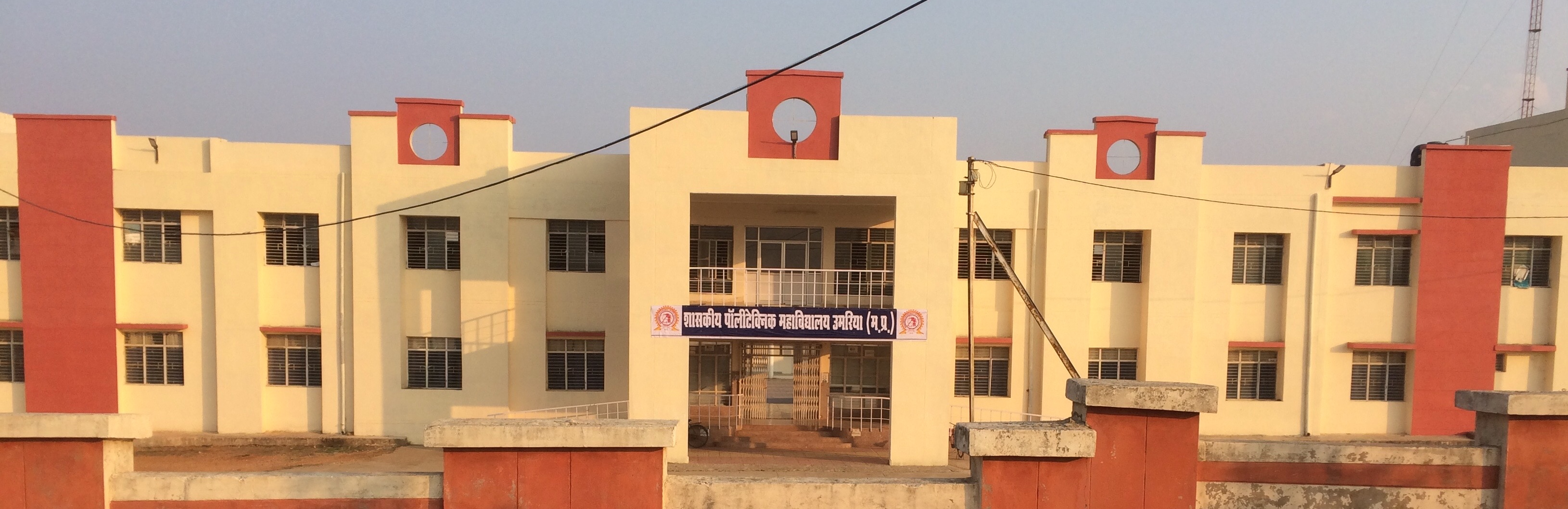
- GPC Umaria

- Location in Madhya Pradesh, India Umaria (India)
- Coordinates: 23°31′30″N 80°50′10″E
- Country: India
- State: Madhya Pradesh
- District: Umaria
- Named for: Umrar river
- Elevation: 538 m (1,765 ft)

Population (2011)
  - Total: 33,114

Languages
  - Official: Hindi
- Time zone: UTC+5:30 (IST)
- Vehicle registration: MP-48
- Sex ratio: 0.891 ♂/♀
- Website: umaria.nic.in

Umaria is a municipality city and administrative headquarter of the Umaria district of the Shahdol Division of Madhya Pradesh, India.

== Geography ==
Umaria is located at 23.42°N 78.63°E and has an average elevation of 538 metres (1,765 feet).

== Climate ==
Climate data for Umaria (1991–2020, extremes 1932–2011)
Month	Jan	Feb	Mar	Apr	May	Jun	Jul	Aug	Sep	Oct	Nov	Dec	Year
Record high °C (°F)	34.4 (93.9)	37.6 (99.7)	41.0 (105.8)	48.7 (119.7)	46.9 (116.4)	46.5 (115.7)	41.5 (106.7)	37.8 (100.0)	37.5 (99.5)	38.0 (100.4)	35.0 (95.0)	32.5 (90.5)	48.7 (119.7)
Mean daily maximum °C (°F)	25.1 (77.2)	28.6 (83.5)	34.1 (93.4)	39.0 (102.2)	41.8 (107.2)	38.1 (100.6)	32.0 (89.6)	30.7 (87.3)	31.6 (88.9)	31.8 (89.2)	29.2 (84.6)	26.6 (79.9)	32.3 (90.1)
Mean daily minimum °C (°F)	6.8 (44.2)	10.0 (50.0)	14.8 (58.6)	19.9 (67.8)	24.1 (75.4)	24.0 (75.2)	21.9 (71.4)	21.0 (69.8)	20.4 (68.7)	16.0 (60.8)	10.7 (51.3)	6.2 (43.2)	16.2 (61.2)
Record low °C (°F)	−0.2 (31.6)	0.4 (32.7)	4.4 (39.9)	10.6 (51.1)	14.0 (57.2)	14.2 (57.6)	13.2 (55.8)	11.0 (51.8)	11.0 (51.8)	6.1 (43.0)	1.0 (33.8)	0.0 (32.0)	−0.2 (31.6)
Average rainfall mm (inches)	19.5 (0.77)	19.9 (0.78)	14.3 (0.56)	10.2 (0.40)	9.7 (0.38)	155.1 (6.11)	326.9 (12.87)	352.8 (13.89)	222.2 (8.75)	29.7 (1.17)	7.7 (0.30)	10.7 (0.42)	1,178.6 (46.40)
Average rainy days	1.4	1.5	1.0	1.1	1.3	7.2	15.4	15.7	9.5	2.0	0.7	0.3	57.1
Average relative humidity (%) (at 17:30 IST)	52	46	34	30	27	51	75	80	75	61	56	51	53
Source: India Meteorological Department

== Demographics ==
According to the latest 2011 census, Umaria has a population of 33,114 divided in 15 wards. Male population is 17,509 and that of female is 15,605. Umaria has an average literacy rate of 84.70 percent, higher than state average of 69.32 percent, male literacy is 91.10 percent, and female literacy is 77.49 percent. In Umaria, 12.34 percent of the population is under 6 years of age. Out of the total population, 10,511 out of which 8,758 are males, engaged in work or business activity.

Scheduled Castes and Scheduled Tribes constitutes 12.82 percent and 18.57 percent of the total population in Umaria.

Religions in Umaria, 2011 Census data
Religion	Percent
Hindus	91.51%
Muslims	7.53%
Others†	0.96%
Distribution of religions † Christians, Sikhs, Buddhists, and Jains.

== Economy ==
- Umaria Coalfield:

The coalfield has an estimated reserve of 181.29 million tonnes, spread across six coal seams. The coals are relatively high in moisture (7-10%) and high in ash (18.6-29.4%). South Eastern Coalfields Limited operates eight mines.

- Sanjay Gandhi Thermal Power Station:

Sanjay Gandhi Thermal Power Station has an installed capacity of 1340.00 MW. The First unit was commissioned in March 1993.

- Agriculture :

District is very backward in the field of agriculture. Tribals of the district prefer the cultivation in the old traditional method. Wheat and Paddy is major Crops of District.

The size of the fields are very small Hence, for the rest part of the year they work on daily wages. Mahua fruit, wood & seeds are source of income for tribe area people.

== Transportation ==
It is situated at a distance of about 69 km. from Shahdol, the parent district. Metalled roads connect the town with Katni, Rewa, Shahdol, etc., on which regular buses ply. Umaria is also a railway station on the Katni-Bilaspur section of the South East Central Railway zone.
