= Umaria district =

- District of Madhya Pradesh
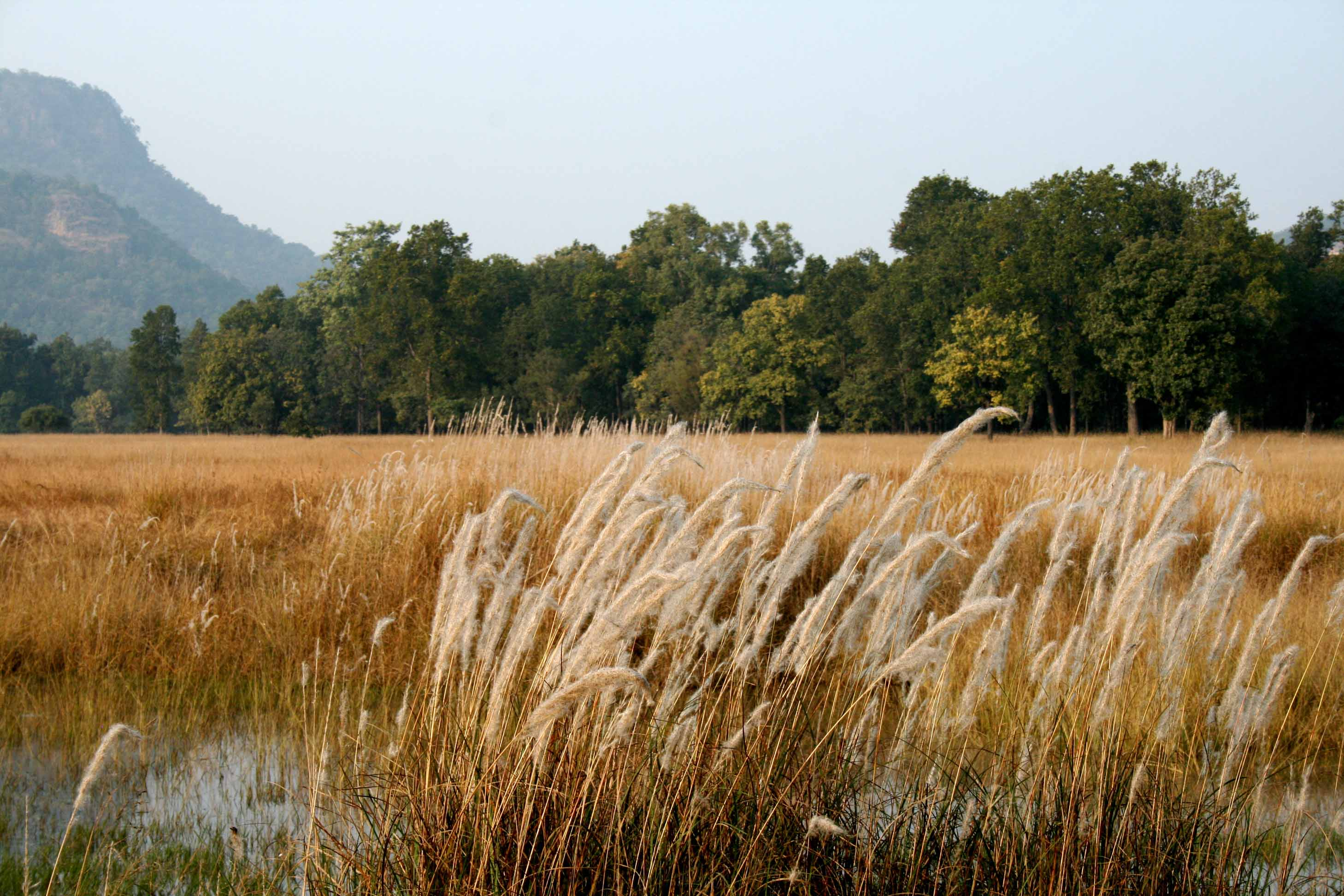
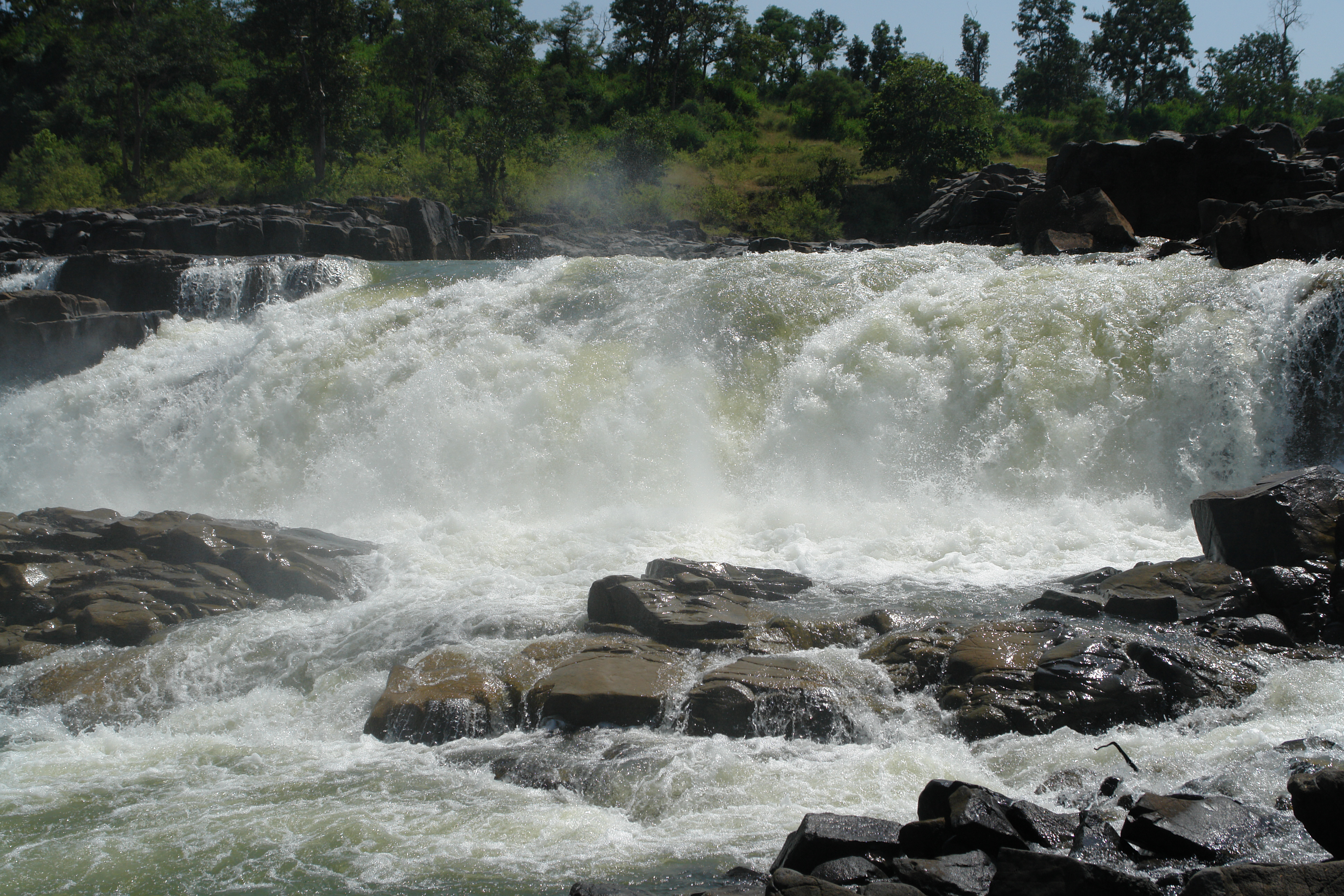
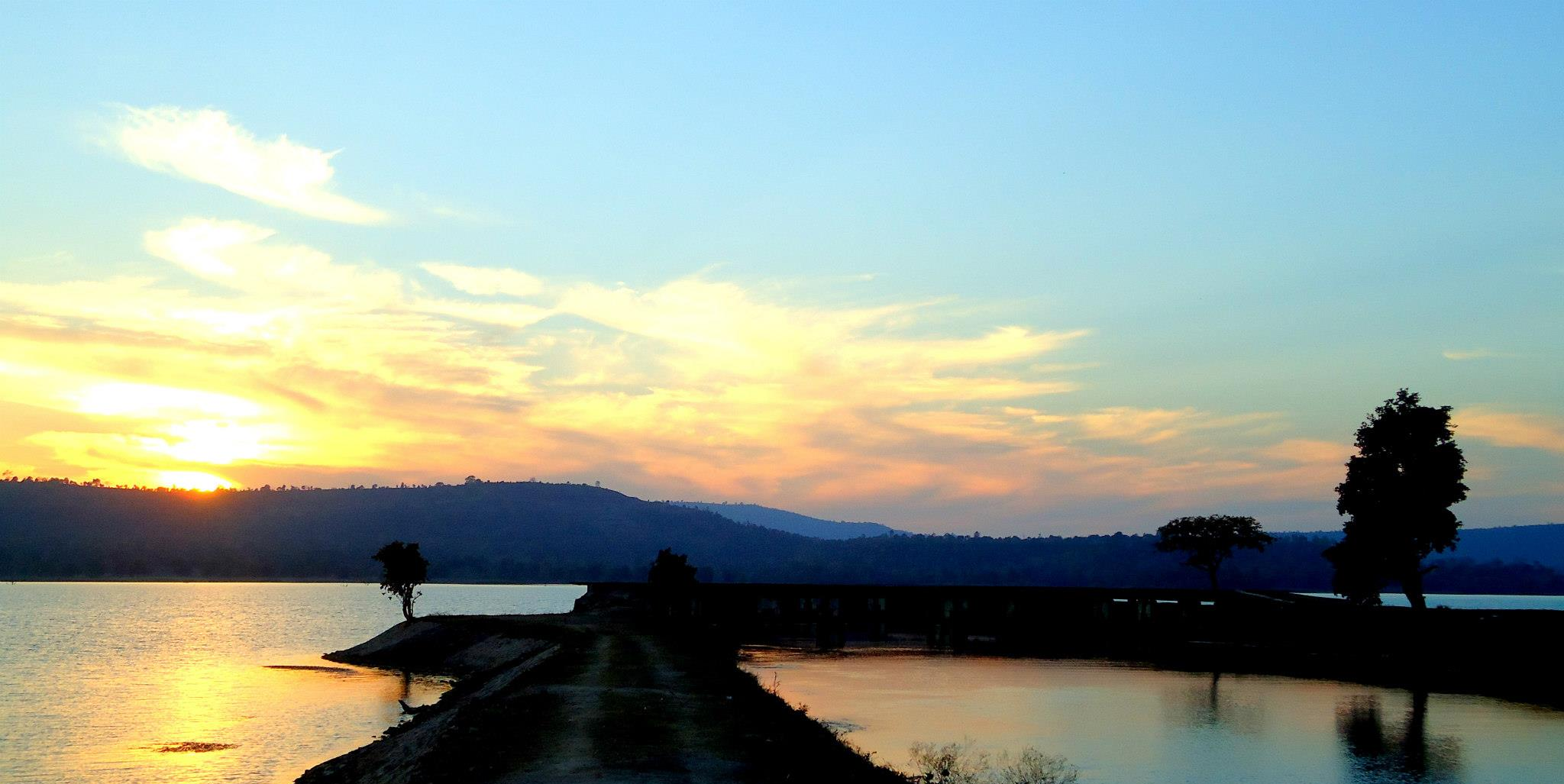
- Top: Waterfall on the Johilla River; Bottom: Bandhavgarh National Park, View of a Beautiful Dam

- Location of Umaria district in Madhya Pradesh
- Coordinates (Umaria): 23.527°N 80.838°E
- Country: India
- State: Madhya Pradesh
- Division: Shahdol
- Headquarters: Umaria

Area
  - Total: 4,548 km^{2} (1,756 sq mi)

Population (2011)
  - Total: 644,758
  - Density: 141.8/km^{2} (367.2/sq mi)

Demographics
  - Literacy: 67.34 per cent
  - Sex ratio: 953
- Time zone: UTC+05:30 (IST)
- Website: umaria.nic.in

Umaria district (Hindi pronunciation: [ʊməɾɪjaː]) is a district of Madhya Pradesh. The town of Umaria is the district headquarters. The district is part of Shahdol Division.

The total geographical area of the district sums up to 4548 square kilometers and has a population of 644,758. Umaria is enriched with its vast resources of forests and minerals. The coal mines are a steady source of revenue for the district.

The most important mineral found in the district is coal and as a result 8 mines are being operated by South Eastern Coalfields Limited (Nowrozabad) in the district. The Bandhavgarh National Park (Tala) and Sanjay Gandhi Thermal Power Station at Mangthar (Pali) are located in the district. Umaria was formerly the headquarters of the South Rewa District and thereafter the headquarters town of the Bandhavgarh tehsil. It is situated at a distance of about 69 km. from Shahdol, the parent district. Metalled roads connect the town with Katni, Rewa, Shahdol, etc., on which regular buses ply. Umaria is also a railway station on the Katni-Bilaspur section of the South East Central Railway zone.

As of 2011 it is the second least populous district of Madhya Pradesh (out of 50), after Harda.

== History ==
Umaria was ruled by Lodhi Rajputs. The Lodhi Rajput family built the temple of Lakshmi Narayan on southern bank of Narbada Barman ghat. They also built on the steps of the northern bank of Barman ghat Karkeli a great gateway called the Hathi Darwaza, to allow their elephants passage. The fort of Bandhavgarh was given as dowry with Padamkuwari, daughter of Somdutt Karchuli of Mandla to Karan Deo, son of Maharaja Vyaghradev. Bandhogarh was the early capital of the Baghel dynasty. Akbar spent his childhood days in Bandhogarh.

Later the Baghels of Rewa came with his force and won Umaria from Lodhis. Umaria was always a favourite town for many princes and kings because the dense forests and tigers. It was the southern capital of old Rewa District under the former Bandhogarh tehsil. The forests of Bandhavgarh were a game reserve of Maharaja of Rewa.

After independence, Umaria was a part of Shahdol district. In 1998, it was carved out of Shahdol as a separate district.

== Climate ==
Average Rainfall : 1293 m.m.

Average Max. Temperature :46.2 °C

Average Min. Temperature : -0.1 °C

== Sub Divisions ==
1. Umaria
2. Chandia
3. Pali
4. Naurojabad
5. Manpur

== Economy ==
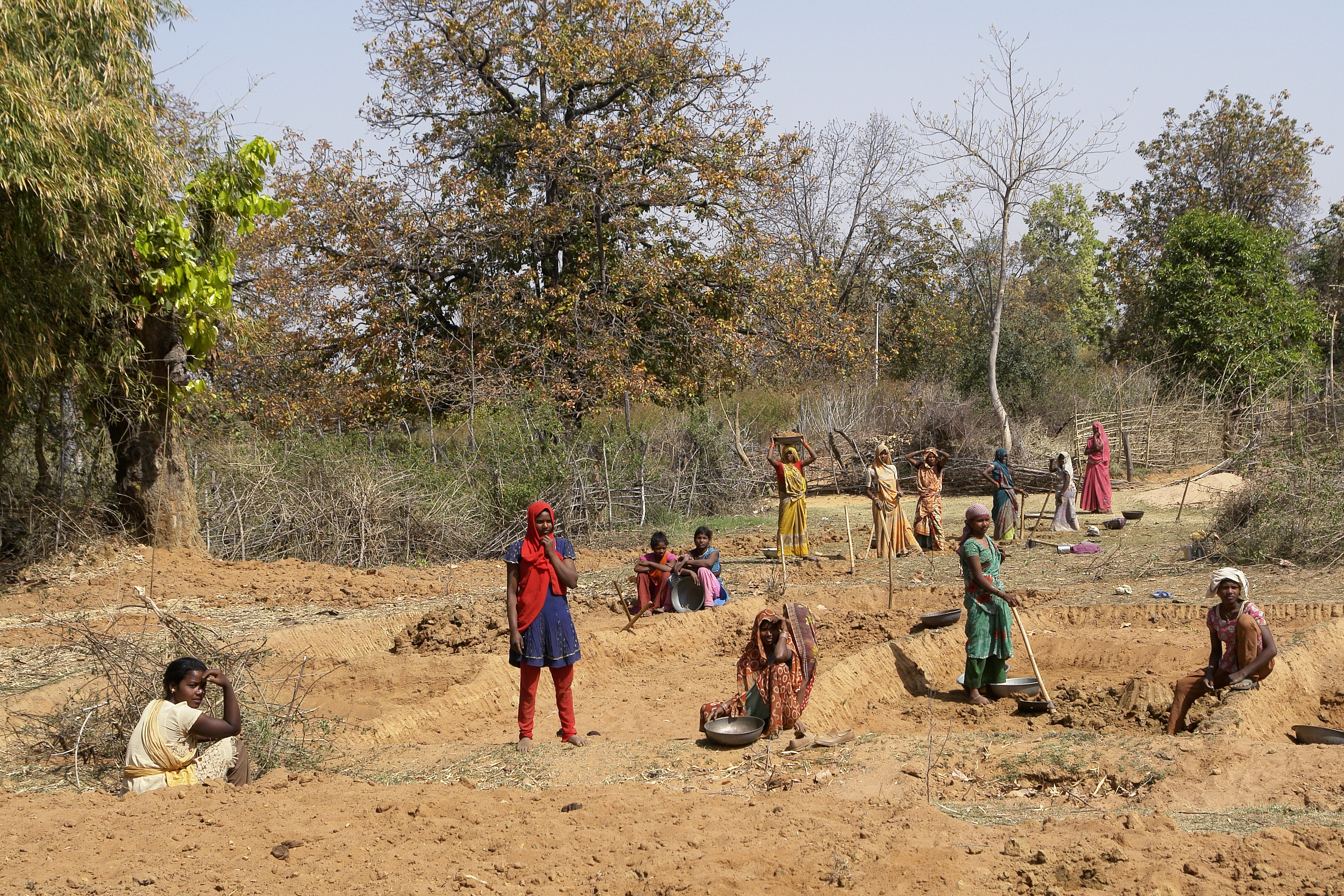
Women working on road, Umaria district

In 2006 the Ministry of Panchayati Raj named Umaria one of the country's 250 most backward districts (out of a total of 640). It is one of the 24 districts in Madhya Pradesh currently receiving funds from the Backward Regions Grant Fund Programme (BRGF).

== Demographics ==
Historical population
| Year | Pop. | ±% p.a. |
|---|---|---|
| 1901 | 94,216 | — |
| 1911 | 107,749 | +1.35% |
| 1921 | 100,086 | −0.74% |
| 1931 | 120,599 | +1.88% |
| 1941 | 137,759 | +1.34% |
| 1951 | 150,720 | +0.90% |
| 1961 | 201,898 | +2.97% |
| 1971 | 242,341 | +1.84% |
| 1981 | 319,231 | +2.79% |
| 1991 | 420,815 | +2.80% |
| 2001 | 515,963 | +2.06% |
| 2011 | 644,758 | +2.25% |

According to the 2011 census Umaria District has a population of 644,758, roughly equal to the nation of Montenegro or the US state of Vermont. This gives it a ranking of 513th in India (out of a total of 640). The district has a population density of 158 inhabitants per square kilometre (410/sq mi). Its population growth rate over the decade 2001-2011 was 24.73%. Umaria has a sex ratio of 953 females for every 1000 males, and a literacy rate of 67.34%. 17.15% of the population lives in urban areas. Scheduled Castes and Scheduled Tribes made up 9.02% and 46.64% of the population respectively. The Gonds make up the largest tribal group, accounting for 40% of the total ST population. Other important tribes include the Baigas and Kols.

Religions in Umaria district (2011)
| Religion | Percent |
| Hinduism | 96.33% |
| Islam | 2.48% |
| Other (tribal religion) | 0.93% |
| Other or not stated | 0.26% |

Hindus are the largest group in the district with 96.33%. Muslims are 2.48% and traditional tribal religions were 0.93%.

=== Languages ===
Languages of Umaria district (2011)
1. Hindi (83.6%)
2. Bagheli (14.4%)
3. Gondi (0.94%)
4. Others (1.05%)

At the time of the 2011 Census of India, 83.58% of the population in the district spoke Hindi, 14.43% Bagheli and 0.94% Gondi as their first language.

== Bandhavgarh National Park ==
Bandhavgarh (The ancient Name is Bandhogarh) is a relatively small park. In the last few years this former game reserve has become one of India's most prominent National Parks. The major reason for all the interest is Bandhavgarh high density of tigers, which roam the mixed forests of sal, bamboo and ambilica officinale in search of an easy kill. The tigers have not only bolstered the local population by breeding successfully, they have also brought international media attention to the park and to the plight of the Royal Bengal Tiger. The density of the tiger population at Bandhavgarh is the highest known in India. 60 Tigers at 450 km^{2} area in Bandhavgarh National Park. This is also white tiger country. The last known as captured by Maharaja Martand Singh in 1951. This white tiger, named "Mohan," is now stuffed and display in the place of Maharaja of Rewa.

== Attractions ==
=== Bandhavgarh Fort ===
Bandhavgarh is the name of tehsil in Umaria District. Formerly it was the capital of the Bandhavgarh Kingdom of the Magha dynasty, then the headquarters of the tehsil. At present its headquarters is Umaria.

The fort of Bandhavgarh is a place of considerable archaeological and historical importance.

It is a natural impregnable fort and stands on a hill, at an attitude of about 2,430 m (7,970 ft) above sea-level. The Bamnia hill is also a part of the fort, because it is enclosed by a rampart. The fort is on the Rewa-Uma-Katni road at a distance of about 41 km (25 mi) from Umaria Town.

Nowrozabad

Naurozabad city (Johila area) is enriched by the coal deposits found in the area. Coal industrial sector has developed in this area due to the proximity of coal mines. The most prestigious government undertaking and the largest coal producing industry in India, South Eastern Coalfields Limited is located in this area. Nowrozabad is one of the 13 administrative regions of the coal industry. It is the head office of Johila region. The major employment source in the city is the coal mines of the South Eastern Coal Fields Limited. This is a city situated on the banks of the Johila river.

=== Chandia ===
Chandia is on the Umaria-Katni road, 21 km (13 mi) from Umaria. The railway station of Chandia Road, known as Chandia railway station.

The most important spot of Chandia is a small temple, enshrining Goddess Kalika. Her mouth is wide open, but her out-stretched tongue is broken. There is also an old temple of god Rama and his consort Janaki. It was a thikana (state or estate) of Thakur of Chandia. A small fair meets at Suraswahi Chandia for three days in February/March, on the occasion of Shivaratri. There is a Fort Chandia of Baghels.

=== Pali Birsinghpur ===
Pali Birsinghpur is situated on the Umaria-Shahdol road, at a distance of about 36 km (22 mi) from Umaria. Another road goes from Pali to Mandla via Dindori. This place is famous for Maa Birasini Devi Temple. Pali is also a railway station, and there is a rest house for the tourists to stay. The station is known as the Pali-Birsinghpur station. Near the railway station there is a temple, enshrining Maa Birasini Devi Temple. By popular belief she is Goddess Kali, represented here as skeleton Goddess, but with her mouth closed. Many remains of old Jain idols kept here in some Hindu temples. The annual fairs are held both in October and March, on the occasion of Navaratri, near the temple of Goddess.

=== Umaria town ===
The headquarters town of the Umaria district and Bandhavgarh tehsil, formerly Umaria was the headquarters of the South Rewa District. It is situated at a distance of about 69 km (43 mi) from Shahdol.

Near the railway station stands a Shiva temple, known as the Sagara temple. It was an old shrine, recently remodeled. Its main gates are still intact with stone statues, carved in Khajuraho models. Near about is Jwalamukhi temple. About 6.5 km (4.0 mi) from the town, there is another temple named Madhibag temple of Mahabharata era, with similar carvings of the Khajuraho pattern.

Umaria is known for its coal-mines, which were opened in 1881 by the Government of India and transferred to the Rewa Darbar in the same year, mainly to meet the requirement of railway at Katni.

=== Baderi ===
Baderi is a gram panchayat in Umaria district. It is situated about 5 km (3.1 mi) from Umaria in Bandhavgarh Road.

It was an estate under Rewah Riyasat. It was ruled by Baghela rajputs. There is Nand Mahal and Baderi Fort, dates back to 17th century. Nand Mahal was built by the Baghela chief, Lal Ahlad Singh in 1750s and Baderi Fort was half built by Lodhi rajputs, later on conquered and constructed by Lal Ramnat Singh in 1850s.

=== Manpur ===
Manpur is a block and the biggest tehsil in umaria district. It is situated about 45 km (28 mi) from district headquarter and about 12 km (7.5 mi) from Bandhavgarh National Park in Tala-Jaisinghnagar road. There are 84 Gram Panchayats in Manpur tehsil.

=== Mangthar Dam (Birsinghpur Reservoir) ===
Birsinghpur Reservoir is located 12–13 km (7.5–8.1 mi) from Birsinghpur Pali Railway Station. This reservoir is constructed for Sanjay Gandhi Thermal Power Station. This reservoir is constructed on Johila river, which originates near Amarkantak in Anuppur district of Madhya Pradesh. Johila River is a tributary of the Son River, which is the second largest tributary of the Ganga river from the southern banks.

== Tourist places ==
- Bandhavgarh National Park
- Panpatha Wildlife Sanctuary
- CHANDIA KHAS
- PALI BIRSINGHPUR
- UMARIA TOWN
- THE CAVES
- BADERI
- MANPUR
