= List of major rivers of India =

Indian rivers

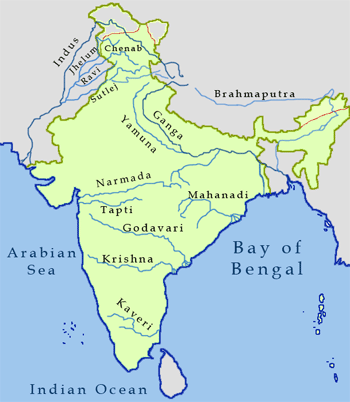
Map of India showing the major rivers.

With a land area of 3,287,263 km^{2} (1,269,219 sq mi) consisting of diverse ecosystems, India has many river systems and perennial streams. The rivers of India can be classified into four groups – Himalayan, Deccan, Coastal, and Inland drainage. The Himalayan rivers, mainly fed by glaciers and snow melt, arise from the Himalayas. The Deccan rivers system consists of rivers in Peninsular India, that drain into the Bay of Bengal and the Arabian Sea. There are numerous short coastal rivers, predominantly on the West coast. There are few inland rivers, which do not drain into sea.

Most rivers in India originate from four major watersheds in India. The Himalayan watershed is the source of water for the major river systems in India including the three longest rivers – the Ganges, the Brahmaputra and the Indus. These three river systems are fed by more than 5000 glaciers. The Aravalli Range in the north-west serves the origin of few of the rivers such as the Chambal, the Banas and the Luni rivers.

The Narmada and Tapti rivers originate from the Vindhya and Satpura ranges in Central India. In the peninsular India, majority of the rivers originate from the Western Ghats and flow towards the Bay of Bengal, while only a few rivers flow from east to west from the Eastern Ghats to the Arabian sea. This is because of the difference in elevation of the Deccan Plateau, which slopes gently from the west to the east. The largest of the peninsular rivers include the Godavari, the Krishna, the Mahanadi and the Kaveri.

== River systems ==
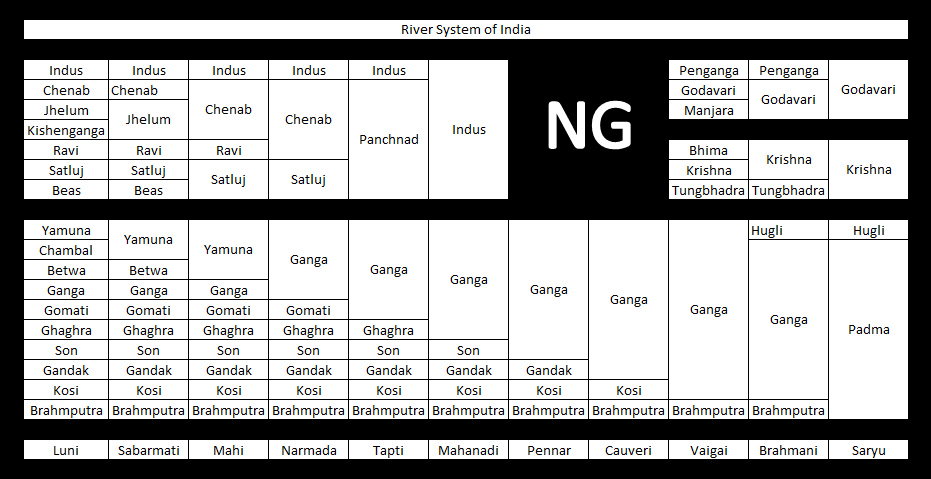
Chart showing the major river systems of India along with the tributaries and distributaries of some of them.

As per the classification of Food and Agriculture Organization, the rivers systems are combined into 20 river units, which includes 14 major rivers systems and 99 smaller river basins grouped into six river units. The Ganges-Brahmaputra-Meghna basin is the largest, which covers 34% of the land area and contributes to nearly 59% of the available water resources.

River unit	Region	Draining into	Catchment area (% of land area)	Average annual runoff (km^{3})	Surface water (km^{3})
Ganges-Brahmaputra-Meghna	North-east	Bangladesh	34.0	610.62	294.0
Other North-east rivers	North-east	Bangladesh, Myanmar	1.1	31.0	
Subarnarekha	North-east	Bay of Bengal	0.9	12.4	
Brahmani-Baitarani	North-east	Bay of Bengal	1.6	28.5	6.8
Mahanadi	Central-east	Bay of Bengal	4.4	66.9	18.3
East flowing rivers between Mahanadi and Pennar	Central-east	Bay of Bengal	2.7	22.5	19.0
Godavari	Central	Bay of Bengal	9.7	110.5	50
Krishna	Central	Bay of Bengal	8.0	78.1	76.3
Pennar	South-east	Bay of Bengal	1.7	6.3	58.0
East flowing rivers between Pennar and Kanyakumari	South-east	Bay of Bengal	3.1	16.5	13.1
Kaveri	South	Bay of Bengal	2.5	21.4	6.9
West flowing rivers between Tadri and Kanyakumari	South-west	Arabian Sea	1.7	113.5	16.7
West flowing rivers between Tapti and Tadri	Southwest	Arabian Sea	1.7	87.4	24.3
Tapti	Central-west	Arabian Sea	2.0	14.9	11.9
Narmada	Central-west	Arabian Sea	3.1	45.6	14.5
Mahi	North-west	Arabian Sea	1.1	11.0	34.5
Sabarmati	North-west	Arabian Sea	0.7	3.8	3.1
West flowing rivers between Kutch and Saurashtra	North-west	Arabian Sea	10.0	15.1	1.9
Rajasthan inland basin	North-east	None	Negligible	Negligible	15.0
Indus tributaries	North-west	Pakistan	10	73.3	46.0

== List of rivers ==
Major rivers of India
Rank	River	Image	Length (km)	Origin	Outflow	Major tributaries	States/UT
1	Indus		3,180	Himalayas	Arabian Sea	Panjnad, (Note: The Jhelum and Ravi join the Chenab, the Beas River joins the Sutlej. Later the Chenab joins with the Sutlej to form the Panjnad River, which merges with the Indus.) Shyok, Dras, Zanskar	Ladakh, Gujarat (Note: The Indus River Delta is mostly in the Sindh province of Pakistan with a small portion in the Kutch Region of India.)
2	Brahmaputra		2,880	Himalayas	Bay of Bengal (Note: Brahmaputra splits into two distributaries with the western branch merging with the lower Ganga to form the Padma River and the eastern branch joining with the Meghna River. The Padma and Meghna rivers converge to form the Ganges Delta and flow out into the Bay of Bengal.)	Lhasa, Lohit, Subansiri, Teesta	Arunachal Pradesh, Assam
3	Ganges		2,525	Himalayas	Bay of Bengal	Yamuna, Ghaghara, Gomti, Gandaki, Kosi, Son	Uttarakhand, Uttar Pradesh, Bihar, Jharkhand, West Bengal
4	Godavari		1,465	Western Ghats	Bay of Bengal	Manjira, Indravati, Sabari, Purna	Maharashtra, Telangana, Andhra Pradesh
5	Satluj		1,450	Himalayas	Indus	Chenab, Beas	Himachal Pradesh, Punjab
6	Krishna		1,400	Western Ghats	Bay of Bengal	Bhima, Tungabhadra, Ghataprabha	Maharashtra, Karnataka, Telangana, Andhra Pradesh
7	Yamuna		1,376	Himalayas	Ganges	Chambal, Betwa, Ken	Uttarakhand, Uttar Pradesh, Haryana, Delhi
8	Narmada		1,312	Vindhya and Satpura	Arabian Sea	Kolar, Sher, Tawa	Madhya Pradesh, Maharashtra, Gujarat
9	Ghagara		1,080	Himalayas	Ganges	Seti, Bheri	Uttar Pradesh, Bihar
10	Chambal		1,024	Vindhya and Satpura	Ganges	Banas, Parbati, Shipra	Madhya Pradesh, Rajasthan, Uttar Pradesh
11	Mahanadi		900	Eastern Ghats	Bay of Bengal	Hasdeo, Seonath, Jonk, Ong River, Prachi	Chhattisgarh, Odisha
12	Chenab		890	Himalayas	Sutlej	Ravi, Jhelum, Tawi	Himachal Pradesh, Jammu and Kashmir
13	Kaveri		805	Western Ghats	Bay of Bengal	Amaravati, Hemavati, Bhavani, Noyyal	Karnataka, Tamil Nadu
14	Son		784	Vindhya and Satpura	Ganges	Gopad, Rihand, Kanhar	Chhattisgarh, Madhya Pradesh, Uttar Pradesh, Jharkhand, Bihar
15	Jhelum		729	Himalayas	Chenab	Poonch, Lidder, Neelum	Jammu and Kashmir
16	Ravi		720	Himalayas	Chenab		Himachal Pradesh, Punjab
17	Kosi		720	Himalayas	Ganges	Sun Kosi, Arun, Tamur	Uttarakhand, Uttar Pradesh, Bihar

== See also ==
- Indian Rivers Inter-link
