= List of islands created since the 20th century =

Below is a list of new islands created since the beginning of the 20th century by volcanism, erosion, glacial retreat, or other mechanisms, excluding artificial islands. One of the most famous new volcanic islands is the small island of Surtsey, located in the Atlantic Ocean south of Iceland. It first emerged from the ocean surface in 1963. Two years later, Surtsey was declared a nature reserve for the study of ecological succession; plants, insects, birds, seals, and other forms of life have since established themselves on the island.

Another noted new island is Anak Krakatau (lit. 'child of Krakatoa'), which formed in the flooded caldera of the Krakatoa volcano in Indonesia), which emerged only in 1930. Ample rainforests have grown there, although they are often destroyed by frequent eruptions. A population of many wild animals, including insects, birds, humanborne rats, and even monitor lizards, have also settled there.

Didicas Volcano off the northern coast of Luzon Island in the Philippines, was first created during a four-year eruption from 1856 to 1860 but eventually got washed away. In 1900, three tall rock masses were left by another eruption. During the 1952 eruption, the island finally became permanent which was further bolstered by subsequent eruptions in 1969 and 1978 into a 228 metres (748 ft)-high island.

Uunartoq Qeqertoq is an island off the east coast of Greenland that appeared to have split from the mainland because of glacial retreat between 2002 and 2005; however, it is believed to have been a true island, with or without glacial covering, for many thousands of years.

In February and March 2009, a vigorous eruption created a new island near Hunga Ha'apai in the Tongan Islands of the southwest Pacific. By the end of the activity, however, the new land mass was connected to Hunga Ha'apai. Similar activity occurred again in December 2014 and January 2015. The island has been re-separated after most of the mass of Hunga Ha'apai was destroyed during the massive 2022 eruption.

In December 2011, an island was formed in the Zubair Group as a result of volcanic activity but got eroded away in February 2015. Another island which surfaced formed in September 2013 which was named Jadid Island, whereas the one that formed in 2011 was named Sholan Island.

On September 24, 2013, a new island named Zalzala Koh emerged off the coast of Gwadar, as a result of a strong earthquake that hit south and southwest Pakistan measuring 7.8 on the Richter magnitude scale.

On November 21, 2013, an unnamed islet emerged off the coast of Nishinoshima, a small, uninhabited island in the Ogasawara chain, which is also known as the Bonin Islands. Less than four days after the new islet's emergence, it was about 200 metres (660 ft) in diameter.

In November 2023, a new island formed as a result of volcanic activity off the coast of Iwo Jima, reaching a diameter of 100 meters.

== List of recently created islands ==
This is a list of new islands that formed during the 20th and the 21st centuries. Of those formed by submarine volcanoes, only Anak Krakatau and Surtsey are currently islands, and Surtsey is the only one that is expected to survive, Ilha Nova is now connected to Faial Island. Newly created landmass adjacent to Nishinoshima is now connected to Nishinoshima.

| Name of the island | Country | Land formation year(s) |
|---|---|---|
| Nishinoshima | Japan | 2023 |
| Hunga Tonga–Hunga Haʻapai | Tonga | 2022 |
| Fukutoku-Okanoba | Japan | 2021–2022, 1986, 1974–75, 1914, 1904–05 |
| Metis Shoal | Tonga | 2019, 1995–2019, 1979, 1967–1968 1878-1898 |
| Horseshoe Island | United States | 2018 |
| Shelly Island | United States | 2017–2018 |
| Shingle Island | United Kingdom | 2016 |
| Hunga Tonga-Hunga Ha'apai | Tonga | 2014–15, 2009 |
| Jadid Island | Yemen | 2013 |
| Nishinoshima Shintō | Japan | 2013–15, 1973–74 |
| Zalzala Koh | Pakistan | 2013; disappeared 2016 |
| Sholan Island | Yemen | 2011 |
| Sif Island | Antarctica | early 2010s |
| Malan Island | Pakistan | 2010, 2004, 1999 |
| Bhasan Char | Bangladesh | 2006 |
| Didicas Volcano | Philippines | 1856–1860, 1900, 1952 |
| Home Reef | Tonga | 2022, 2006, 1984 |
| Uunartoq Qeqertaq | Greenland | 2005 |
| Norderoogsand | Germany | 1999 |
| Kavachi | Solomon Islands | 1999–2003, 1991, 1986, 1978, 1976, 1969–70, 1965, 1963–64, 1961, 1958, 1952–53 |
| Blomstrandøya | Norway | 1991 |
| Kuwae | Vanuatu | 1974, 1971, 1959, 1949, 1948, 1923–25 |
| Jólnir | Iceland | 1965–66 |
| Surtsey | Iceland | 1963–67 |
| Tigres Island | Angola | 1962 |
| Timoteo Domínguez | Uruguay | 1961 |
| Sandy Point | Canada | 1960s |
| Ilha Nova (Capelinhos) | Portugal | 1957–58 |
| Myōjin-shō | Japan | 1952–53, 1946 |
| Shōwa Iōjima | Japan | 1934 |
| Anak Krakatau | Indonesia | 1927–30 |
| Fonuafo'ou | Tonga | 1927–28 |
| Banua Wuhu | Indonesia | 1918–19, 1904 |
| Ferdinandea (Graham) island | Italy | 1831–1832 |

== See also ==
- Severnaya Zemlya, the last sizeable islands to be discovered
