= Chak Sarai =

Village in Punjab, India

Coordinates: 30°47′55″N 76°05′15″E

Chak Sarai (Punjabi: ਚੱਕ ਸਰਾਏ) is a village in Ludhiana district of the Indian state of Punjab. The people speak the Punjabi language. It is 3 km from the Delhi–Amritsar highway and 77 km from the state capital. Doraha is the nearest city, with two international restaurants, McDonald's and Subway, alongside Cafe Coffee Day.

Most of the families are from an agricultural background. Multinational company Coca-Cola is located near the village including some other factories like Ganga textile, Arisudana textiles and DFL-Unbrako. There are many villagers who migrate to foreign countries. Most of them go to Canada or to America, Australia and Europe.

The population of the village is 1544, with a 70% literacy rate. Present sarpanch is Mr. Sukhdev Singh Bittu and Ex panch Sr. Darshan Singh Deol. Most of the people belong to Deol Jatt Sikh. The village contains two gurudwaras, one mosque and one temple. There is a large grain market and rice mill located in the village.
