= Ephemerality =

Quality of existing only briefly

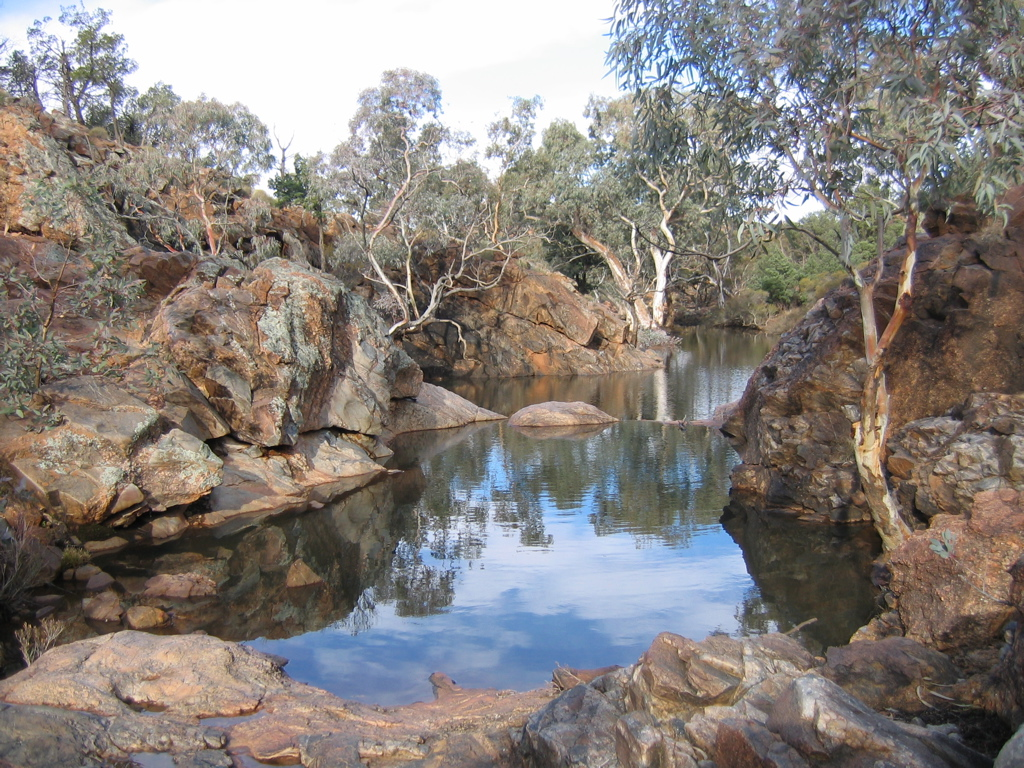
The ephemeral nature of Granite Plateau Creek on the Mawson Plateau means the creek is usually a series of waterholes

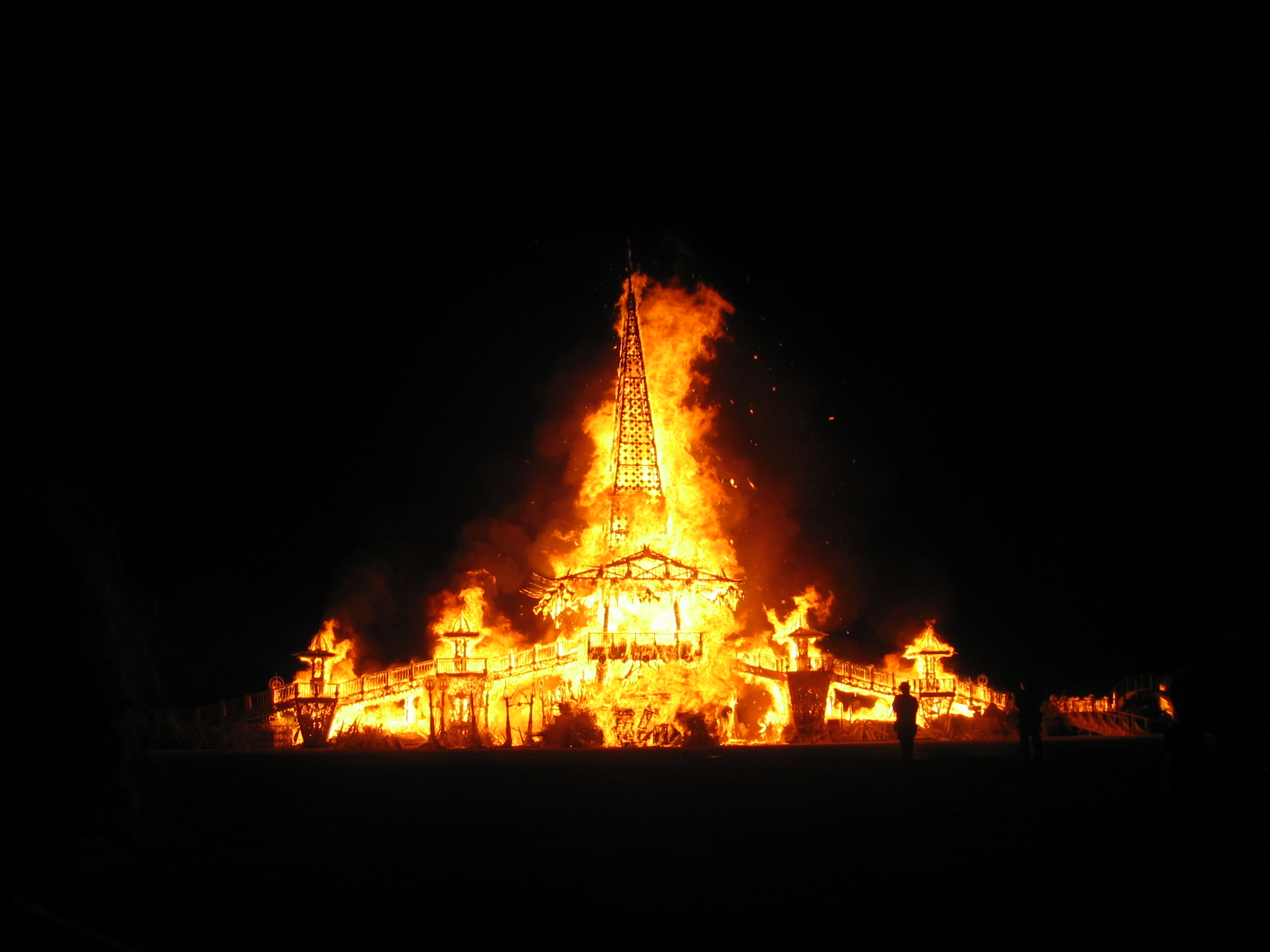
The travelling festival Burning Man was described by one scholar as the "very definition of ephemerality".

Ephemerality (from Ancient Greek ἐφήμερος (ephēmeros) 'lasting only a day') is the concept of things being transitory, existing only briefly. Academically, the term ephemeral constitutionally describes a diverse assortment of things and experiences, from digital media to types of ponds and streams. With respect to unique performances, for example, it has been noted that "[e]phemerality is a quality caused by the ebb and flow of the crowd's concentration on the performance and a reflection of the nostalgic character of specific performances". Because different people may value the passage of time differently, ephemerality may be a relative, perceptual concept: "In brief, what is short-lived may not be the object itself, but the attention we afford it".

== Ephemerality and nature ==
=== Geographical features ===
An ephemeral stream is that which only exists following precipitation. They are not the same as intermittent or seasonal waterbodies, which exist for longer periods, but not all year round. Ephemeral streams can be difficult to "conceptually defin[e]"; those that are discontinuous, due to altering between aggradation or degradation, have the appearance of continual change. Furthermore, the characteristics of terrain and rainfall are profound in affecting ephemeral streams. Ephemeral waterbodies experience formative change upon the end of a hydroperiod. "Due to lack of continuous hydrology data, the designation of sites as ephemeral or intermittent is necessarily tenuous". Ephemeral streams feature a low degree of hydrological connectivity.

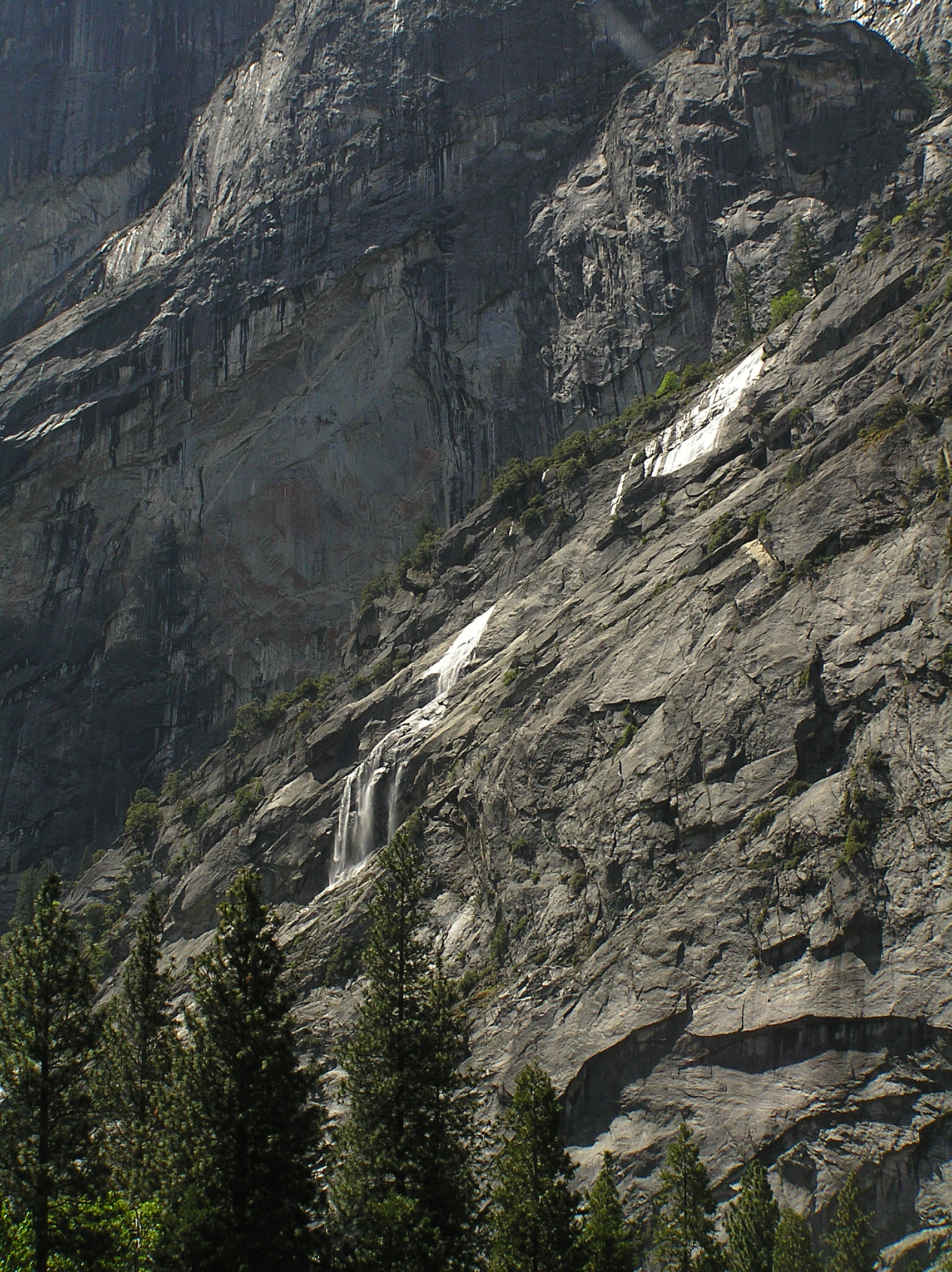
Staircase Falls in Yosemite National Park only flows after heavy rainfall or snowmelt

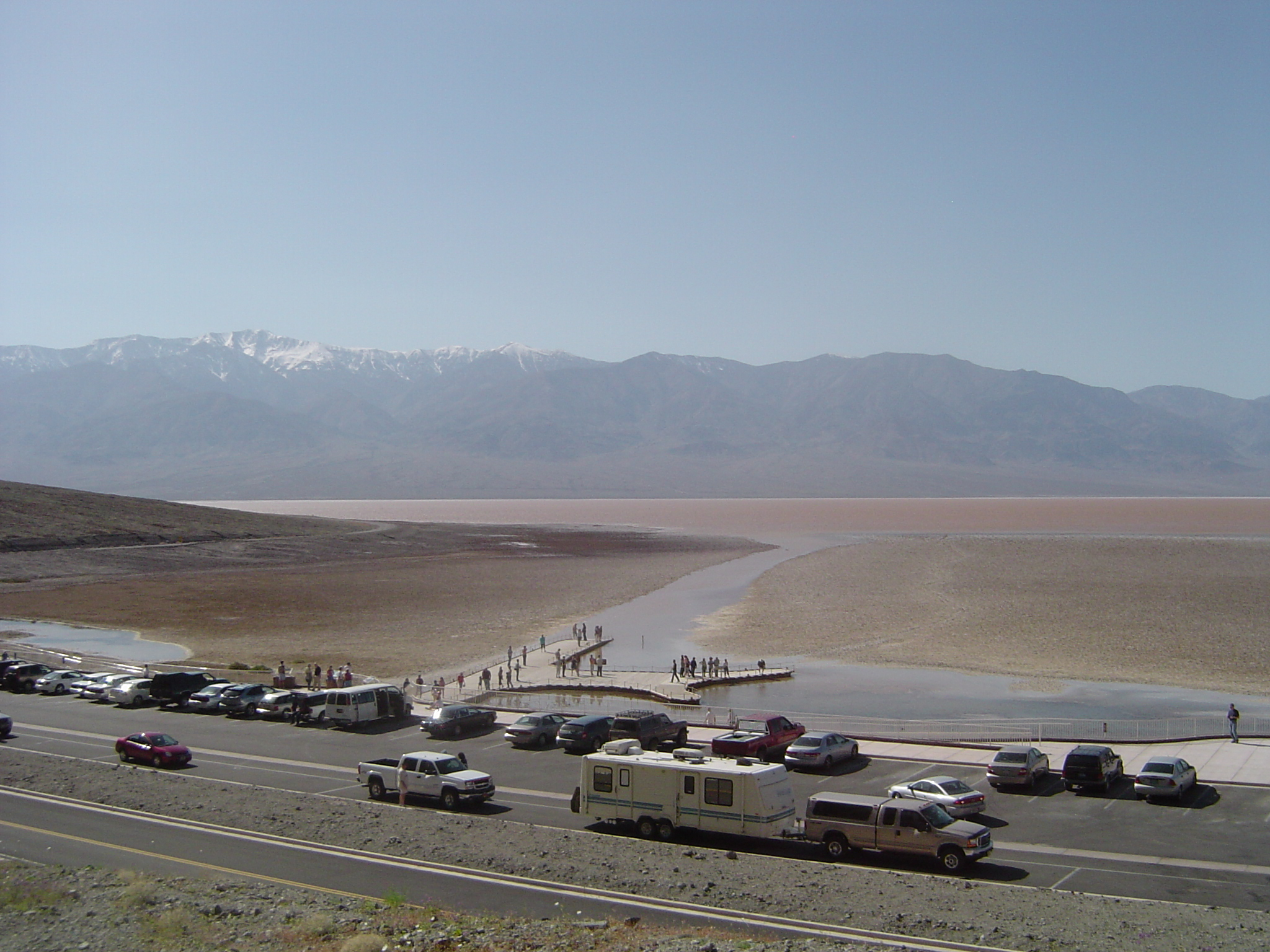
A lake formed at Badwater within Death Valley National Park during the unusually wet winter and spring of 2005

Small wetlands are often ephemeral and ephemeral ecosystems are often aquatic; ephemeral wetlands, streams and ponds are a varied and global occurrence. In northeastern United States, ephemeral freshwater systems are abundant and are "critical to the maintenance of forest biodiversity". Hydroperiod, predation, competition and food availability are among the "highly heterogeneous" elements of these features. In tropical biomes, amphibians often reside in ephemeral habitats during dry seasons; opportunistic species utilise similar and ephemeral habitats for food, sleep or mating. Environments akin to ephemeral ponds can be very significant sites of reproduction for amphibians; many other organism make use of ephemeral ponds, pools and streams to breed. Those which do utilise these sites are significantly constrained by time thus they mature, reproduce or disperse before evaporation. Ephemeral pools lasting only days or weeks are exclusively used for breeding by Fletcher's frog regardless of the precarious survival of offspring. Fletcher's frogs use these sites to exploit them, by-passing predation and competition. Tadpoles, however, are hindered by ephemeral streams, as can surrounding systems. Limited and unpredictable food availability means ephemeral waterbodies may be rife with cannibalism. Specific adaptions to ephemeral pools are abundant. Human alterations to the habitats of ephemeral nectar that flying foxes consume has led to urban migration. Climate change significantly affects ephemeral freshwater systems and changes in climates may be precisely identified by the ecosystems of ephemeral pools.

Ephemeral habitat patches have repeatedly been assessed as detrimental to metapopulation persistence, although metapopulations are not always negatively affected by ephemeral landscapes. These patches occur as a result of the habitat's turnover. Ephemeral streams have, relative to their perennial counterparts, lower species richness; the streams are "potentially demanding" for inhabitants, although some species do reside.

Ephemeral rivers sometimes form waterholes in geological depressions or areas scoured by erosion, and are common in arid regions of Australia.

The ephemerality of a river network is a particularly significant element in the hydrological transmission of waterborne diseases, via a direct and indirect presence in the transmission cycle – the nature of the disease and area covered are important factors as well. Diseases like malaria, dengue fever, chikungunya, zika and schistosomiasis are found in ephemeral waterbodies due to their vectors' relation toward and/or reliance on them.

Examples of ephemeral streams are the Luni river in Rajasthan, India, Ugab River in Southern Africa, and a number of small ephemeral watercourses that drain Talak in northern Niger. Other notable ephemeral rivers include the Todd River and Sandover River in Central Australia as well as the Son River, Batha River, and the Trabancos River.

Any endorheic basin, or closed basin, that contains a playa (dry lake) at its drainage lowpoint can become an ephemeral lake. Examples include Lake Carnegie in Western Australia, Lake Cowal in New South Wales, Mystic Lake and Rogers Lake in California, and Sevier Lake in Utah. Even the driest and lowest place in North America, Death Valley (more specifically Badwater Basin), became flooded with a short-lived ephemeral lake in the spring of 2005. Costelloe et al. (2009) describes salt lakes found in the arid zone of Australia as profoundly ephemeral.

There are also ephemeral islands such as Banua Wuhu and Home Reef. These islands appear when volcanic activity increases their height above sea level, but disappear over several years due to wave erosion. Bassas da India, on the other hand, is a near-sea level island that appears only at low tide. On account of changing demarcation, shores exist as ephemeral.

Only a small amount of southern Costa Rica's secondary forests reach maturity, indicating that they may be "generally ephemeral". Deciduous forests, via the seasonal change of leaves, are subject to natural ephemeral changes. Ephemeral pools located in forests are commonly known as "vernal pools", often lasting in a seasonal manner. Landscapes feature ephemeral changes of both natural and man-made origin. Furrows, haystacks and sheaves are ephemeral aspects of a landscape.

=== Biological processes ===
Plants whose life cycle is significantly less than the time of a growing season are deemed ephemeral. Winter annuals, Epilobium and Senecio vulgaris are examples of ephemeral plants. The conditions for ephemeral plants are markedly present in deserts.

Animals can be ephemeral, with brine shrimp and the mayfly being examples. The placenta is considered an ephemeral organ present during gestation and pregnancy.

Ephemerality is a component of olfaction, breathing, speech and memory, aligned with permanency in the latter. With regards to witnessing an artwork in a museum, limited research indicates that the ephemerality of solely gazing at the artwork results in greater remembrance compared to the resulting memory from taking a photograph. Psychologists have studied why ephemerality may improve memory retention; social psychologist Karl E. Scheibe, conversely, suggested that ephemeral images are only memorable if repeated. The ephemerality of memory leads objects to assume the function of begetting remembrance on account of their greater stability.

== Ephemerality and society ==
=== Ephemeral objects ===
Objects which are ephemeral, per one perspective, are those whose compositional material experience chemical or physical changes and are thus permanently altered; this process occurs in a matter of decades. Furthermore, ephemerality can be perceived as defiance of value or durability; common uses of the term indicate a "complicated relationship between temporality and value". Ephemerality is a matter of varying scale and can affect the entire spectrum of literature, from a "finely bound" Bible to a "hastily printed" handbill: "Paper is the medium of permanence and ephemerality at once". Due to them often outlasting their expressed purpose, these objects can be perceived as temporal and ontological oddities; ephemerality has been described as constitutionally liminal. Ephemerality has been seen as indicative of epochs like the Printing Revolution, a greater expansion thereof, the Baroque era, the Victorian era, the Georgian era, modernity, or the "emergent post-print age". The likes of food, clothes, novels, zines, illnesses, breath, regimes, persons, glass, ash and ephemera have been said to illustrate and/or be affected by ephemerality. The new media of the 20th century conditioned perceptions of ephemerality in the 21st century—the advent of the telegraph, camera, and film projector instilled an understanding of ephemeral media. Scholars such as Charles Baudelaire, Georg Simmel, and Walter Benjamin saw the distinctly and intentionally ephemeral practice of fashion as emblematic of modernity. Scholars have described ephemerality as affixed to the present, a present that is ephemeral insofar as it is contingent.

Baudelaire, who considered aesthetics to be centered around an interplay of the perennial and the ephemeral, defined the artistic component of modernity by its ephemeral quality. Sarah Kofman posited that art is utilised to abate the "intolerable nature of all ephemeral things". Ephemerality has been relevant to a considerable amount of art; various artists have drawn upon the matter to explore time, memory, politics, emotions, spirituality and death. The Dada, Fluxus, Surreal, and Futurist movements all incorporated ephemerality as have Kuba, Mono-ha, and ukiyo-e. Perceptions of ephemerality vary between cultures, from melancholy and mitigation to embrace. (Note: Literature scholar Peter Schwenger further stated that "the traditional lament of the ephemeral object" is one of sadness at witnessing beauty fade away. Professor of English Andrea Henderson wrote that said lament occurs as a result of "attaching oneself to ephemeral objects", which are "made lovely" due to their short-lived nature. John Keats defined melancholy as profound desire resulting from ephemeral objects.) Performance art has frequently been described as ephemeral in nature; with regards to historical performances, the traces: playbills, scrapbooks of newspaper clippings and material artifacts are themselves ephemeral.

Literature is ephemeral, including definitions and "all printed texts". Ephemeral was first used colloquially in reference to printed matters. By 1750, an "expansion of all kinds of ephemeral print" had occurred. Hazlitt contended that such ephemerality was the result of widespread aestheticism, thus the creations were subject to being abruptly disregarded due to the cascading "gaze of fashion". Wallace Stevens adjusted his poetic standards due to a "perception of ephemerality" that living in New York City instigated. Art Spiegelman asserted that the format of comics, even during degradation, defies ephemerality, although they have been deemed as such. Women's writing, the likes of diaries and political pamphlets, have amassed a status as long being ephemeral, acknowledged by some affected in the then-present. The ubiquity of digital media has spurred the opinion that print material is comparatively less ephemeral. Elisa New and Anna Akhmatova varyingly opined that poetry is a means of repealing mortal ephemerality, with Akhamatova invoking the aphorism ars longa, vita brevis ("skillfulness takes time and life is short").

Ephemeral objects chiefly disappear; when preserved it is often knowingly, having been "rescued from ephemerality", though this practice is still fraught with uncertainty and an object's ephemerality may only be suspended, thus still capable of being transitory. The legacy of ephemerality often manifests as "traces, glimmers, residues, and specks of things". Literature may contest, document or approximate ephemerality although the immaterial nature means that there can only be an approximation: "In other words, there must always be an ephemeral beyond the ephemeral". Film has been used to document and combat ephemeral aspects of human development. Digital media's encompassing archival process means that information of varying importance can either be affixed or ephemeral, the former seen as the more generally common outcome. Digital personas, on account of precariousness and whim, can be entirely ephemeral, without any record. Grey literature has prove particularly vulnerable to the internet's ephemerality.

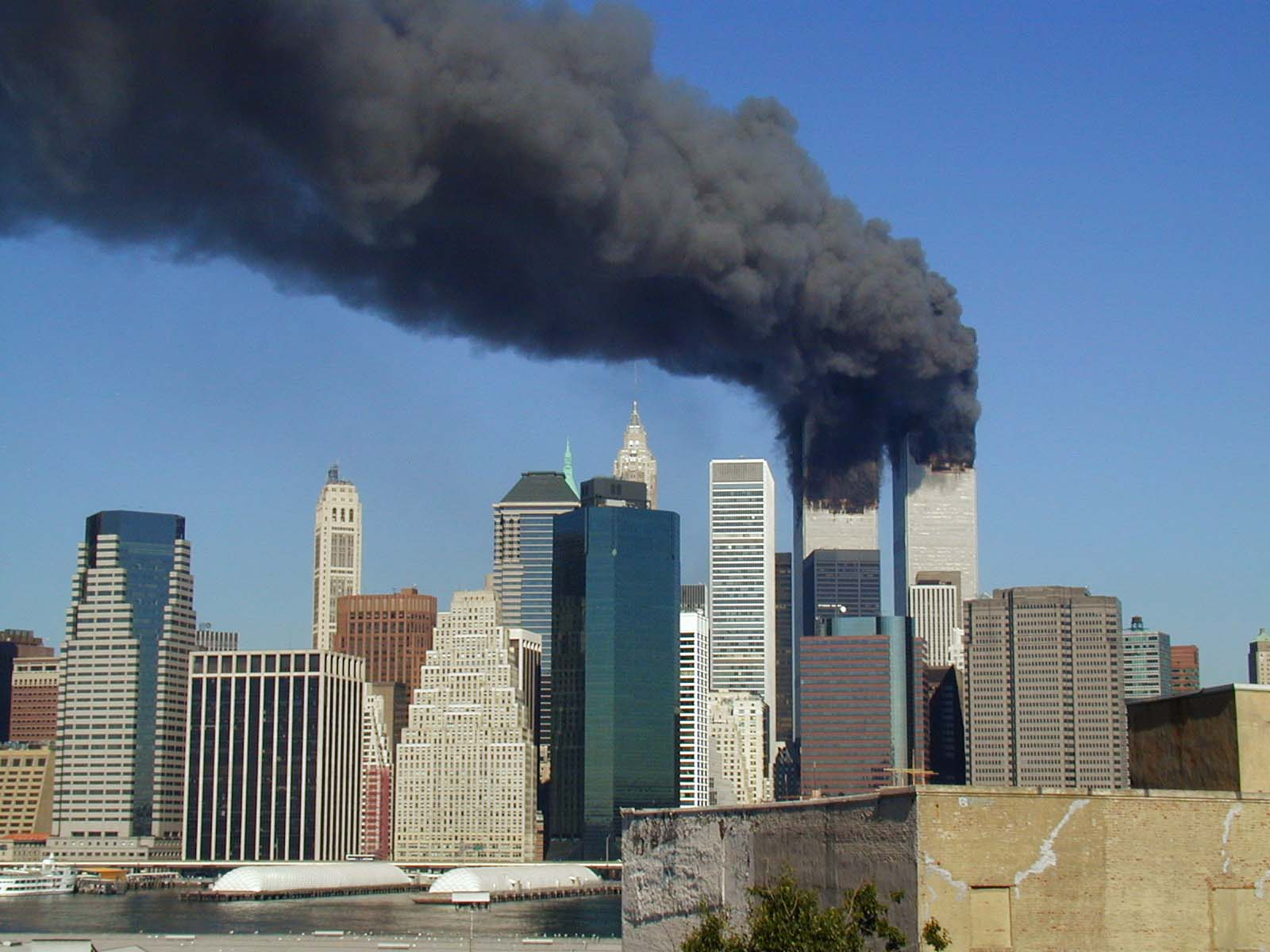
Art Spiegelman, in reference to the September 11 attacks, described the World Trade Center as “ephemeral as...old newspapers”.

Ephemeral acquired its common meaning of short-living in the mid-19th century and has connotations of passing time, fragility, change, disappearance, transformation, and the "philosophically ultimate vision of our own existence". (Note: Ephemeral in early archival theorisation often indicated little value.) Sarah Kofman questioned if "the beauty that conceals the evanescent nature of all things were itself ephemeral". Rather than melancholic, Sigmund Freud and Walter Pater viewed ephemerality as valuable; awareness and acceptance were to Freud commendable.

=== Ephemerality as a human condition ===
Multiple scholars have viewed ephemerality as intrinsic to the human condition, a phenomenon of physicality. A significant amount of living is ephemeral, considered by some as a component of everyday life: "we might best understand the ephemeral as a routine and constant force... that establishes the presence of the everyday". Ephemeral aspects are evident in communication, of both digitial and physical origin. In the digital realm, online interactions straddle permanency and ephemerality, new posts proliferate such that participants adopt a social norm that "the discourse will pass and be forgotten as the past". Ephemerality is a technologically and socially reliant concept – relative and historically changing. The rudimentary technology of early radio led to the media broadcast being ephemeral and for a substantial amount of time spoken communication was ephemeral. (Note: Lance Sieveking's oeuvre provides a common example of early radio's ephemerality and the resulting effect; his extensive work was eventually rendered lost.) Written communication, historically and presently, has been influenced by ephemerality. The emergence of new digital media and technology develops what we deem ephemeral, to the point that ephemerality is perhaps an "outdated concept".

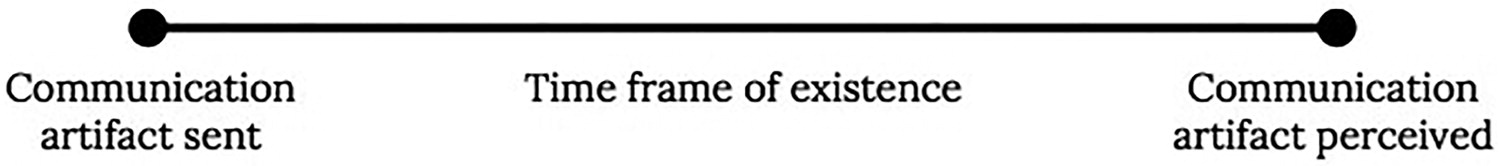
Visualisation of ephemerality in synchronous, in-person, communication between two or more parties.

Within the context of modern media dissemination, YouTube videos, viral emails and photos have been identified as ephemeral; as have means of advertising, both physical and digital and the internet collectively. (Note: YouTube videos, according to film scholar Paul Grainge, are ephemeral due to "the brevity of its clips".) Ephemeral media has been described as that which is brief in duration and/or circulation, adjacent to "the primary texts of contemporary entertainment culture". YouTube has "become a hugely successful aggregator of ephemeral media". In 2009, Ian Christie considered that a substantial amount of modern media, aligned with "rapid proliferati[on]", "may prove much more ephemeral than the flip-book".

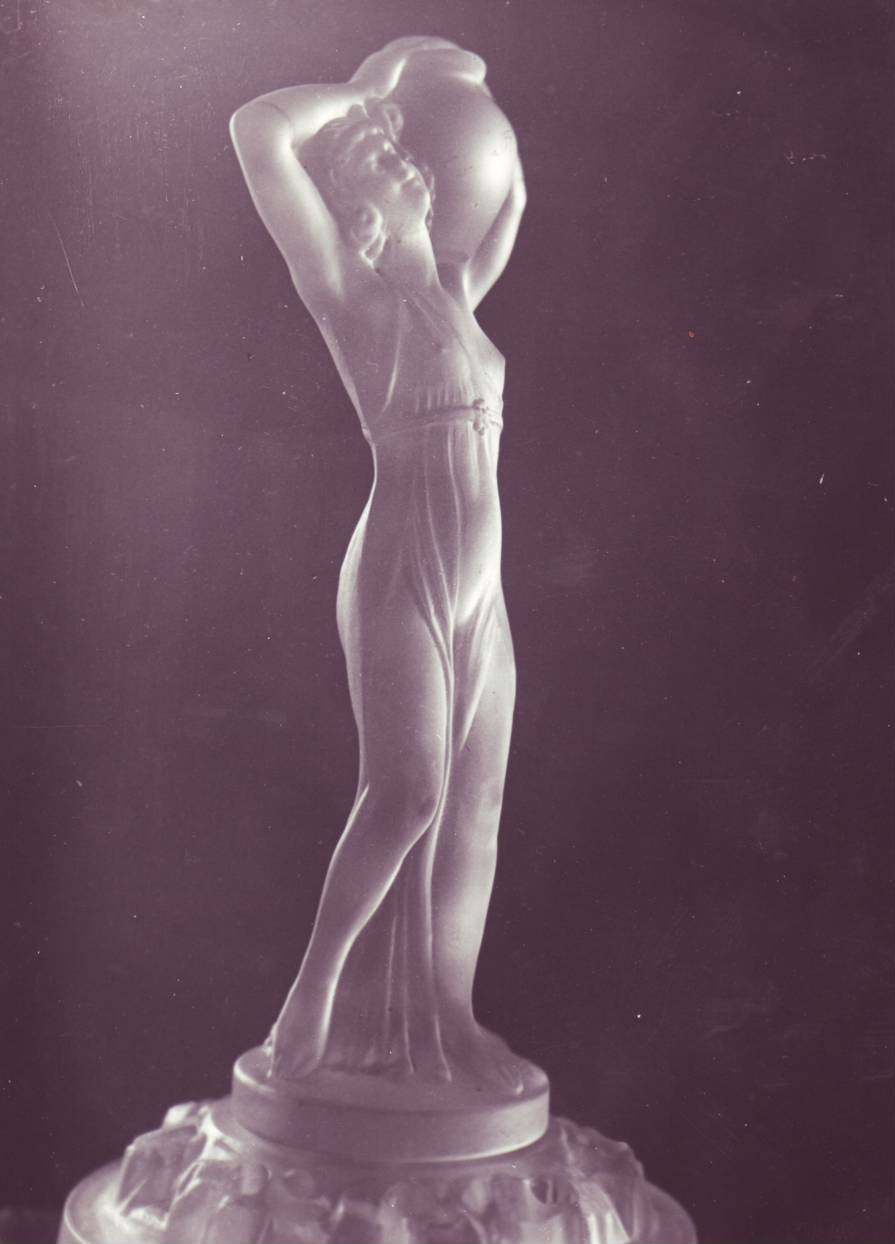
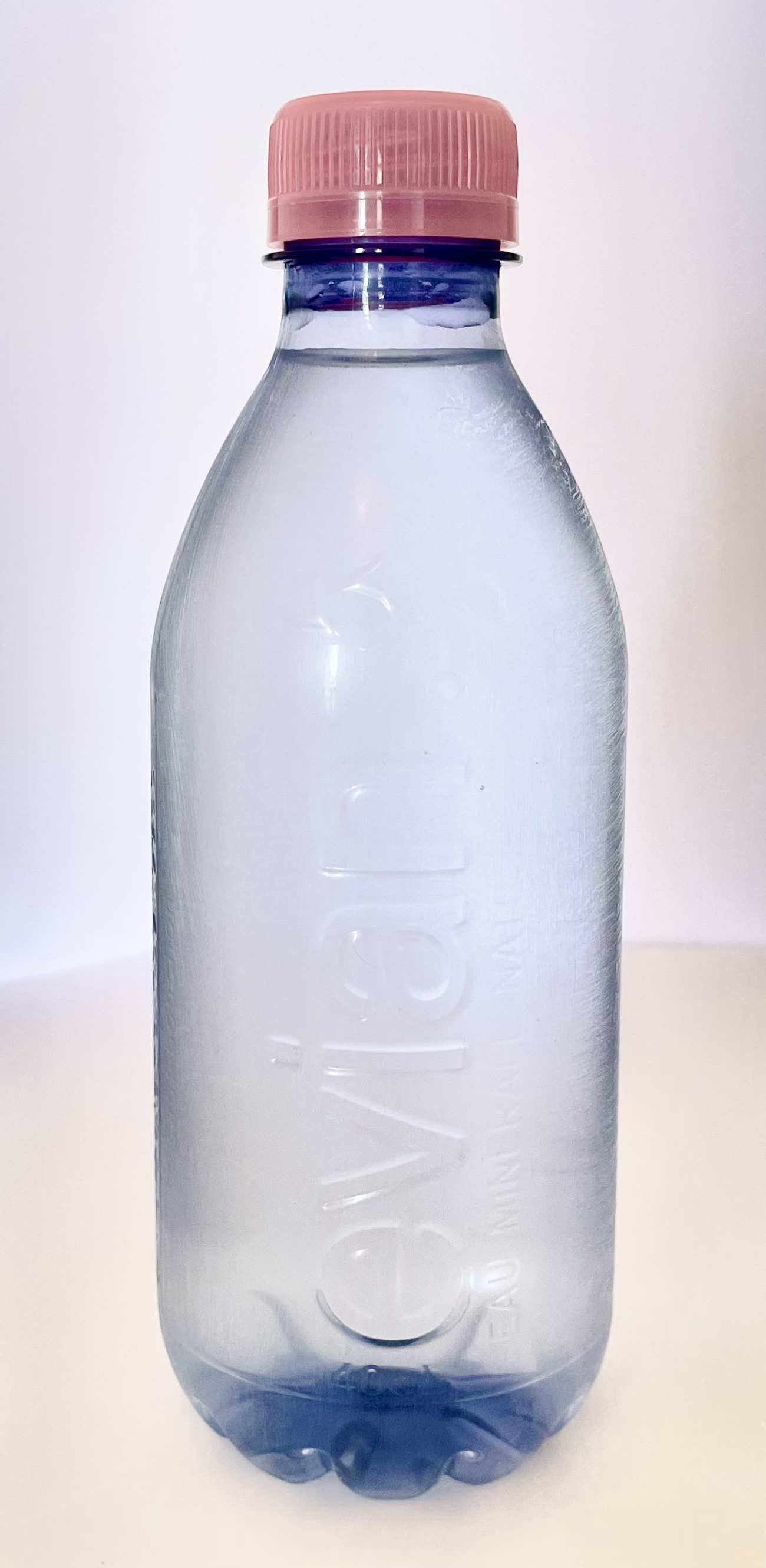
Due to its fragile and solid nature, Buci-Glucksmann used glass figurines as a metaphor for ephemerality. Plastic has similarly "become the archetypal expression of...ephemerality".

Wang Tao, Stevens and Rubem Fonseca evoked ephemerality via female characters; Virginia Woolf used the rainbow as a symbol whereas grass occupies a similar role in the Bible; F. Scott Fitzgerald and John Keats elicited melancholic ephemerality in showcases of consumption. Historically, the ephemerality of dreams was utilised in ample East Asian literature as a metaphor for immaterial reality whereas Baroque writings depicted the matter as analogous to life. Scholar of comparative literature Stuart Lasine noted that writers have frequently invoked ephemerality as a negative aspect of the human condition. Ephemerality was profound to Dōgen and was intertwined with sorrow and regret; he used "the imagery of ephemerality" in a waka concerning death.

Ephemerality has received increased attention from modern academics, in fields such as: literary studies, art history, book history, digital media studies, performance studies – "and the 'archival turn' in the humanities as a whole". The ephemerality of dance has engendered concern since at least the sixteenth century. Curators of modern and contemporary art have increasingly expressed a similar interest; curator of said genres Jan Schall described them as varyingly ephemeral. (Note: At least half of the San Diego Museum of Contemporary Art's collection was deemed by curator Elizabeth Armstrong to be "some degree ephemeral".) Ephemerality present in digital literature and poetry has seen critical analysis. Russell questioned if scholarly conceptions of "the everyday" was deeply intertwined with ephemerality, despite attention to a relation being thus far faint. Social historians and historians of sound have contended their subject's ephemerality by utilising more material forms; creative soundwork has long been subordinate to these forms on account of its ephemerality. The ephemerality of the internet and features that engender ephemerality, such as link rot, has elicited concern in regards to scholarly practice.

Like a blade of grass,
My frail body
Treading the path to Kyoto
Seeming to wander
Amid the cloudy mist on Kinobe Pass.

— Dōgen.

Ephemerality has been studied in the context of dancing. Witnessing a dance that will be rendered ephemeral is resultingly commodified and of greater desire to prospecting audiences; the same is true of fairs. (Note: Discussing ephemerality in relation to artworks, Purpura posited that it defies the commodification of art.) Muñoz posited that the physical proximation of dance, which coupled with the "shared rhythm", results in a unified yet ephemeral status of those engaged. La Sylphide sees ephemerality as a notable theme. Dance historian Mark Franko contended that the artform is approaching a state of being "post-ephemeral" while Diane Taylor viewed the lasting impact a performance may have as negating notions of ephemerality. The documentation of other ephemeral events: protests, installations, exhibitions, are often meager – public events, of varying size, naturally generate ephemeral material. (Note: Archivist Katrina Windon described the process of documenting the ephemeral as dialetical.)

"[Ephemerality] and disposability" have been perceived as components "of an American ethos"; alternative history novels such as The Man in the High Castle and The Plot Against America depict Americana and the nation itself as ephemeral. Ephemerality has been central to Buddhism; Yogācāra teaches a version of ontology that centers around universal ephemerality. Ephemerality has been identified as relevant to queer cultures; José Esteban Muñoz argued that queerness and ephemerality are intertwined, as the former has been expressed in methods which are prone to fade upon the "touch of those who would erase queer possibility". Freud considered culture as the prevailing element exempt from ephemerality. Scheibe saw the likes of live theater, travel abroad, stand-up comedy, and political pundits as engendering greater ephemerality by reducing attention spans and sense of personal history.

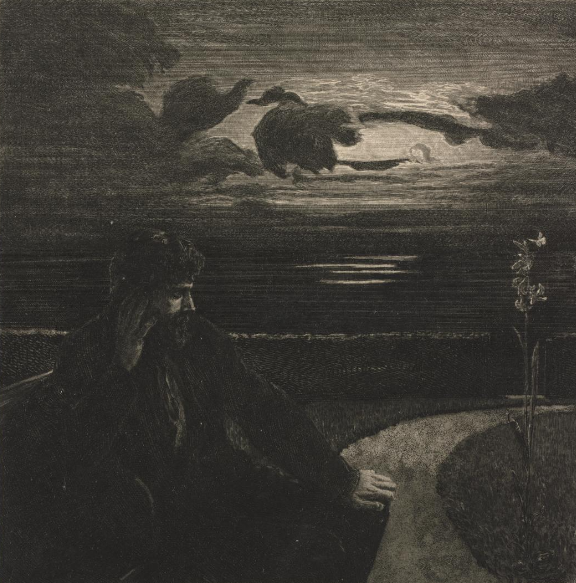
On Death, Part One, by Max Klinger which depicts life's ephemeral nature.

Karl Marx and Friedrich Engels' perception of ephemerality "represents a thoroughly modern experience". Ephemerality was furthermore prominent in the late 20th century, on account of multiple social features; Reiko Tomii described ephemerality as a "defining issue of the 1960s". In the 21st century, ephemerality "continues to signify concerns about the overflow of information, its evanescence, and questions of what or should be preserved". David Harvey defined postmodernism as "a total acceptance of ephemerality".

Architecture of an ephemeral nature appears as increasingly commonplace, on account of global and capricious hyper-mobility and mass displacement. Marc Augé observed ephemerality as key to the likes of airports, malls, supermarkets, office blocks, and hotels thus rendering them, per his definition, "non-places". Architecture scholar Anastasia Karandinou argued that the practice's modern relation to ephemerality correlated with digital media's evolution, which she says has enabled new conceptions of space and everyday thinking. Of an indefinite and contentious nature, the definition of a region is ephemeral.

== See also ==
- Liminal space
- Mayfly
- On Transience
- Vanitas
