= Dhaba (archaeological site) =

Archaeological site in Madhya Pradesh, India

- Location within Madhya Pradesh
- 24°29′57.6″N 82°00′35.0″E
- Type: Settlement
- Cultures: Middle Paleolithic culture
- Location: Dhaba, Madhya Pradesh, India

History
- Built: 80,000 BCE
- Event: not known

Site notes
- Excavation dates: 2011–12
- Condition: Ruined
- Owner: Public
- Public access: Yes

Dhaba is a Middle Paleolithic archaeological site on the banks of the Son River in the Indian state Madhya Pradesh. According to carbon 14 dating, construction of the settlement began around 80,000 years ago. In 1983, the prehistoric settlement at Dhaba village was jointly discovered by Researchers from University of Allahabad, Karnatak University, Banaras Hindu University, University of Oxford and University of Queensland. During the excavations microlithic artefacts were discovered.

== Archaeology ==
The archaeological site of Dhaba village consists of Pleistocene alluvial hillocks overlying unconsolidated quartzite boulders and decomposed shale bedrock on the left (north) bank of the Son River. Excavations were conducted at three sites in the archaeological site. Researchers from India, United Kingdom and Australia undertook a program of survey exploration and excavation. The Dhaba was first excavated in 2011–2012, where India's Middle Paleolithic culture was discovered. The archaeological site of Dhaba serves as an important bridge linking regions with similar archaeology to the east and west.

Archaeologists claim that the tools found at the site show that the "Levallois technique" — an early method of chipping stone into weapons – was used. The tools were buried in sediments dating 80,000 to 65,000 years ago. Tools in younger sedimentary layers were shaped with more advanced techniques. Specimens found in Dhaba prove that ancient Indians survived the Mount Toba super eruption, one of the worst disasters of mankind 74,000 years ago.
