= Deolond =

Town in Madhya Pradesh, India

- city
- Location in Madhya Pradesh, India
- Coordinates: 24.11°N 81.17°E
- Country: India
- State: Madhya Pradesh
- District: Shahdol
- Elevation: 320 m (1,050 ft)

Population (2001)
  - Total: 10,940

Languages
  - Official: Hindi
- Time zone: UTC+5:30 (IST)
- PIN: 484776
- Telephone code: 07650

Deolond also (Khand) is a town and Nagar Parishad in the Shahdol district of Madhya Pradesh in India, situated at a distance of 51 km (32 mi) from Rewa.

It is also the site of construction of the 67-metre (220 ft) high Bansagar Dam on the Son River. The village gets its name from Deol Rishi.

== Demographics ==
Khand (deolond) is a Nagar Panchayat city Khand town has population of 10,653 of which 5,672 are males while 4,981 are females as per census 2011.
