= Metis Shoal =

Island in Tonga

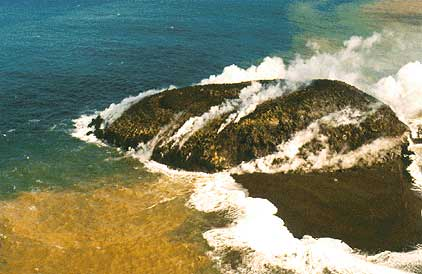
Lateiki in 1995

Metis Shoal, also known as Lateiki Island, is a volcanic island at the top of a submarine volcano in Tonga, located between the islands of Kao and Late. The current island formed in October 2019, when a smaller island disappeared after 24 years.

== History ==
The shoal was named by the captain of HMS Metis in 1875, who found a small volcanic island protruding from the ocean. The island was reported as being 200m long and 37m high by HMS Sappho in 1878, and as 480m high in 1890, but had eroded away completely by 1898, leaving a shoal covered by 4m of water. Eruptions and short-lived islands have been reported as far back as 1781, according to the Global Volcanism Program. In December 1967 an eruption produced another short-lived island, which disappeared by the end of 1968. An eruption in 1979 discharged large amounts of pumice, and formed an island 16km in diameter. The new island was named "Lateiki" ("lies besides Late") and claimed by Tonga in a flag-raising ceremony, but soon eroded beneath the sea surface.

== 1995–2019 island ==
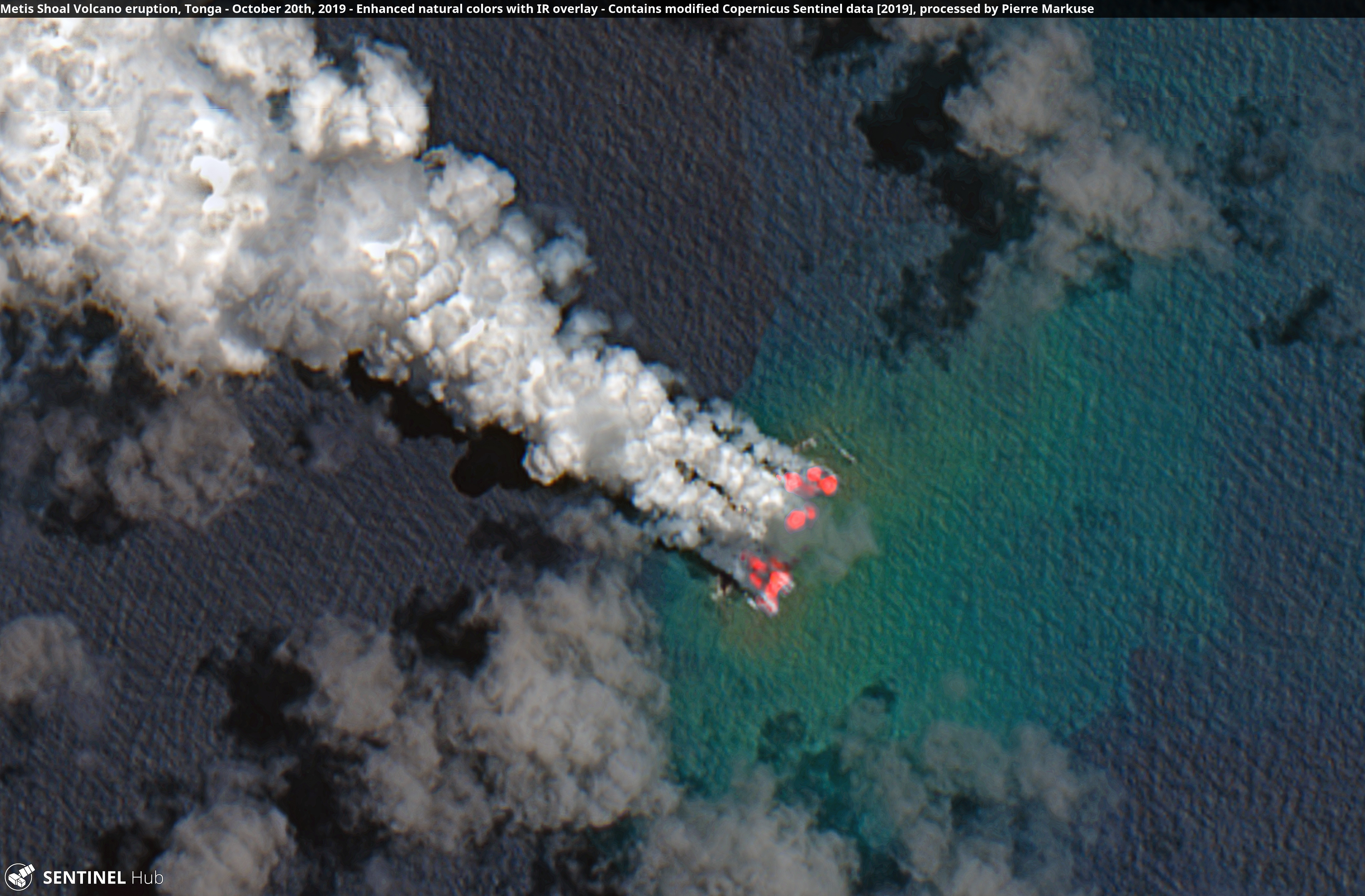
Metis Shoal Volcano eruption, Tonga, with added IR overlay - October 20th, 2019 (48936604791)

During an eruption in 1995, a new island (latitude: 19.18°S, longitude: 174.8°W) appeared which had a diameter of 280 metre and a height of 43 metre following the growth of a lava dome above the surface. On 7 December 2006 the Royal New Zealand Air Force (RNZAF) flew over Metis Shoal and Home Reef at the request of volcanologists from the Institute of Geological & Nuclear Sciences (IGNS) to take photos of Metis Shoal.

Another eruption commenced in October 2019. This eruption was first reported by Tongan vessel MV Ngutulei on the morning of 14 October 2019 and continued for more than two weeks. Photos were later taken by aircraft from Real Tonga and Air New Zealand, which showed that Metis Shoal had completely sunk.

== New island ==
The Tonga Geological Service announced on 6 November 2019 that the eruption in October produced a new and bigger island, about 120 metres west of the island which disappeared. The new island was estimated to be 100 metres wide and 400 metres long, which is three times bigger than the previous one.

== See also ==
- List of volcanoes in Tonga
- List of new islands
