= Kavachi =

Active submarine volcano in the Pacific Ocean

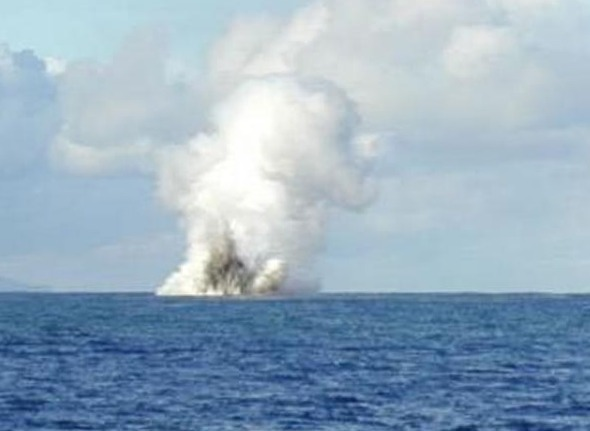
- Kavachi erupting on May 14, 2000
- Summit depth: 20 m (66 ft)

Location
- Location: Solomon Islands
- Coordinates: 08°59′37″S 157°58′21″E

Geology
- Type: Submarine volcano
- Last eruption: 2022

Kavachi is one of the most active submarine volcanoes in the south-west Pacific Ocean. Located south of Vangunu Island in the Solomon Islands, it is named after a sea god of the New Georgia Group islanders and is also referred to locally as Rejo te Kavachi ("Kavachi's oven"). The volcano has become emergent and then been eroded back into the sea at least eight times since its first recorded eruption in 1939.

== Geography ==
In May 2000, an international research team aboard the CSIRO research vessel FRANKLIN fixed the position of the volcano at 8° 59.65'S, 157° 58.23'E. At that time the vent of the volcano was below sea level, but frequent eruptions ejected molten lava up to 70 m (230 ft) above sea level, and sulfurous steam plumes up to 500 m (1,600 ft). The team mapped a roughly conical feature rising from 1,100 m (3,600 ft) water depth, with the volcano having a basal diameter of about 8 km (5.0 mi).

== Eruptions ==
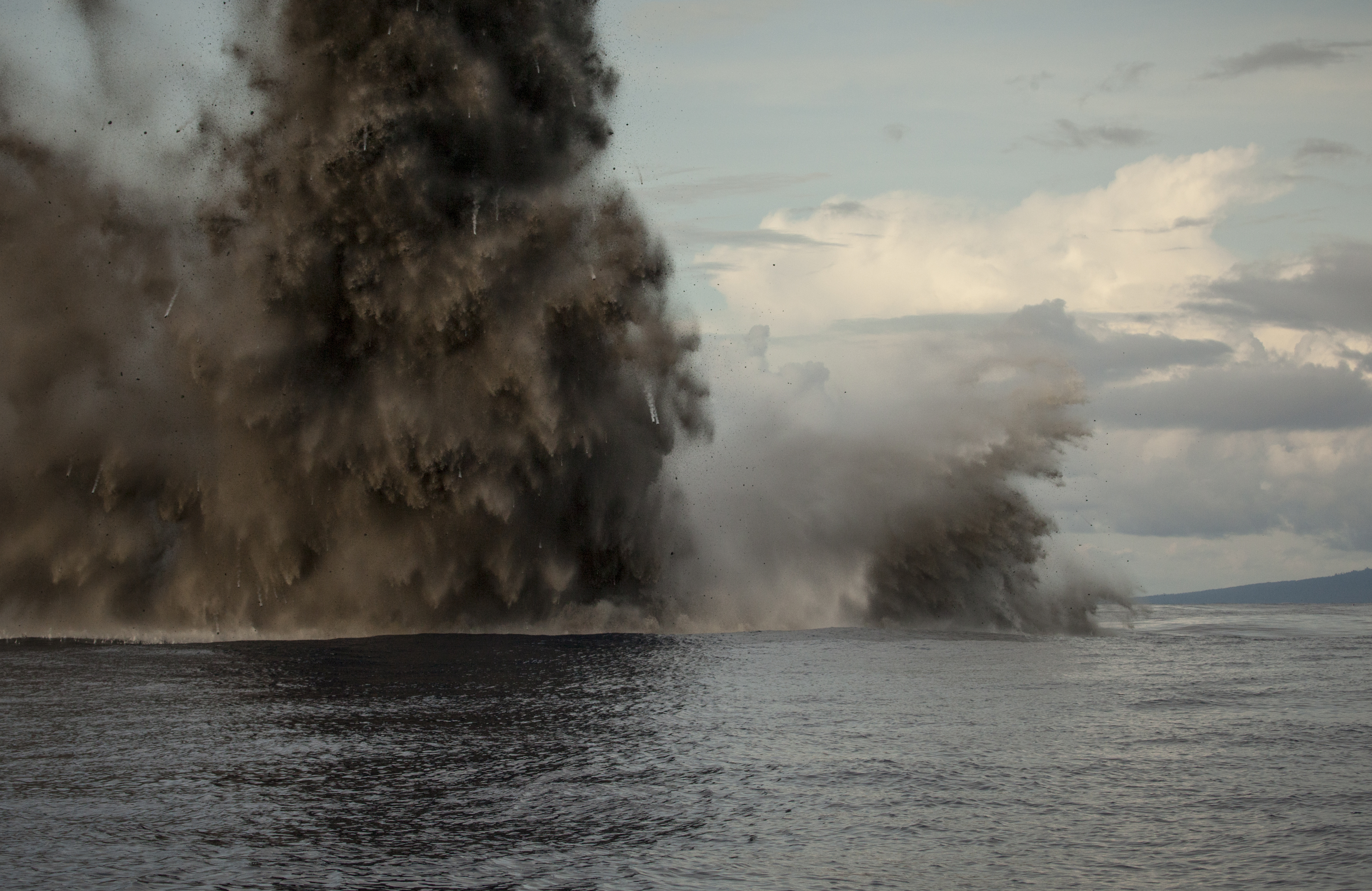
Kavachi erupting, 31 October 2016

When the volcano erupted in 2003, a 15-metre-high (49-foot) island formed above the surface, but it disappeared soon after. Additional eruptive activity was observed and reported in March 2004 and April 2007. More recent volcanic activity can be inferred from observations of discolored water around the volcano, in 2020 and January 2021.

== Marine life ==
In 2015, marine wildlife was found living inside Kavachi's crater, including the scalloped hammerhead, the silky shark, and the sixgill stingray.

It has subsequently been given the nickname "Sharkcano" by various media outlets.

== See also ==
- List of new islands
- Woodlark Basin
