= Bansagar Dam =

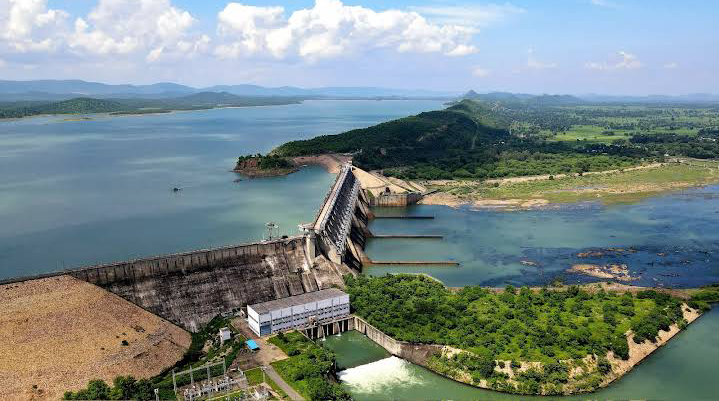
- View of Bansagar Dam from up stream
- Interactive map of Bansagar Dam
- Location: Deolond, Shahdol, Madhya Pradesh
- Coordinates: 24°11′30″N 81°17′15″E
- Construction began: 14 May 1978
- Opening date: 25 September 2006
- Operators: Water Resources Department, Madhya Pradesh

Dam and spillways
- Impounds: Sone River
- Height: 67 m (220 ft)
- Length: 1,020 m (3,350 ft)

Reservoir
- Creates: Bansagar Reservoir capacity = 5.43 cubic kms OR 191.78 tmc ft

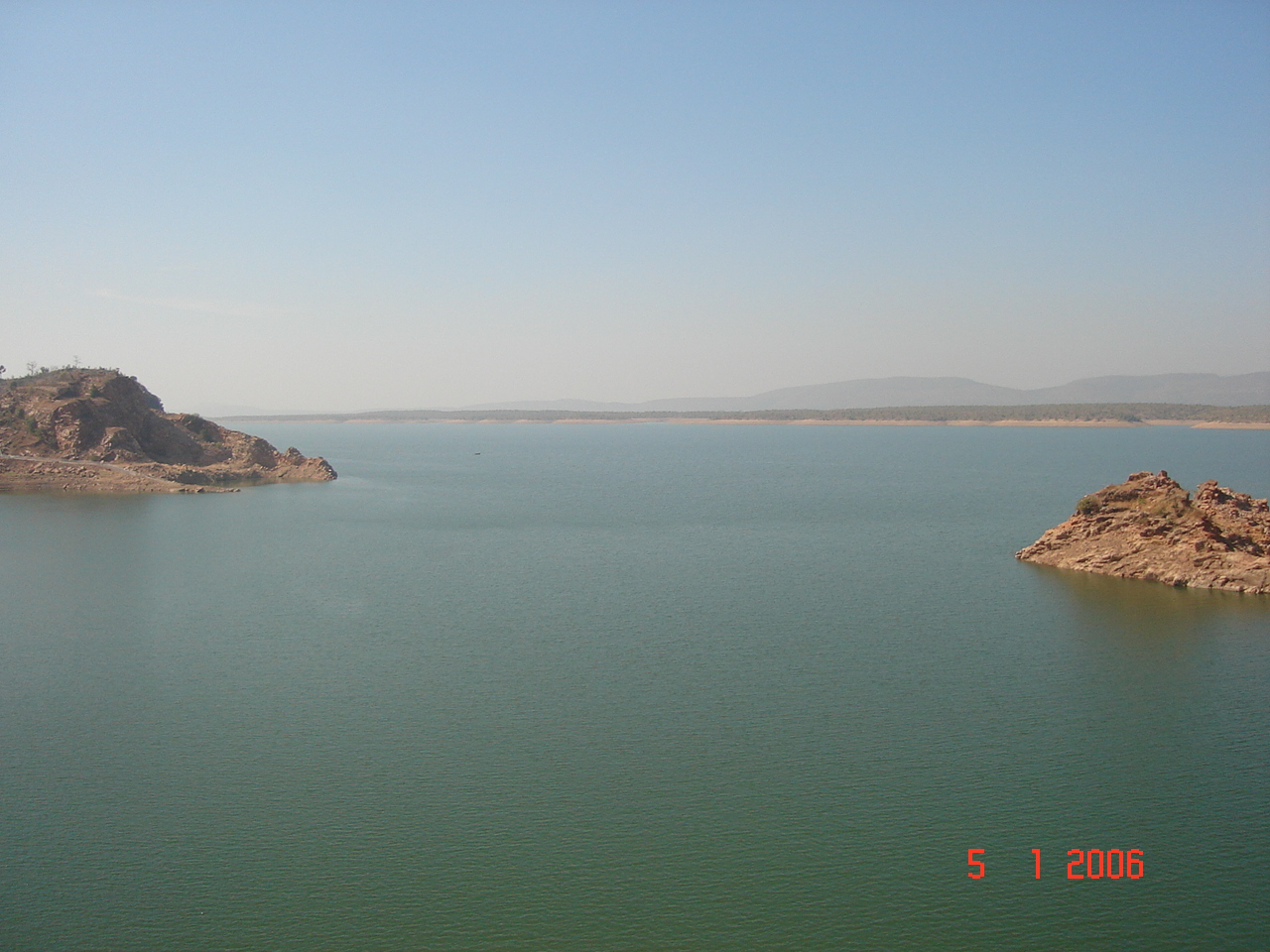
Bansagar Reservoir

Bansagar or Ban Sagar Dam is a multipurpose river Valley Project on Sone River situated in the Ganges Basin in Madhya Pradesh, India with both irrigation and 435 MW of hydroelectric power generation.

The Bansagar Dam across the Sone River was constructed near the Deolond village in the Shahdol district. It is surrounded by Maihar, Katni, and Rewa districts. The project was called "Bansagar" after Bana Bhatt, the renowned Sanskrit scholar of the 7th century, who is believed to have hailed from this region in India. Bansagar Dam is located at Latitude 24-11-30 N and Longitude 81-17-15 E.

The project was initially called the "Dimba Project" in 1956 by the Central Water Commission, New Delhi to be constructed on the Sone River at the confluence of the Sone and Banas Rivers near Shikarganj town 30 km down river from the present site. Later it was shifted to the present site at Deolond. There was an agreement in 1973 between the State Governments of Madhya Pradesh, Uttar Pradesh and Bihar for the construction of the dam, in which the states shared the expenditure in the ratio of 2:1:1. The 4 million-acre-feet of water is also shared by the states in the same ratio. The construction work was started in 1978 at original approved cost of Rs. 91.31 crores. The final estimated cost in 1998 was Rs. 1054.96 crores.

== Dedicated to nation ==
The foundation stone of the Bansagar project was laid by the late Prime Minister Morarji Desai on 14 May 1978. The project was inspected and allocated sufficient funds in every five-year plan by the endless attempts of Pandit Ram Kishore Shukla former finance minister of Madhya Pradesh. The Bansagar Dam was dedicated to the nation on 25 September 2006 by Atal Bihari Vajpayee, former Prime Minister of India.
