= Banua Wuhu =

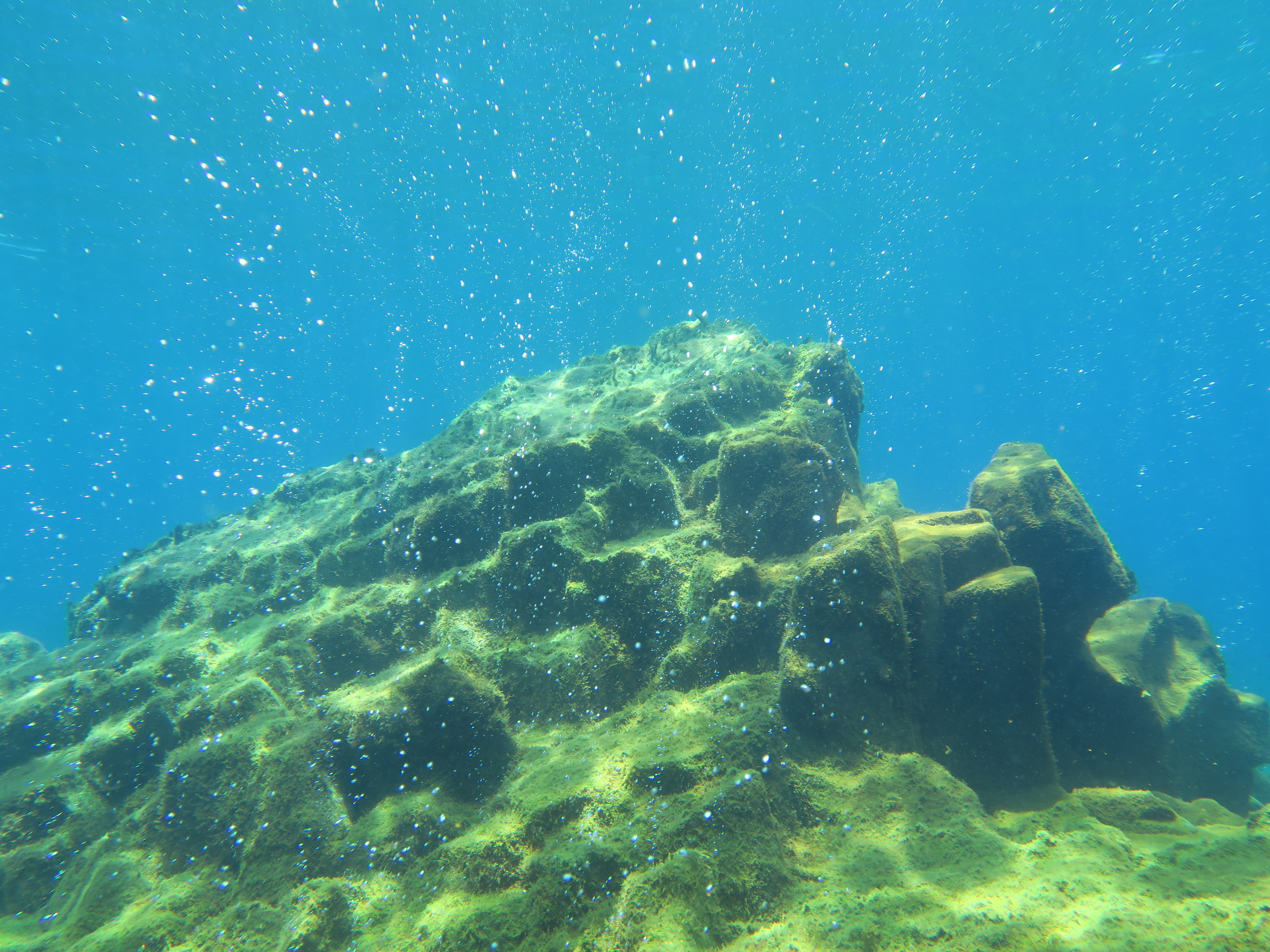
- Bubbles emerge from the surface of the underwater volcano Banua Wuhu

Highest point
- Elevation: −5 m (−16 ft)
- Coordinates: 3°08′16″N 125°29′26″E

Geography
- Location within Sulawesi Location within Indonesia
- Location: Location in Sulawesi and Indonesia

Geology
- Mountain type(s): Submarine volcano, lava dome
- Last eruption: July to December 1919

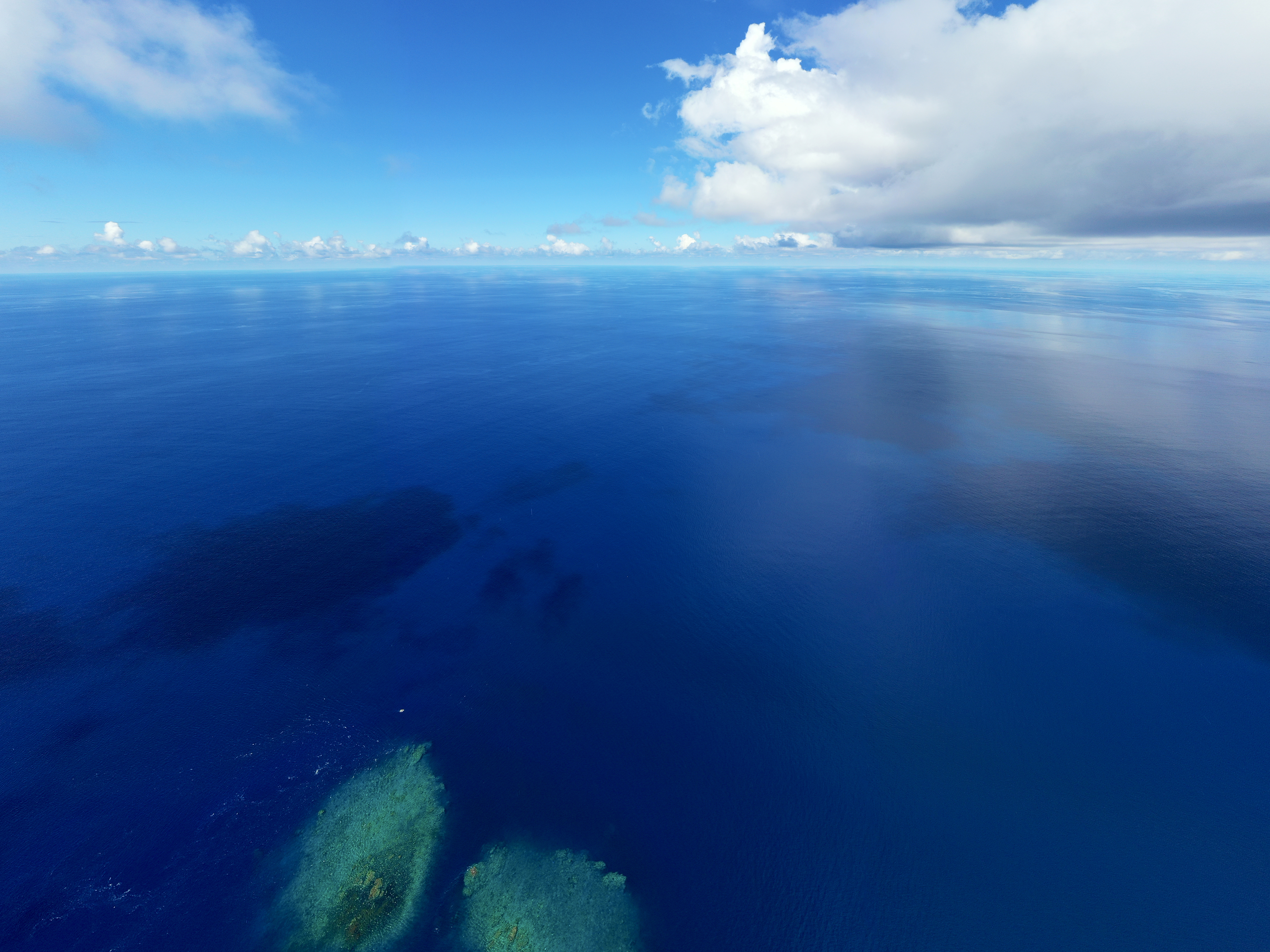

Banua Wuhu is a submarine volcano that rises more than 400 m (1,300 ft) from the sea floor in the Sangihe Islands of Indonesia. Historical records show that several ephemeral islands were formed and disappeared. A 90 m (300 ft) high island was formed in 1835, but then dwindled to only a few rocks in 1848. A new island was reportedly formed in 1889 and it was 50 m (160 ft) high in 1894. Another new island was formed in 1919 but then disappeared by 1935.

== See also ==
- List of volcanoes in Indonesia
