= On Transience =

1916 essay by Sigmund Freud

"On Transience" (German: Vergänglichkeit) is a philosophical essay by Sigmund Freud. It consists of a dialogue between Freud and Rainer Maria Rilke in which they discuss the meaning of transience. It was written in November 1915 and published the next year.

== Content ==
Freud frames the essay as a dialogue between him and Rainer Maria Rilke (referred to as "the poet" throughout). He reflects upon a most likely fictitious walk the pair went on, reportedly in the summer of 1913. Freud refers to a discussion they had (possibly in September of that year) on the matter of transience of which they had differing perceptions. Rilke found the transience of life disheartening whereas Freud viewed it as engendering value and beauty.

== Interpretations ==
Written during the midst of World War I, Jonathan Lear interpreted the essay as a response to the war's upheaval, describing it as "the problem that haunts it from the beginning", as well as mediation upon "a phenomenon that marks the human condition"; Lear did consider Freud's psyche more salient to the essay's conception than the mediation itself, writing that "This is not a thoughtful engagement between two serious people about the meaning of transience in human life: it is a polarized stand-off between caricatured figures in Freud’s imagination", a by-product of recent disillusionment. The psychoanalyst Matthew Von Unwerth described the essay as a "portrait in miniature of the world of [Freud]".

Frances Wilson observed that Rilke and Freud represent passion and reason respectively.
