= Shelly Island =

Transient North Carolina island, 2017–2018

Coordinates: 35°12′48.558″N 75°31′40.565″W

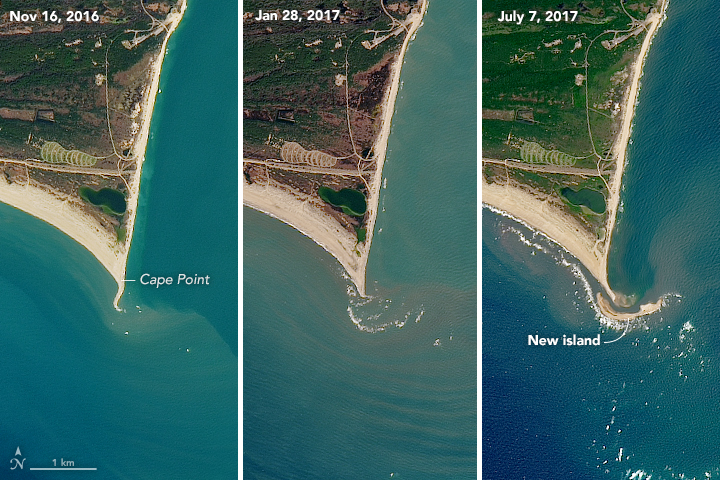
NASA Photos of Shelly Island, NC

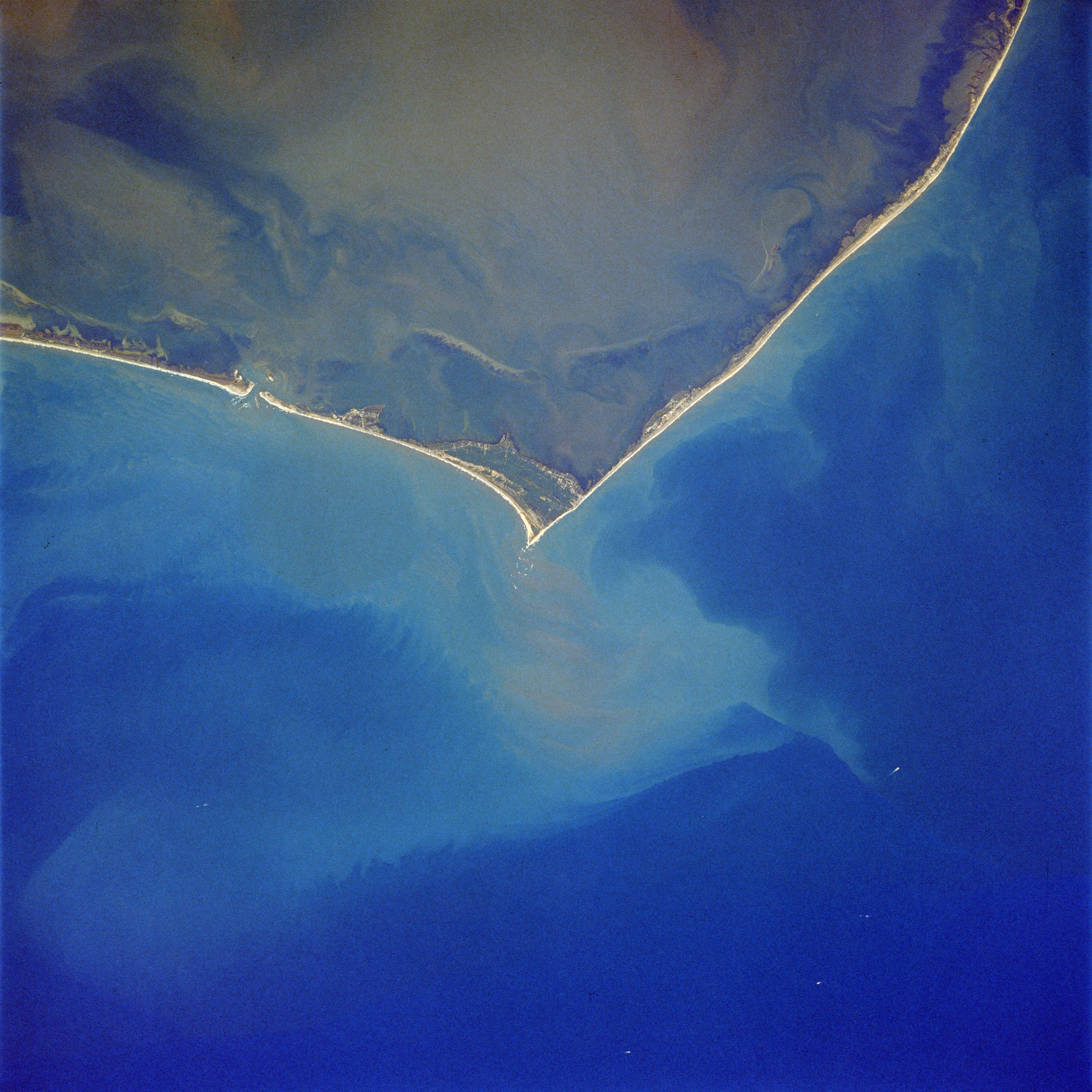
1989 photo of Cape Hatteras, with Cape Point at center, surrounded by sediment displaced by Hurricane Hugo. Shelly Island formed just off the tip of Cape Point in 2017, before disappearing in 2018

Shelly Island was a sandy island which began forming around April 2017, as a sandbank in the Outer Banks of North Carolina. Located off the tip of Cape Point in Buxton, North Carolina, the island was greatly reduced by the passage of Hurricane Maria in late September 2017. At its greatest extent, the crescent-shaped island measured around one mile long and more than 500 ft (150 m) wide. It was nicknamed Shelly Island by locals because of the vast quantities of shells that were found on the shore. By early 2018, the island had disappeared.

== Geography ==
The island sat a few hundred feet away from Hatteras Island, with water at depth of no more than 5 ft (1.5 m). The surrounding area is referred to as the Graveyard of the Atlantic. Small landmasses frequently appear and vanish in this area, but Shelly Island was notable for its size and the speed with which it formed. One explanation for the island's formation was a lack of strong nor'easter storms the previous winter, along with more than typical southwesterly winds, which led to the buildup of additional sand in the area.

As long as the island remained detached, it fell under the jurisdiction of Dare County, North Carolina. If it had grown enough to merge into Hatteras Island, it would potentially have come under federal jurisdiction and become part of Cape Hatteras National Seashore. In September 2017, businessman Ken Barlow filed a quitclaim deed against the island, seeking ownership of the land. At that time, experts cautioned that the island would likely not last a full year as a separate landform.

As of September 18, 2017, Shelly Island was connected to land at low tide, with water continuing to separate the island from the mainland at high tide. Over the next few weeks, the channel between the island and the mainland began to deepen again.

In late September 2017, after the passage of Hurricane Maria, North Carolina estimated that the island had been reduced by 70%, with the portion closest to the mainland reattaching, and a small oval of land remaining unattached offshore.

Photographs from Landsat 8 taken on February 16, 2018 revealed that the island had completely disappeared and that what remained of the island had merged with Cape Point, North Carolina.

== Ownership claim ==
Ken Barlow, a businessman and resident of Mechanicsville, Virginia, alleged that he was the rightful owner of the island by way of a quitclaim deed he executed in the Dare County Register of Deeds office on August 7, 2017. Barlow reasserted his claim in early 2018 despite the apparent disappearance of the island.
