= Horseshoe Island (New Jersey) =

New Jersey Island

Coordinates: 39.4730°N 74.3015°W

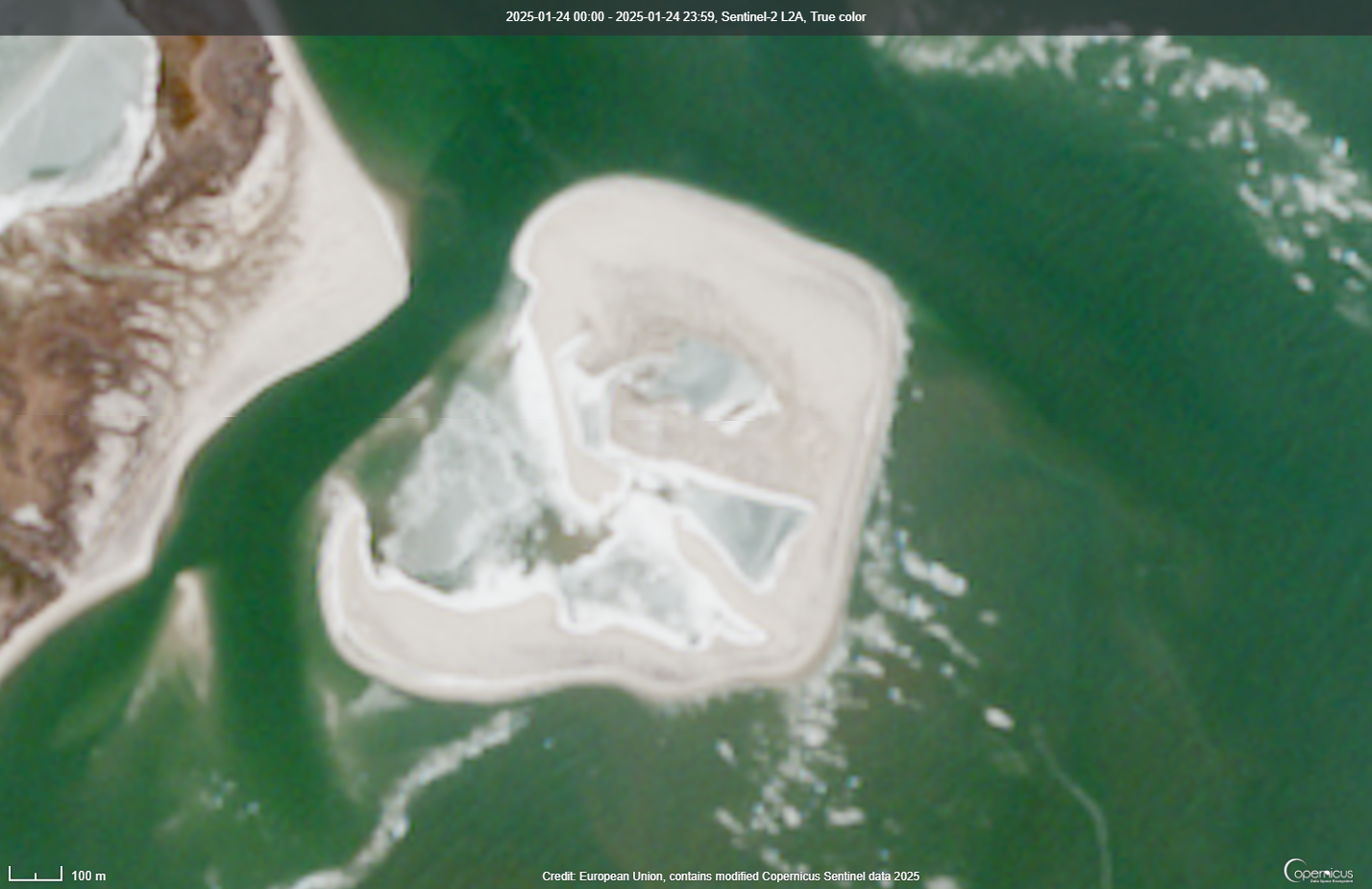
Sentinel-2 imagery

Horseshoe Island is a 100 acres (40 ha) remote island located off the coast of Little Egg Inlet in New Jersey. The island is critical for coastal avian species, as the area is both free of human and mammal predator activity.

== History ==
Horseshoe Island is a newly-formed island created by naturally-collected sand. The area has changed in appearance many times due to tide activity and weather. In 2018, a platform shoal emerged and has stayed intact. It is named Horseshoe Island due to its appearance.

In 2021, a group of biologists decided to take a boat out to Horseshoe Island and monitor bird activity. They discovered many nests filled with eggs and noted the importance of the area. Biologists aim to visit the island twice a week to count each bird and note which species is present.

Beginning in 2022, Horseshoe Island was closed to humans from March 1 to September 30 as to not disturb coastal birds during migration and breeding season. This seasonal closure will continue for the next five years. The area is managed by the New Jersey Tidelands Resource Council as it is part of the Edwin B. Forsythe National Wildlife Refuge. There is a likelihood that Horseshoe Island will continue to expand and merge with a nearby barrier island called Little Beach, located to its west.

== Impact ==
Horseshoe Island is home to many coastal avian species, many of which are endangered. Species nesting in this location includes black skimmers, least terns, royal terns, and American oystercatchers. Piping plovers and red knots do not nest here, but are reported forage at this location. Red knots, a federally threatened species, have continued to decline as they mainly feast on horseshoe crabs, which have become overharvested. However, the formation of the sandbar and shoal encouraged natural spawning, which has attracted red knots to the area.

Because Horseshoe Island is closed to humans and pets and is not home to any land mammals, it is a safe haven for coastal birds. In 2022, scientists reported around 2,000 nesting birds on Horseshoe Island.
