= Gopad River =

Location
- Country: India
- State: Chhattisgarh, Madhya Pradesh

Physical characteristics
- Mouth: Son River
  - location: India
  - coordinates: 24°33′15″N 82°22′31″E

Gopad River is a tributary of Son River. It emerges from the Sonhat Plateau and finally flows into Son river at Bardi (Singrauli district).
