= Deol =

- Jat clan
- Ethnicity: Punjabis
- Religion: Sikhism, Hinduism

Deol is a Jat surname native to the Punjab region of India.

== Notable peoples ==
- Abhay Deol, Indian actor
- Bobby Deol, Indian actor
- Dharmendra, Indian actor, producer and politician
- Esha Deol, Indian actress
- Jaz Deol, British actor
- Harita Kaur Deol, First Indian Air Force Woman pilot to fly solo
- Harleen Deol, Indian cricketer
- Monika Deol, Canadian TV personality
- Sonia Deol, British Radio and TV presenter
- Sunny Deol, Indian actor, director, producer and politician
