= Harita Kaur Deol =

Indian Air Force pilot

- Born: 10 November 1971
- Died: 24 December 1996 (aged 25) Bukkapuram, Prakasam, Andhra Pradesh, India
- Allegiance: India
- Branch: Indian Air Force

Flight Lt. Harita Kaur Deol (10 November 1971 – 24 December 1996) was a pilot with the Indian Air Force. She was the first woman pilot to fly solo in the Indian Air Force. The flight was on 2 September 1994 in an Avro HS-748, when she was 22 years old.

== Career ==
Hailing from Chandigarh in a Sikh family, in 1993, she became one of the first seven women cadets inducted into the Air Force as Short Service Commission (SSC) officers. This also marked a critical phase in training of women in India as transport pilots. After initial training at Air Force Academy, Dundigul near Hyderabad, she received further training at Air Lift Forces Training Establishment (ALFTE) at Yelahanka Air Force Station.

== Death ==
She died in an aircrash near Nellore on 24 December 1996, at age 24. She was one of 24 Air Force personnel to die when an Indian Air Force Avro aircraft crashed near the Bukkapuram village in Prakasam district of Andhra Pradesh.
