= Sone River =

Second-largest tributary of Ganga river in India

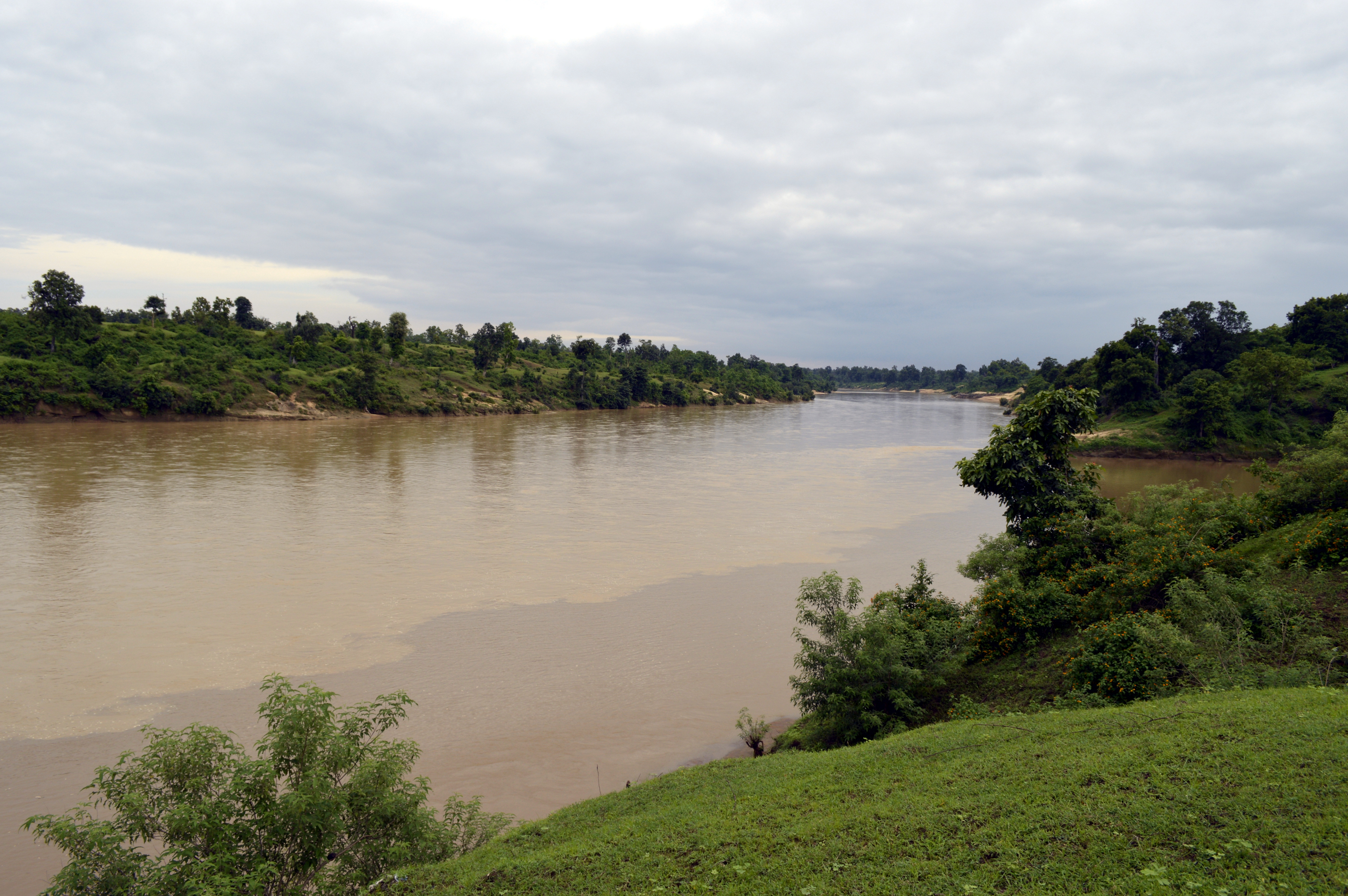

Location
- Country: India
- State: Chhattisgarh, Madhya Pradesh, Uttar Pradesh, Jharkhand, Bihar
- Region: Baghelkhand, Bhojpur-Purvanchal and Magadha
- Cities: Anuppur; Burhar; Ramnagar; Bansagar; Churhat; Chopan; Dehri; Arwal; Koilwar

Physical characteristics
- Source
  - location: SONMUDA, MADHYA PRADESH Nearest Amarkantak
  - coordinates: 22°43′48″N 82°03′31″E
- Mouth: Ganges River
  - location: Maner, Patna district, Bihar
  - coordinates: 25°42′21″N 84°51′44″E
- Length: 784 km (487 mi)
- Discharge
  - location: Ganges River

Basin features
- Tributaries
  - left: Ghaghar River, Johilla River, Chhoti Mahanadi, and Madhawal river
  - right: Banas River, Gopad River, Rihand River, Kanhar River, North Koel River

Sone River, also spelt Son River, is a perennial river located in central India. It originates near Amarkantak Hill in Pendra (Gaurela-Pendra-Marwahi district), Chhattisgarh and finally merges with the Ganges river near Maner in Patna, Bihar. The Sone River is the second-largest southern tributary of the Ganges after the Yamuna River. India's oldest river bridge Koilwar Bridge over the Sone River connects Arrah with Patna. Sone river is famous for its sand across country. Multiple dams and hydro-electric projects run on its course towards the Ganges.The river is also mentioned in Valmiki Ramayans's Balkand where Ram. Laxman along with Vishvamitra is crossing the river to further go north towards Ganga.

== Course ==
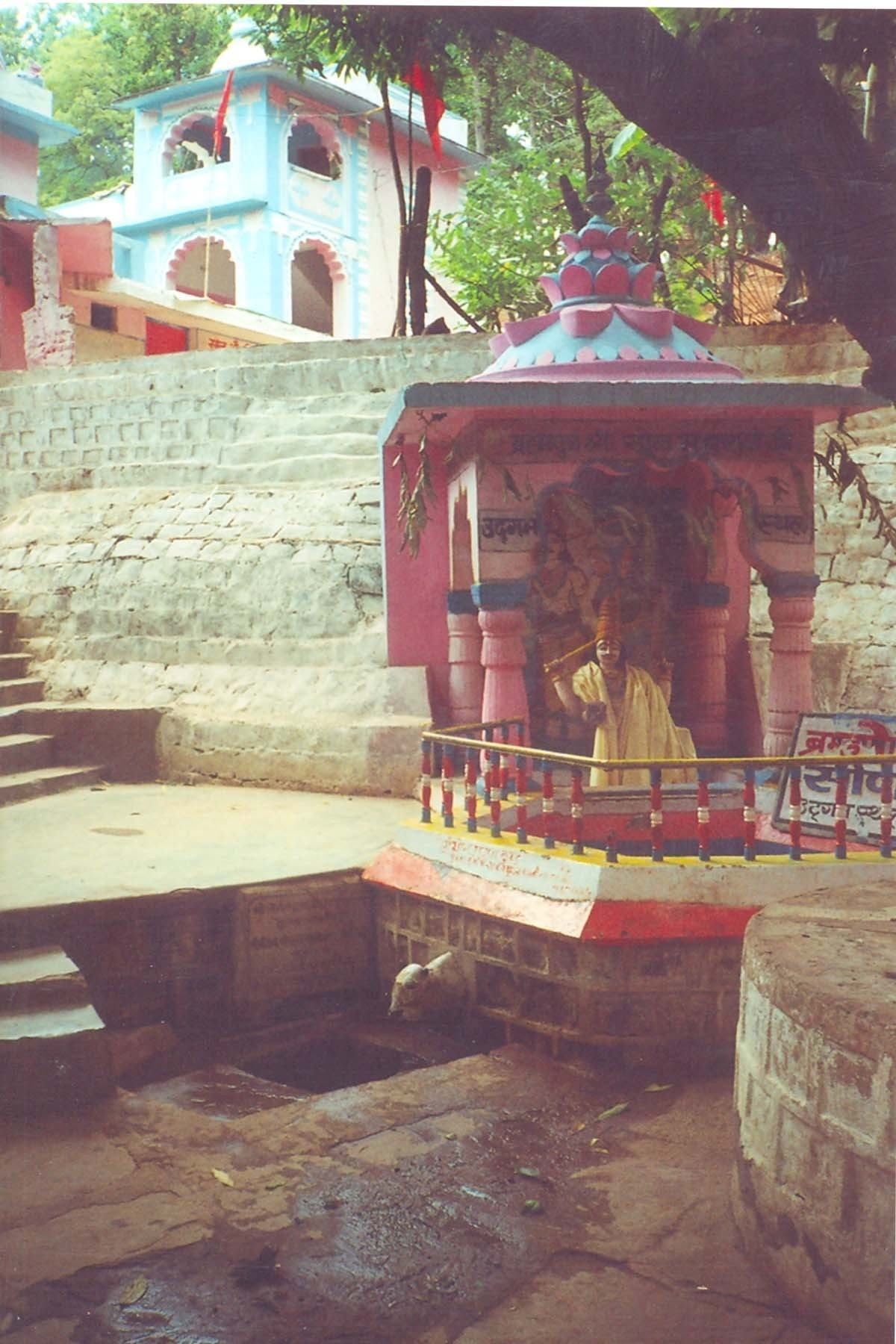
Sonemuda, origin of Sone River

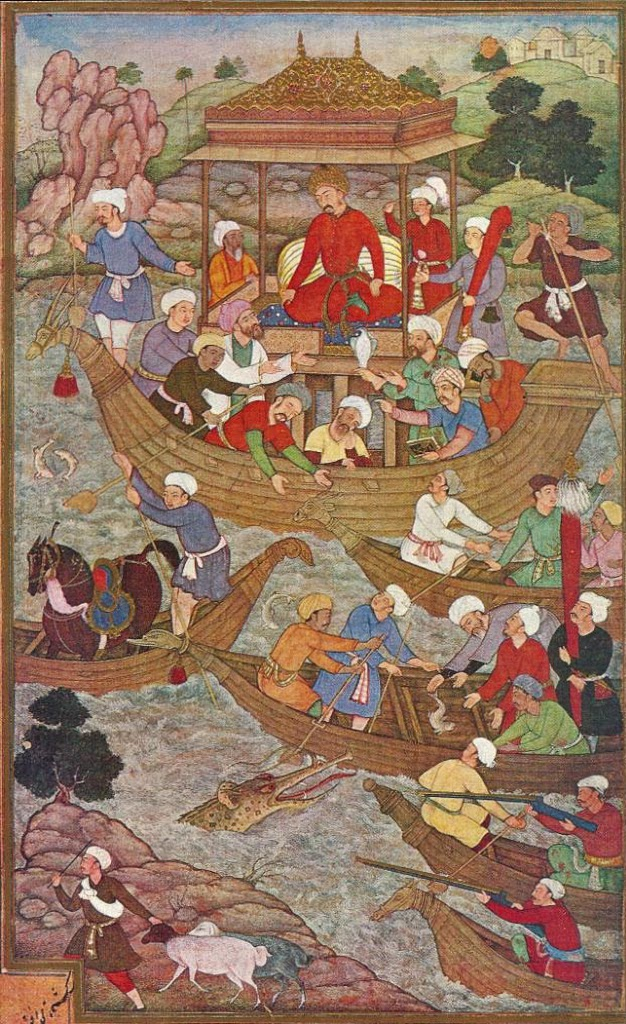
Babur crossing the Son River.

Sone River is called 'सोन / सोने' in Hindi, but called 'शोण' in Sanskrit, a rare instance of an Indian river having masculine name. Damodara and Brahmaputra also have masculine name. This river is mentioned as SoNai in Sangam Tamil literature Kuṟuntokai as early as 2nd century CE. The Sone originates near Pendra in Chhattisgarh, just east of the headwater of the Narmada River, and flows north-northwest through Shahdol district in Madhya Pradesh state before turning sharply eastward where it encounters the southwest-northeast-Kaimur Range. The Sone parallels the Kaimur hills, flowing east-northeast through Uttar Pradesh, Jharkhand and Bihar states to join the Ganges just west of Patna. Geologically, the lower valley of the Sone is an extension of the Narmada Valley, and the Kaimur Range an extension of the Vindhya Range. Arwal, Daudnagar, Deori, Rohtasgarh, Dehri, Sonbhadra and Maner are some of the major cities situated on Sone River.

The Sone river which is 784 kilometres (487 mi) long, is one of the longest Indian rivers. Its chief tributaries are the Rihand, Kanhar and the North Koel. The Sone has a steep gradient (35–55 cm per km) with quick run-off and ephemeral regimes, becoming a roaring river with the rain-waters in the catchment area but turning quickly into a fordable stream. The Sone, being wide and shallow, leaves disconnected pools of water in the remaining parts of the year. The channel of the Sone is very wide (about 5 km at Dehri) but the floodplain is narrow, only 3 to 5 kilometres (2 to 3 mi) wide. The meeting point with North Koel the width of Sone River is 5 to 8 kilometres (3 to 5 mi). In the past, the Sone has been notorious for changing course. As it is traceable from several old beds near its east bank, the river changed its course more than 5 times. In modern times this tendency has been checked with the anicut at Dehri, and now more so with the Indrapuri Barrage.

In Bihar, this river forms the border line between the Bhojpuri- and Magahi-speaking regions.

Sir John Houlton, the British administrator, described the Sone as follows, "After passing the steep escarpments of the Kaimur range, it flows straight across the plain to the Ganges. For much of this distance it is over two miles wide, and at one point, opposite Tilothu three miles wide. In the dry weather there is a vast expanse of sand, with a stream not more than a hundred yards wide, and the hot west winds pile up the sand on the east bank, making natural embankments. After heavy rain in the hills even this wide bed cannot carry the waters of the Sone and disastrous floods in Shahabad, Gaya, and Patna are not uncommon."

== Dams ==
The first dam on the Sone was built in 1873–74 at Dehri.

The Indrapuri Barrage was constructed, 8 kilometres (5 mi) upstream, and commissioned in 1968.

The Bansagar Dam in Madhya Pradesh was commissioned in 2008.

== Bridges ==
The 1.44 Km long rail-cum-road lattice-girder concrete and steel Abdul Bari Bridge or Koilwar Bridge near Arrah in Bihar was completed in November 1862. It remained the longest bridge in India, until the Nehru Setu bridge at Dehri was opened in 1900. After Nehru Setu bridge at Dehri, Railway Bridges are present on Sone River near Chopan, Vijay Sota & Anuppur.

The modern Sone bridge built in Deolond, Shahdol district of Madhya Pradesh was inaugurated by Motilal Vora and Pandit Ram Kishore Shukla then Chief Minister and Finance Minister of Madhya Pradesh on 13 February 1986.

The Government of Bihar sanctioned in 2008 a bridge across the Sone River connecting Arwal and Sahar in Bhojpur district.

New Koilwar Bridge: A 6-lane road bridge, carrying NH-922, parallel to the existing rail and road Koilwar Bridge.

== Gallery ==
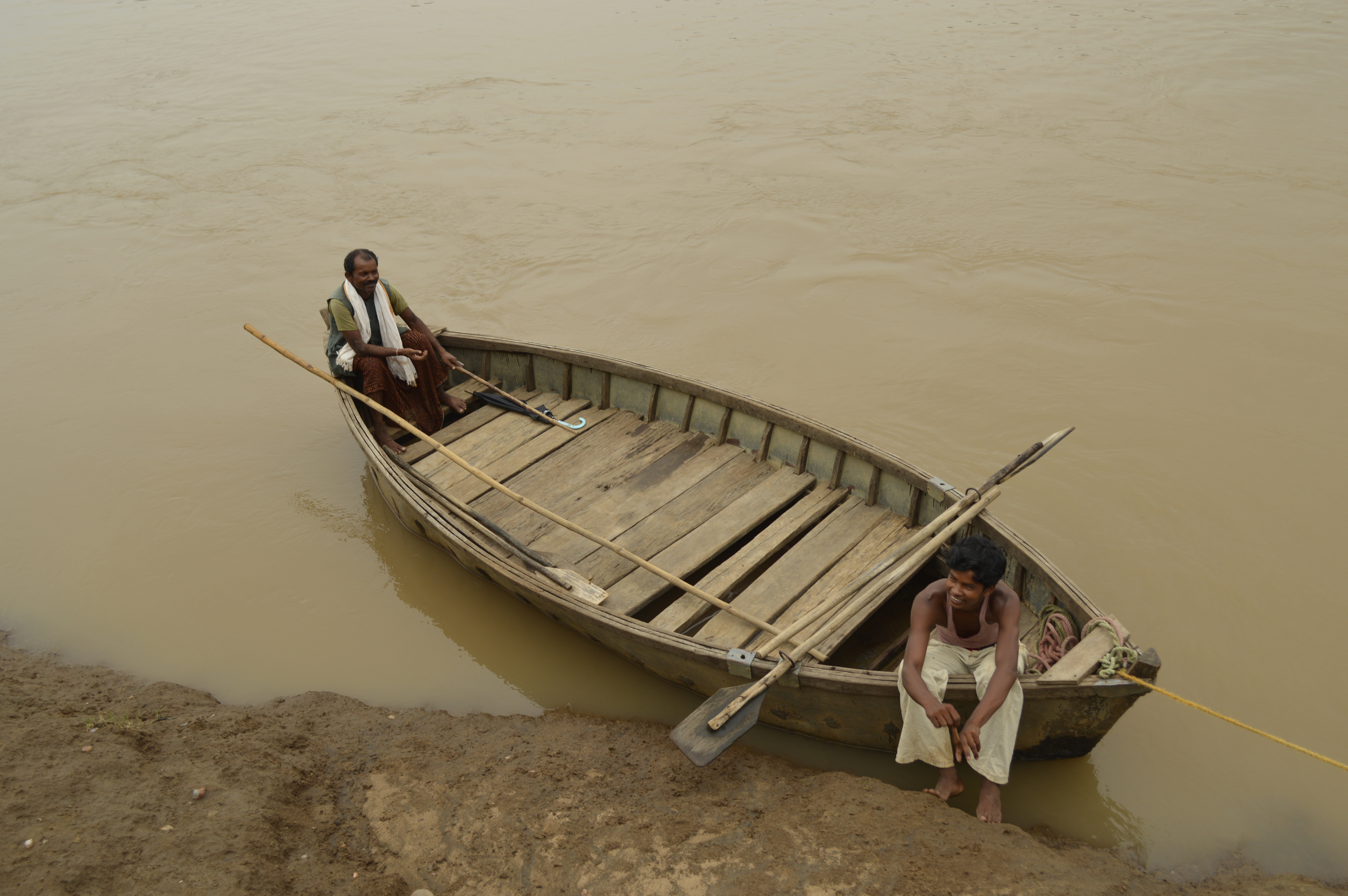
Boatmen on the Sone River, Umaria district, MP

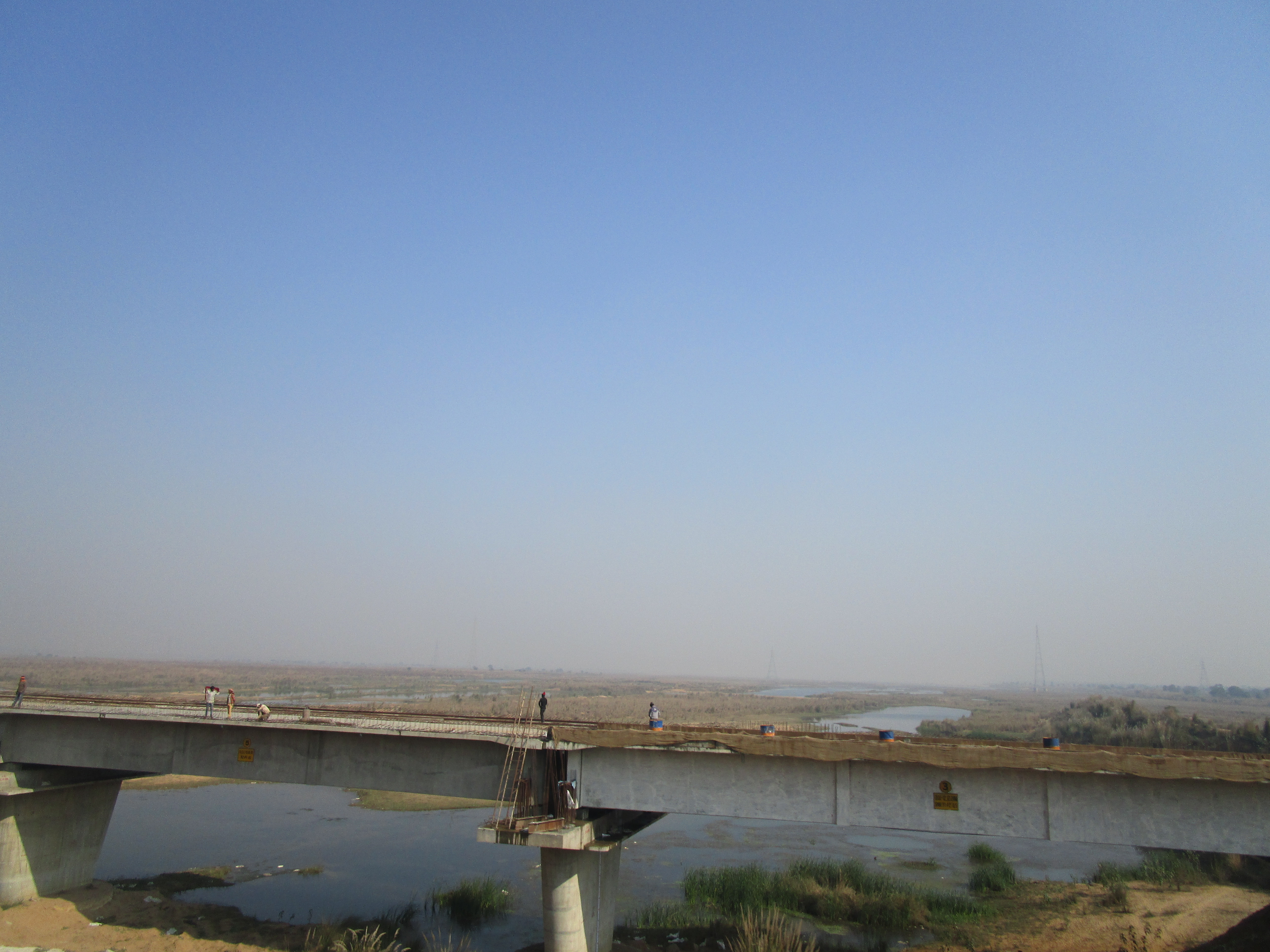
Sone River, from Son Nagar railway station, Aurangabad district, Bihar

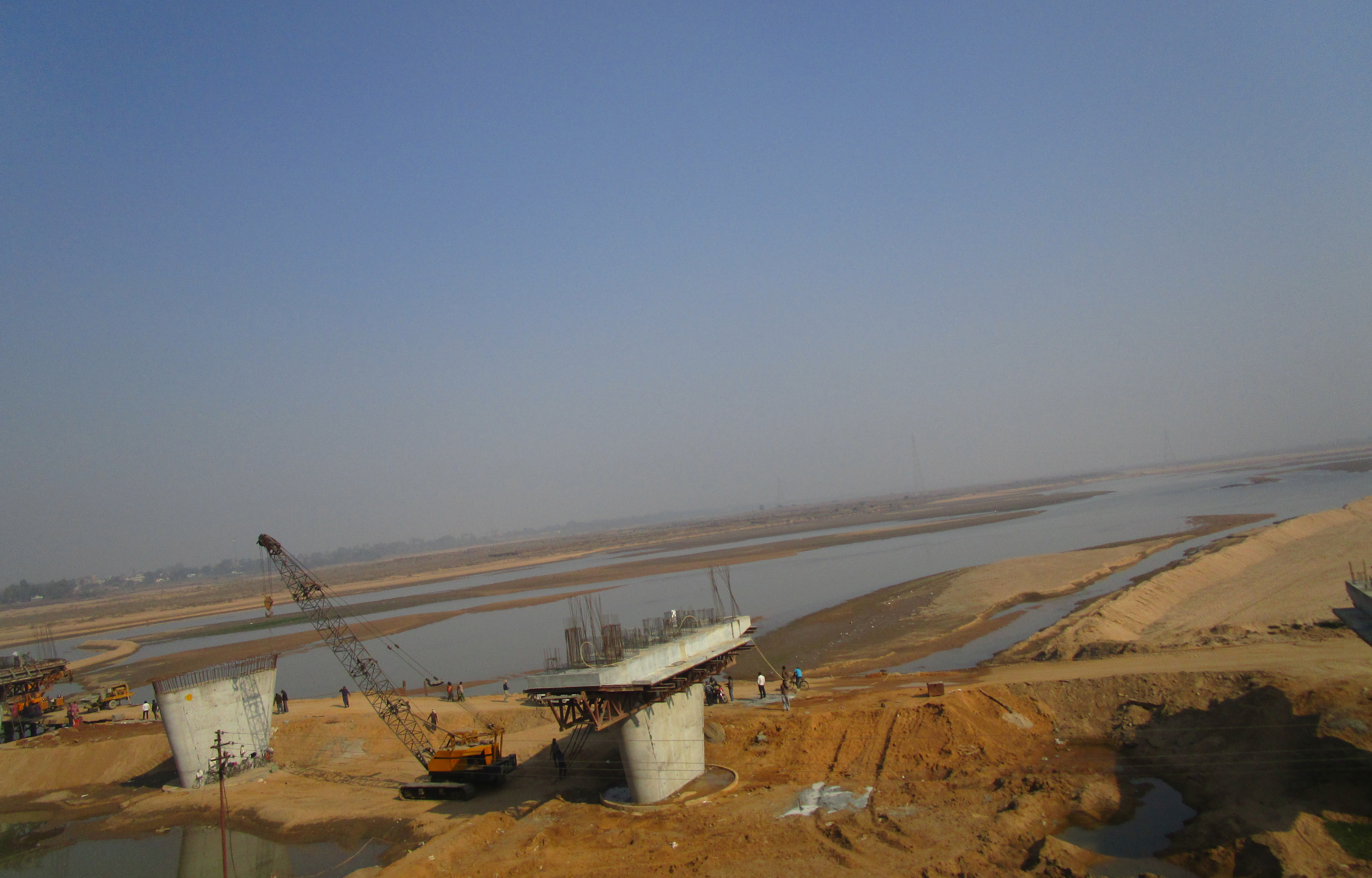
Sone River, from Son Nagar railway station, Aurangabad district, Bihar

== See also ==
- List of rivers of India
