= List of railway stations in India =

This is a list of railway stations in India. The railway operations are managed by Indian Railways (IR) in the country.

== A ==
List of Indian Railways stations whose names start with 'A'

Station name	Station code	city	Railway zone	Elevation	Notes
Abada	ABB	West Bengal	SER/South Eastern	7 m	
Abhaipur	AHA	Bihar	ER/Eastern	52 m	
Abhayapuri	AYU	Assam	NFR/Northeast Frontier	45 m	
Abohar Junction	ABS	Punjab	NR/Northern	186 m	
Abu Road	ABR	Rajasthan	NWR/North Western	260 m	
Abutara Halt	ABW	West Bengal	NFR/Northeast Frontier Railway	36 m	
Acharapakkam	ACK	Tamil Nadu	SR/Southern	39 m	
Acharya Narendra Dev Nagar	ACND	Uttar Pradesh	Northern	104 m	
Achalganj	ACH	Uttar Pradesh	NR/Northern	133 m	
Achalpur	ELP	Maharashtra	CR/Central	388 m	
Achhalda	ULD	Uttar Pradesh	NCR/North Central	147 m	
Achhnera Junction	AH	Uttar Pradesh	NCR/North Central	170 m	
Adambakkam	ABKM	Tamil Nadu	SR/Southern	45 m	
Adarshnagar	AHO	Rajasthan	NWR/North Western	472 m	
Adarshnagar Delhi	ANDI	Delhi	NR/Northern	215 m	
Adas Road	ADD	Gujarat	WR/Western	42 m	
Adesar	AAR	Gujarat	WR/Western	35 m	
Adgaon Buzurg	ABZ	Maharashtra	SCR/South Central	310 m	
Adilabad	ADB	Telangana	SCR/South Central	248 m	
Adipur Junction	AI	Gujarat	WR/Western	35 m	
Adisaptagram	ADST	West Bengal	ER/Eastern Railway	26.25 m	
Adityapur	ADTP	Jharkhand	SER/South Eastern	152 m	
Adoni	AD	Andhra Pradesh	SCoR/South Coast	421 m	
Adra Junction	ADRA	West Bengal	SER/South Eastern Railway	192 m	
Aduturai	ADT	Tamil Nadu	SR/Southern	24 m	
Agartala	AGTL	Tripura	NFR/Northeast Frontier Railway	25 m	
Agas	AGAS	Gujarat	WR/Western	42 m	
Agasod	AGD	Madhya Pradesh	NCR/North Central	427 m	
Aghwanpur	AWP	Uttar Pradesh	NR/Northern	211 m	
Agomani	AGMN	Assam	NFR/Northeast Frontier	31 m	
Agori Khas	AGY	Uttar Pradesh	NCR/North Central	210 m	
Agra Cantonment	AGC	Uttar Pradesh	NCR/North Central	174 m	
Agra City	AGA	Uttar Pradesh	NCR/North Central	165 m	
Agra Fort	AF	Uttar Pradesh	NCR/North Central	170 m	
Ahalyapur	AHLR	Uttar Pradesh	NER/North Eastern	80 m	
Ahmadgarh	AHH	Punjab	NR/Northern	252 m	
Ahilyanagar	ANG	Maharashtra	CR/Central	650 m	
Ahmadpur Junction	AMP	West Bengal	ER/Eastern Railway	46 m	
Ahmedabad Junction	ADI	Gujarat	WR/Western	51 m	
Ahraura Road	ARW	Uttar Pradesh	NCR/North Central	85 m	
Airoli	AIRL	Maharashtra	CR/Central	8 m	
Aishbagh	ASH	Uttar Pradesh	NER/North Eastern	122 m	
Ait	AIT	Uttar Pradesh	NCR/North Central	154 m	
Aithal	ATMO	Uttarakhand	NR/Northern	245 m	
Ajaibpur	AJR	Uttar Pradesh	NCR/North Central	206 m	
Ajanti	ANI	Madhya Pradesh	WR/Western	338 m	
Ajaraka	AIA	Rajasthan	NWR/North Western	280 m	
Ajgain	AJ	Uttar Pradesh	NR/Northern	128 m	
Ajhai	AJH	Uttar Pradesh	NFR/North Frontier	184 m	
Ajit	AJIT	Rajasthan	NWR/North Western	150 m	
Ajmer Junction	AII	Rajasthan	NWR/North Western	464 m	
Ajni	AJNI	Maharashtra	CR/Central	310 m	
Akalkot Road	AKOR	Maharashtra	CR/Central	457 m	
Akaltara	AKT	Chhattisgarh	SECR/South Eastern Central	284 m	
Akanapet	AKE	Telangana	SCR/South Central	566 m	
Akbarganj	AKJ	Uttar Pradesh	NR/Northern	112 m	
Akbarpur Junction	ABP	Uttar Pradesh	NR/Northern	95 m	
Akividu	AKVD	Andhra Pradesh	SCoR/South Coast	5 m	
Akodia	AKD	Madhya Pradesh	WR/Western	460 m	
Akola Junction	AK	Maharashtra	CR/Central	285 m	
Akolner	AKR	Maharashtra	CR/Central	692 m	
Akona	AKW	Uttar Pradesh	NCR/North Central	126 m	
Akot	AKOT	Maharashtra	SCR/South Central	308 m	
Akurdi	AKRD	Maharashtra	CR/Central	585 m	
Alamnagar	AMG	Uttar Pradesh	NR/Northern	129 m	
Aler	ALER	Telangana	SCR/South Central	368 m	
Algapur	ALGP	Assam	NFR/Northeast Frontier	25 m	
Algawan	AIG	Uttar Pradesh	NR/Northern	151 m	
Alia Bada	ALB	Gujarat	WR/Western	27 m	
Aligarh Junction	ALJN	Uttar Pradesh	NCR/North Central	191 m	
Alipurduar	APD	West Bengal	NFR/Northeast Frontier	49 m	
Alipurduar Junction	APDJ	West Bengal	NFR/Northeast Frontier Railway	53 m	
Alirajpur	ARPR	Madhya Pradesh	WR/Western Railway	278 m	
Allahabad City	ALY	Uttar Pradesh	NER/North Eastern	89 m	
Allahabad Junction	ALD	Uttar Pradesh	NCR/North Central	100 m	
Alappuzha	ALLP	Kerala	SR/Southern	8 m	
Almatti	LMT	Karnataka	SWR/South Western	535 m	
Alnavar Junction	LWR	Karnataka	SWR/South Western	567 m	
Alniya	ALNI	Rajasthan	WCR/Western Central	333 m	
Aluabari Road Junction	AUB	West Bengal	NFR/Northeast Frontier Railway	69 m	
Alwar Junction	AWR	Rajasthan	NWR/North Western	273 m	
Alwar Tirunagri	AWT	Tamil Nadu			
Aluva	AWY	Kerala	SR/Southern	15 m	
Amalner	AN	Maharashtra	WR/Western	187 m	
Amalsad	AML	Gujarat	WR/Western	14 m	
Aman Vadi	AMW	Maharashtra	SCR/South Central	420 m	
Amarpura	APA	Rajasthan	NWR/North Western	468 m	
Amausi	AMS	Uttar Pradesh	NR/Northern	126 m	
Amb Andaura	AADR	Himachal Pradesh	NR/Northern	458 m	
Ambagaon	AGB	Odisha	ECoR/East Coast	549 m	
Ambala Cantonment	UMB	Haryana	NR/Northern	276 m	
Ambala City	UBC	Haryana	NR/Northern	272 m	
Ambalappuzha	AMPA	Kerala	SR/Southern	7 m	
Ambale	ABLE	Maharashtra	CR/Central	729 m	
Ambari	ABX	Maharashtra	SCR/South Central	329 m	
Ambari Falakata	ABFC	West Bengal	NFR/Northeast Frontier	106 m	
Ambarnath	ABH	Maharashtra	CR/Central	23 m	
Ambassa	ABSA	Tripura	NFR/Northeast Frontier	90 m	
Ambasamudram	ASD	Tamil Nadu	SR/Southern	81 m	
Ambattur	ABU	Tamil Nadu	SR/Southern	19.18 m	
Ambaturai	ABI	Tamil Nadu	SR/Southern	306 m	
Ambiapur	AAP	Uttar Pradesh	NCR/North Central	140 m	
Ambika Kalna	ABKA	West Bengal	ER/Eastern	14 m	
Ambikapur	ABKP	Chhattisgarh	SECR/South East Central	615 m	
Ambikeshwar	ABE	Madhya Pradesh	NCR/North Central	196 m	
Ambivli	ABY	Maharashtra	CR/Central	18 m	
Ambli Road	ABD	Gujarat	WR/Western	51 m	
Ambliyasan Junction	UMN	Gujarat	WR/Western	91 m	
Ambodala	AMB	Odisha	ECoR/East Coast	373 m	
Ambur	AB	Tamil Nadu	SR/Southern	332 m	
Amethi	AME	Uttar Pradesh	NR/Northern	108 m	
Amgaon	AGN	Maharashtra	SECR/South Easr Central	317 m	
Amguri	AGI	Assam	NFR/Northeast Frontier	104 m	
Amla Junction	AMLA	Madhya Pradesh	CR/Central	733 m	
Amlai	AAL	Madhya Pradesh	SECR/South East Central	494 m	
Amlakhurd	AMX	Madhya Pradesh	SCR/South Central	323 m	
Amli	AMLI	Rajasthan	WCR/Western Central	238 m	
Ammasandra	AMSA	Karnataka	SWR/South Western	818 m	
Amoni	AONI	Assam	NFR/Northeast Frontier	72 m	
Amravati	AMI	Maharashtra	CR/Central	341 m	
Amreli	AE	Gujarat	WR/Western	127 m	
Amritsar Junction	ASR	Punjab	NR/Northern	230 m	
Amritvel	AVL	Gujarat	WR/Western	35 m	
Aranghata	AG	West Bengal	ER/Eartern	17 m	
Amroha	AMRO	Uttar Pradesh	NR/Northern	216 m	
Anakapalle	AKP	Andhra Pradesh	SCoR/South Coastal	32 m	
Anand Junction	ANND	Gujarat	WR/Western	44 m	
Anand Nagar Junction	ANDN	Uttar Pradesh	NER/North Eastern	86 m	
Anand Vihar	ANVT	Delhi	NR/Northern	212 m	
Anandpur Sahib	ANSB	Punjab	NR/Northern	297 m	
Anandtandavpur	ANP	Tamil Nadu	SR/Southern	10 m	
Anantapur	ATP	Andhra Pradesh	SCoR/South Coast	348 m	
Anantnag	ANT	Jammu and Kashmir	NR/Northern	1592 m	
Anaparti	APT	Andhra Pradesh	SCoR/South Coast	19 m	
Anara	ANR	West Bengal	SER/South Eastern	216 m	
Anas	ANAS	Gujarat	WR/Western	289 m	
Andal Junction	UDL	West Bengal	ER/Eastern	85 m	
Andheri	ADH	Maharashtra	WR/Western/Harbour(CR)	14 m	
Anekal Road	AEK	Karnataka	SR/Southern	910 m	
Angadippuram	AAM	Kerala	SR/Southern	46 m	
Angamaly	AFK	Kerala	SR/Southern	17 m	
Angar	AAG	Maharashtra	CR/Central	468 m	
Angul	ANGL	Odisha	ECoR/East Coastal Railway	119 m	
Anipur	APU	Assam	NFR/Northeast Frontier	40 m	
Anjangaon	ANJ	Maharashtra	CR/Central	347 m	
Anjani	ANO	Maharashtra	KR/Konkan	27 m	
Anjar	AJE	Gujarat	WR/Western	53 m	
Anjhi Shahabad	AJI	Uttar Pradesh	NR/Northern	149 m	
Ankai Killa	ANK	Maharashtra	CR/Central	622 m	
Ankleshwar Junction	AKV	Gujarat	WR/Western	19 m	
Ankleshwar Udyognagar	AKVU	Gujarat	WR/Western	22 m	
Ankola	ANKL	Karnataka	KR/Konkan	19 m	
Annanur	ANNR	Tamil Nadu	SR/Southern	24.28 m	
Annavaram	ANV	Andhra Pradesh	SCoR/South Coastal	28 m	
Annigeri	NGR	Karnataka	SWR/South Western	635 m	
Anpara	ANPR	Uttar Pradesh	ECR/East Central	330 m	
Antah	ATH	Rajasthan	WCR/West Central	249 m	
Antu	ANTU	Uttar Pradesh	NR/Northern	101 m	
Anugraha Narayan Road	AUBR	Bihar	ECR/East Central	104 m	
Anupgarh	APH	Rajasthan	NWR/North Western	154 m	
Anuppur Junction	APR	Madhya Pradesh	SECR/South Eastern Central	489 m	
Anupshahr	AUS	Rajasthan	NWR/North Western	205 m	
Aonla	AO	Uttar Pradesh	NR/Northern	176 m	
Ara Junction	ARA	Bihar	ECR/East Central	63 m	
Arabagatta H	ABGT	Karnataka	SCR/South Central	735 m	
Arakkonam Junction	AJJ	Tamil Nadu	SR/Southern railway	92 m	
Araku	ARK	Andhra Pradesh	SCoR/South Coast	925 m	
Aralvaymozhi	AAY	Tamil Nadu	SR/Southern	78 m	
Arambakkam	AKM	Tamil Nadu			
Arariya	ARR	Bihar	NFR/North East Frontier	57 m	
Arariya Court	ARQ	Bihar	NFR/North East Frontier	53 m	
Arasur	ARS	Tamil Nadu	SR/Southern	6 m	
Aravali Road	AVRD	Maharashtra	KR/Konkan	108 m	
Arunachal Junction	ARCL	Assam	NFR/Northeast Frontier	22 m	
Aravankadu	AVK	Tamil Nadu	SR/Southern	1888 m	
Ariyalur	ALU	Tamil Nadu	SR/Southern		
Argora	AOR	Jharkhand	SER/South Eastern	642 m	
Arjansar	AS	Rajasthan	NWR/North Western	199 m	
Arjuni	AJU	Maharashtra	SECR/South East Central	266 m	
Arnetha	ARE	Rajasthan	WCR/Western Central	238 m	
Arni Road	ARV	Tamil Nadu	SR/Southern	173 m	
Arsikere Junction	ASK	Karnataka	SWR/South Western	815 m	
Aruppukkottai	APK	Tamil Nadu	SR/Southern	102 m	
Arvi	ARVI	Maharashtra	CR/Central	303 m	
Aryankavu	AYV	Kerala	SR/Southern	274 m	
Asafpur	AFR	Uttar Pradesh	NR/Northern	186 m	
Asalpur Jobner	JOB	Rajasthan	NWR/North Western	378 m	
Asangaon	ASO	Maharashtra	CR/Central	77 m	
Asansol Junction	ASN	West Bengal	ER/Eastern	114 m	
Asaoti	AST	Haryana	NR/Northern	200 m	
Ashoknagar	ASKN	Madhya Pradesh	WCR/West Central	502 m	
Asthal Bohar Junction	ABO	Haryana	NR/Northern	223 m	
Aslana	ANA	Madhya Pradesh	WCR/West Central	373 m	
Aslaoda	ASL	Madhya Pradesh	WR/Western	490 m	
Asnoti	AT	Karnataka	KR/Konkan	6 m	
Asokhar	AXK	Madhya Pradesh	NCR/North Central	159 m	
Asranada	AAS	Rajasthan	NWR/North Western	251 m	
Attari	ATT	Punjab	NR/Northern	223 m	
Ataria	AA	Uttar Pradesh	NER/North Eastern	138 m	
Atarra	ATE	Uttar Pradesh	NCR/North Central	139 m	
Ateli	AEL	Haryana	NWR/North Western	286 m	
Atgaon	ATG	Maharashtra	CR/Central	147 m	
Athipattu	AIP	Tamil Nadu	SR/Southern	7 m	
Athipattu Pudhunagar	AIPP	Tamil Nadu	SR/Southern	4 m	
Atrampur	ARP	Uttar Pradesh	NR/Northern	105 m	
Atrauli Road	AUR	Uttar Pradesh	NR/Northern	190 m	
Atru	ATRU	Rajasthan	WCR/West Central	288 m	
Attabira	ATS	Odisha	ECoR/East Coast	162 m	
Attar	ATR	Madhya Pradesh	WR/Western	273 m	
Attur	ATTR	Tamil Nadu	SR/Southern	227 m	
Aujari	AJRE	Assam	NFR/Northeast Frontier	60 m	
Aulenda	AED	Uttar Pradesh	NCR/North Central	179 m	
Aunrihar Junction	ARJ	Uttar Pradesh	NER/North Eastern	79 m	
Chhatrapati Sambhajinagar	AWB	Maharashtra	SCR/South Central	558 m	
Auvaneeswarem	AVS	Kerala	SR/Southern	22 m	
Auwa	AUWA	Rajasthan	NWR/North Western	265 m	
Avadi	AVD	Tamil Nadu	SR/Southern	26.85 m	
Awantipora	ATPA	Jammu and Kashmir	NR/Northern	1589 m	
Ayodhya Junction	AY	Uttar Pradesh	NR/Northern	98 m	
Azamgarh	AMH	Uttar Pradesh	NER/North Eastern	81 m	
Azamnagar Road	AZR	Bihar	NFR/Northeast Frontier	34 m	
Azara	AZA	Assam	NFR/Northeast Frontier	51 m	
Azimganj City	ACLE	West Bengal	ER/Eastern	25 m	
Azimganj Junction	AZ	West Bengal	ER/Eastern	26 m	

== B ==
List of Indian Railways stations whose names start with 'B'

Station name	Station code	city	Railway zone	Elevation	Notes
Babarpur	BBDE	Haryana	NR/Northern	237 m	
Babatpur	BTP	Uttar Pradesh	Northern Railway zone	85 m	
Bebejia	BEE	Assam	NFR/Northeast Frontier	67 m	
Babhnan	BV	Uttar Pradesh	NER/North Eastern	99 m	
Babina	BAB	Madhya Pradesh	NCR/North Central	284 m	
Babrala	BBA	Uttar Pradesh	NR/Northern	185 m	
Babugarh	BBO	Uttar Pradesh	NR/Northern	219 m	
Babupeth	BUPH	Maharashtra	CR/Central	198 m	
Bacheli	BCHL	Chhattisgarh			
Bachhrawan	BGL	Uttar Pradesh			
Bachwara Junction	BCA	Bihar			
Badmal	BUDM	Odisha	ECoR/East Coast		
Balabhadrapuram	BBPM	Andhra Pradesh			
Badami	BDM	Karnataka	SWR/South Western Railway	586 m	
Badampahar	BMPR	Jharkhand			
Badampudi	BPY	Andhra Pradesh			
Badurpur Ghat	BPG	Assam	NFR/Northeast Frontier	27 m	
Badarpur Junction	BPB	Assam	NFR/Northeast Frontier	23 m	
Badausa	BUS	Uttar Pradesh	NCR/North Central		
Budgam	BDGM	Jammu & Kashmir	NR/ Northern	1588 m	
Badhada	BDHA	Gujarat	WR/Western	176 m	
Badhal	BDHL	Rajasthan	NWR/North Western	437 m	
Badlapur	BUD	Maharashtra	CR/Central	16.230 m	
Badli	BHD	Delhi	NR/Northern	218 m	
Badnapur	BDU	Maharashtra	SCR/South Central	523 m	
Badnera Junction	BD	Maharashtra	CR/Central	300 m	
Badshahnagar	BNZ	Uttar Pradesh	NER/North Eastern	123.5 m	
Badshahpur	BSE	Uttar Pradesh			
Badwasi	BWS	Rajasthan			
Bagaha	BUG	Bihar			
Bagalkot	BGK	Karnataka			
Bagbahra	BGBR	Chhattisgarh			
Bagetar	BF	Assam	NFR/Northeast Frontier	515 m	
Bagevadi Road	BSRX	Karnataka			
Baghajatin	BGJT	West Bengal	ER/Eastern Railway		
Baghauli	BGH	Uttar Pradesh			
Baghnapara	BGRA	West Bengal	ER/Eastern Railway	15 m	
Baghora	BJQ	Madhya Pradesh			
Bagra Tawa	BGTA	Madhya Pradesh			
Bagri Nagar	BQN	Rajasthan			
Bagri Sajjanpur	BGX	Rajasthan			
Bagula	BGL	West Bengal	ER/Eastern Railway		
Bagwali	BWB	Punjab			
Bahadur Singh Wala	BSS	Punjab			
Bahadurgarh	BGZ	Haryana			
Bahadurpur	BPD	West Bengal			
Baheri	BHI	Uttar Pradesh			
Bahilpurwa	BIP	Uttar Pradesh			
Bahirkhand	BHAW	West Bengal	Eastern Railway		
Bahjoi	BJ	Uttar Pradesh			
Bahraich	BRK	Uttar Pradesh			
Baidyanathdham Deoghar	BDME	Jharkhand	Eastern Railways	250	
Baihata Chariali	BIZ	Assam	NFR/Northeast Frontier	55 m	
Baiguda	BGUA	Odisha			
Baijnathpur	BYP	Bihar			
Baikunthpur Road	BRH	Chhattisgarh			
Boinchi	BOI	West Bengal	ER/Eastern Railway		
Bairabi (Bhairabi)	BHRB	Mizoram	NFR/Northeast Frontier	48 m	
Bairapur	BIP	Madhya Pradesh			
Bairgania	BGU	Bihar			
Baitalpur	BALR	Uttar Pradesh			
Bajalta	BLA	Jammu and Kashmir	NR/Northern	385 m	
Bajva	BJW	Gujarat			
Bakhtiyarpur Junction	BKP	Bihar			
Bakra Road	BK	Rajasthan			
Balaghat	BTC	Madhya Pradesh			
Balamau Junction	BLM	Uttar Pradesh			
Balangir	BLGR	Odisha			
Balasore	BLS	Odisha			
Balauda Takun	BLDK	Madhya Pradesh			
Balawala	BLWL	Rajasthan			
Balawali	BLW	Uttar Pradesh			
Balharshah	BPQ	Maharashtra			
Baliakheri	BAE	Uttar Pradesh			
Balikotia	BKS	Assam	NFR/Northeast Frontier	67 m	
Balipara	BVU	Assam			
Ballabhgarh	BVH	Haryana			
Balli	BLLI	Goa	KRCL	41	
Ballia	BUI	Uttar Pradesh			
Ballupur	BAPR	Uttar Pradesh			
Bally	BLY	West Bengal	ER/Eastern Railway		
Ballygunge Junction	BLN	West Bengal	ER/Eastern Railway		
Balrampur	BLP	Uttar Pradesh			
Balsamand	BLSD	Rajasthan			
Balugan	BALU	Odisha			
Balwa	WAB	Gujarat			
Balwara	BAWA	Rajasthan			
Bamangachhi	BMG	West Bengal	ER/Eastern Railway		
Bamanheri	BMHR	Uttar Pradesh			
Bamhni	BMW	Maharashtra			
Bamhni Banjar		Madhya Pradesh			
Bamla	BMLL	Haryana			
Bamnia	BMI	Madhya Pradesh			
Bamsin	BMSN	Rajasthan			
Bamra	BMB	Odisha			
Bamsin	BMSN	Rajasthan			
Bamuni Gaon	BGMN	Assam	NFR/Northeast Frontier	48 m	
Banahi	BYN				
Banapura	BPF	Madhya Pradesh			
Banar	BNO	Rajasthan			
Banarhat	BNQ	West Bengal	ER/Eastern Railway		
Banas	BNS	Rajasthan			
Banaswadi	BAND	Karnataka	SWR/South Western Railway		
Banasandra	BSN	Karnataka	SWR/South Western Railway		
Banbasa	BNSA				
Banda Junction	BNDA	Uttar Pradesh			
Bandakpur	BNU				
Bandanwara	BDW	Rajasthan			
Bandarkhal	BXK	Assam	NFR/Northeast Frontier	104 m	
Bandel Junction	BDC	West Bengal	ER/Eastern Railway		
Bandh Bareta	BR				
Bandikui Junction	BKI	Rajasthan			
Bandra	BA	Maharashtra	WR/Western/Harbour (CR)		
Bandra Terminus	BDTS	Maharashtra	WR/Western		
Bangalore Cantonment	BNC	Karnataka	SWR/South Western Railway		
Bangalore City	SBC	Karnataka	SWR/South Western Railway		
Bangalore City	BNCE	Karnataka	SWR/South Western Railway		
Bangarapet Junction	BWT	Karnataka	SWR/South Western Railway		
Bangarapet	BWY	Karnataka	SWR/South Western Railway		
Bangriposi	BGY	Odisha	East Coast Railway	109 m	
Bangrod	BOD				
Bani	BANI				
Banihal	BAHL	Jammu and Kashmir	NR/Northern	1705 m	
Baniya Sanda Dhora	BSDA				
Bankata	BTK				
Bankura Junction	BQA	West Bengal	ER/Eastern Railway		
Banmankhi Junction	BNKI	Bihar	ECR/East Central		
Banmor	BAO	Madhya Pradesh	NCR/North Central		
Bansdih Road	BCD	Uttar Pradesh	NER/North Eastern		
Banshlai Bridge	BSBR	West Bengal	ER/Eastern		
Bansi Paharpur	BIQ	Rajasthan	NCR/North Central		
Bansipur	BSQP				
Banasthali Niwai	BNLW	Rajasthan			
Banta Raghunathgarh	BGG				
Bantawala	BNTL	Karnataka			
Banthra	BTRA				
Banwali	BWC				
Baori Thikria	BOTI				
Bapatla	BPP	Andhra Pradesh			
Bar	BAR				
Bara Jamda	BJMD	Jharkhand			
Barabanki Junction	BBK	Uttar Pradesh			
Barabhum	BBM	West Bengal	ER/Eastern Railway		
Barbil	BBN	Odisha			
Baradwar	BUA				
Baragaon	BNM				
Barahu	BRHU	Assam	NFR/Northeast Frontier	58 m	
Baraigram Junction	BRGM	Assam	NFR/Northeast Frontier	24 m	
Barakar	BRR	West Bengal	ER/Eastern Railway		
Baral	BARL				
Baramati	BRMT	Maharashtra			
Baramulla	BRML	Jammu and Kashmir	NR/Northern	1577 m	
Baran	BAZ	Rajasthan			
Baranagar Road	BARN	West Bengal	ER/Eastern Railway	10 m	
Barara	RAA	Haryana			
Barasat Junction	BT	West Bengal	ER/Eastern Railway		
Baraut	BRT	Uttar Pradesh			
Barauni Junction	BJU	Bihar			
Barbatpur	BBTR				
Barbigha	BRBG	Bihar	ECR/East Central		
Barchi Road	BCRD				
Barddhaman Junction	BWN	West Bengal	Eastern Railway zone		
Bardoli	BIY	Gujarat	WR/Western		
Bareilly City	BE	Uttar Pradesh	Northern Railways		
Bareilly Junction	BRY	Uttar Pradesh	North Eastern Railways		
Bareilly Cantt	BRYC	Uttar Pradesh	Northern Railways		
Barejadi	BJD				
Bareta	BRZ				
Bareth	BET	Madhya Pradesh			
Bargarh Road	BRGA	Odisha			
Bargawan	BRGW				
Barh	BARH	Bihar			
Barhan Junction	BRN	Uttar Pradesh	North Central Railway zone	176.67m	
Barharwa Junction	BHW	Jharkhand	ECR/East Central Railway		
Barhiya	BRYA	Bihar			
Barhni	BNY	Uttar Pradesh			
Bari Brahman	BBMN	Jammu & Kashmir	NR/Northern	335 m	
Bariarpur	BUP	Bihar			
Barkakana	BRKA	Jharkhand			
Barkur	BKJ	Karnataka	KRCL		
Barlai	BLAX				
Barmer	BME	Rajasthan	NWR/North Western Railway		
Barnagar	BNG	West Bengal	ER/Eastern Railway		
Barnala	BNN	Punjab	NR/Northern	228.86 m	
Barog	BOF	Himachal Pradesh			
Barpali	BRPL	Odisha			
Barpeta Road	BPRD	Assam	NFR/Northeast Frontier	51 m	bhobho
Barrackpore	BP	West Bengal	ER/Eastern Railway		
Barsathi	BSY				
Barshitakli	BSQ	Maharashtra			
Barsi Town	BTW	Maharashtra			
Barsoi Junction	BOE	Bihar			
Barsola	BZO				
Barsuan	BXF	Odisha			
Bartara	BTRA	Uttar Pradesh			
Baruva	BAV				
Baruipur Junction	BRP	West Bengal	ER/Eastern Railway		
Barwa Sagar	BWR				
Barwadih Junction	BRWD	Jharkhand			
Barwaha	BWW				
Barya Ram	BYHA				
Basai	BZY				
Basantar Block Hut	BHBT	Jammu and Kashmir	NR/Northern	357 m	
Basar	BSX	Telangana			
Basbari	BSI	Assam	NFR/Northeast Frontier	47 m	
Basharatganj	BTG				
Basi Kiratpur	BSKR				
Basin Bridge	BBQ	Tamil Nadu	SR/Southern	7 m	
Basmath	BMF	Maharashtra			
Basni	BANE	Rajasthan			
Bassi Pathana	BSPN	Punjab			
Basta	BTS	Odisha	SER/South Eastern Railway		
Basti	BST	Uttar Pradesh			
Basugaon	BSGN	Assam	NFR/Northeast Frontier	53 m	
Baswa	BU				
Batadrowa Road	BTDR	Assam	NFR/Northeast Frontier	69 m	
Batala Junction	BAT	Punjab	NR/Northern	247.19 m	
Bathinda Cantonment	BTIC	Punjab	NR/Northern	208 m	
Bathinda Junction	BTI	Punjab	NR/Northern	206.65 m	
Batuva	BTVA	Andhra pradesh	ECoR/East Coast Railway		
Bauria Junction	BVA	West Bengal	SER/South Eastern Railway		
Bavla	VLA				
Bawal	BWL	Haryana			
Bawani Khera	BWK	Haryana			
Bayana Junction	BXN	Rajasthan			
Baytu	BUT				
Bazida Jatan	BZJT	Haryana			
Bajpur	BPZ	Uttarakhand			
Bazurghat	BZGT	Assam	NFR/Northeast Frontier	37 m	
Beas Junction	BEAS	Punjab	NR/Northern	233 m	
Beawar	BER	Rajasthan			
Begunkodor	BKDR	West Bengal	ER/Eastern Railway		
Bedetti	BVV				
Begampet	BMT	Telangana			
Begusarai	BGS	Bihar			
Behtagokul	BEG				
Behula	BHLA	West Bengal	ER/Eastern Railway		
Bejnal	BJN				
Bela Tal	BTX	Uttar Pradesh			
Belampalli	BPA	Telangana			
Belandur Road	BLRR	Karnataka(Bangalore)			
Belapur	BAP	Maharashtra	CR/Central Railways		
Belgahna	BIG				
Belgharia	BEL	WEST BENGAL			
Belgaum	BGM	Karnataka	SWR/South Western Railway		
Belha	BYL				
Bellary Junction	BAY	Karnataka	SWR/South Western Railway		
Bellary Cantonment	BYC	Karnataka	SWR/South Western Railway	469	
Belpahar	BPH	Odisha			
Belrayan	BXM				
Belsiri	BLRE				
Belthara Road	BLTR	Uttar Pradesh			
Belur	BEQ				
Belvandi	BWD				
Beohari	BEHR	Madhya Pradesh			
Berchha	BCH	Madhya Pradesh			
Berhampore Court	BPC	West Bengal	ER/Eastern Railway		
Brahmapur	BAM	Odisha			
Besroli	BSRL				
Betavad	BEW				
Bettiah	BTH	Bihar			
Bethamcherla	BMH	Andhra Pradesh			
Betul	BZU	Madhya Pradesh			
Bhabhar	BAH				
Bhabua Road	BBU	Bihar	ECR/East Central Railway		
Bhachau	BCO	Gujarat			
Bhadan	BDN	Uttar Pradesh	NCR/North Central Railway		
Bhadaura	BWH				
Bhadbhadaghat	BVB				
Bhadli	BDI				
Bhadohi	BOY	Uttar Pradesh	Northern Railway		
Bhadra	BHD	Rajasthan			
Bhadrachalam Road	BDCR	Telangana			
Bhadrak	BHC	Odisha			
Bhadran		Gujarat			
Bhadravathi	BDVT	Karnataka	SWR/South Western Railway		
Bhadroli	BBY				
Bhaga Junction	VAA				
Bhagalpur	BGP	Bihar			
Bhagat Ki Kothi	BGKT	Rajasthan	NWR/North Western Railway		
Bhagega	BAGA				
Bhagtanwala	BGTN				
Bhagwanpur	BNR				
Bhagwanpura	BGPR				
Bhaini Khurd	BZK	Haryana			
Bhairongarh	BOG				
Bhakti Nagar	BKNG	Gujarat	129.63		
Bhalki	BHLK	Karnataka	SCR/South Central Railway		
Bhalumaska	BLMK	Odisha	ECoR/East Coastal Railway		
Bhanapur	BNP				
Bhandak	BUX	Maharashtra			
Bhandara Road	BRD	Maharashtra	SECR/South East Central	265 m	
Bhandup	BND	Maharashtra	CR/Central		
Bhanga	BXG	Assam	NFR/Northeast Frontier	21 m	
Bhankoda	BKD				
Bharat Kup	BTKP				
Bharatkund	BTKD				
Bharatpur Junction	BTE	Rajasthan			
Bharatwada	BWRA				
Bharoli Junction	BHRL	Punjab	NR/Northern	320 m	
Bharthana	BNT	Uttar Pradesh	NCR/North Central Railway	135 m	
Bharuch Junction	BH	Gujarat			
Bharwa Sumerpur	BSZ				
Bharwari	BRE				
Bhatel	BHTL				
Bhatgaon	BOV				
Bhatiya	BHV				
Bhatkal	BTJL	Karnataka	KR/Konkan Railway		
Bhatni Junction	BTT	Uttar Pradesh			
Bhaton Ki Gali	BHG				
Bhatpar Rani	BHTR				
Bhatpur	BTPR				
Bhattu	BHT	Haryana			
Bhaunra	BNVD				
Bhavnagar Para railway station	BVP	Gujarat	Western Railway (India)		
Bhavani Nagar	BVNR				
Bhavnagar Terminus railway station	BVC	Gujarat	Western Railway (India)		
Bhawani Mandi	BWM	Rajasthan			
Bhawanipatna	BWIP	Odisha	East Coast		
Bhawanipur Kalan	BWP				
Bhayandar	BYR	Maharashtra	WR/Western		
Bhayavadar	BHY	Gujarat			
Bheempura	BIPR	Rajasthan			
Bheerpur	BEP				
Bhemswadi	BSWD				
Bheraghat	BRGT	Madhya Pradesh			
Bhesana	BFY				
Bhigwan	BGVN				
Bhilad	BLD	Gujarat			
Bhilai Power House	BPHB	Chhattisgarh			
Bhilainagar	BQR	Chhattisgarh			
Bhilavdi	BVQ				
Bhildi	BLDI	Gujarat			
Bhilwara	BHL	Rajasthan			
Bhimal	BIML				
Bhimana	BMN				
Bhimarlai	BMQ				
Bhimasar	BMSR				
Bhimavaram Junction	BVRM	Andhra Pradesh			
Bhimavaram Town	BVRT	Andhra Pradesh			
Bhimnath	BNH				
Bhimsen	BZM	Uttar Pradesh			
Bhind	BIX	Madhya Pradesh			
Bhinwaliya	BWA				
Bhitaura	BTO				
Bhivpuri Road		Maharashtra	CR/Central		
Bhiwandi	BIRD	Maharashtra	CR/Central		
Bhiwani	BNW	Haryana			
Bhiwani City	BNWC	Haryana			
Bhodwal Majri	BDMJ	Haryana			
Bhogpur Sirwal	BPRS	Punjab			
Bhojipura Junction	BPR	Uttar Pradesh			
Bhojo	BOJ				
Bhojras	BHAS				
Bhojudih Junction	BJE	Jharkhand	ECR/East Central Railway		
Bhoke	BOKE				
Bhone	BHNE				
Bhongaon	BGQ	Uttar Pradesh			
Bhongir	BG	Telangana			
Bhopal Bairagarh	BIH	Madhya Pradesh			
Bhopal Dewanganj	DWN	Madhya Pradesh			
Habibganj	HBJ	Madhya Pradesh			
Bhopal Junction	BPL	Madhya Pradesh			
Bhopal Mandideep	BMND	Madhya Pradesh			
Bhopal Misrod	BMSD	Madhya Pradesh			
Bhopal Nishatpura	BNTP	Madhya Pradesh			
Bhubaneswar	BBS	Odisha	ECoR/ East Coast Railway	45 m	
Bhuj	BHUJ	Gujarat			
Bhupalsagar	BSJ				
Bhupia Mau	VPO				
Bhusaval Junction	BSL	Maharashtra			
Bhutakia Bhimsa	BUBR				
Bibinagar Junction	BN	Telangana			
Bichia	BIC				
Bichpuri	BCP	Uttar Pradesh			
Bidadi	BID	Karnataka			
Bidanpur	BDNP				
Bidar	BIDR	Karnataka			
Bidhan Nagar Road	BNXR	West Bengal	ER/Eastern Railway		
Bidupur	BIU	Bihar			
Bidyadabri	BDYR	Assam	NFR/Northeast Frontier	31 m	
Bighapur	BQP				
Bihara	BHZ	Assam	NFR/Northeast Frontier	29 m	
Bihar Sharif	BEHS	Bihar			
Bihiya	BEA	Bihar			
Bihta	BTA	Bihar			
Bijainagar	BJNR				
Bijapur	BJP	Karnataka			
Bijauli	BJI				
Bijaysota	VST				
Bijbiara	BJBA	Jammu and Kashmir	NR/Northern	1599 m	
Bijni	BJF	Assam	NFR/Northeast Frontier	55 m	
Bijnor	BJO	Uttar Pradesh			
Bijoor	BIJR	Karnataka			
Bijora	BJK				
Bijrotha	BJA				
Bijuri	BJRI				
Bikaner Junction	BKN	Rajasthan			
Bikrampur	BMR				
Bilaspur	BSP	Chhattisgarh	SECR / South East Central		
Bilaspur Road	BLOR	Himachal Pradesh			
Bildi	BILD				
Bilhar Ghat	BLG				
Bilhaur	BLU				
Bilimora Junction	BIM	Gujarat			
Bilkha	BILK				
Billi	BXLL				
Bilpur	BLPU				
Bilwai	BWI				
Bina Junction	BINA	Madhya Pradesh			
Binaur	BNAR				
Bindki Road	BKO	Uttar Pradesh	NCR/North Central Railway		
Binnaguri	BNV	West Bengal	NFR/Northeast Frontier Railway		
Bir	BIR				
Biradhwal	BDWL				
Birambad	BAMA				
Birang Khera	BMK				
Birapatti	BRPT				
Birati	BBT	West Bengal	ER/Eastern Railway		
Birlanagar	BLNR	Madhya Pradesh			
Birmitrapur	BRMP	Odisha			
Birohe	BEO				
Biroliya	BRLY				
Birsinghpur	BRS				
Birur	RRB	Karnataka			
Bisalwas Kalan	BIWK				
Bishangarh	BISH	Rajasthan			
Bishnathganj	BTJ				
Bishnupur	VSU	West Bengal	ER/Eastern Railway		
Bishrampur	BSPR	Chhattisgarh			
Bissam Cuttack	BMCK	Odisha			
Bissau	BUB	Rajasthan			
Biswa Bridge	BIS	Maharashtra			
Biswan	BVN				
Biyavra	BVR	Madhya Pradesh			
Biyavra Rajgarh	BRRG	Madhya Pradesh			
Bobas	BOBS				
Bobbili Junction	VBL	Andhra Pradesh			
Bodeli	BDE	Gujarat	WR		
Bodhan	BDHN	Telangana			
Bodwad	BDWD				
Boinda	BONA	Odisha			
Boisar	BOR	Maharashtra	WR/Western		
Bokajan	BXJ	Assam			
Bokaro Steel City	BKSC	Jharkhand	SER/South Eastern Railway		
Bokaro Thermal	BKRO	Jharkhand	SER/South Eastern Railway		
Boko	BOKO	Assam	NFR/Northeast Frontier	48 m	
Bolai	BLX				
Bolarum	BMO	Telangana			
Bolda	BLC				
Bolpur — Santiniketan	BHP	West Bengal	ER/Eastern Railway		
Bommidi	BQI	Andhra Pradesh			
Bongaigaon	BNGN	Assam	NFR/Northeast Frontier	60 m	
Borawar	BOW	Rajasthan			
Bordhal	BXY				
Bordi	BIO				
Bordi Road	BRRD	Maharashtra	WR/Western		
Borgaon	BGN				
Borivali	BVI	Maharashtra	WR/Western		
Borra Guhalu	BGHU	Andhra Pradesh			
Borvihir	BRVR				
Botad Junction	BTD	Gujarat			
Boxirhat	BXHT	Assam	NFR/Northeast Frontier	31 m	
Brahmavart	BRT				
Brajarajnagar	BRJN	Odisha			
Brayla Chaurasi	BRLA				
Budalur	BAL				
Budaun	BEM	Uttar Pradesh	North Eastern Railway zone		
Budge Budge	KBGB	West Bengal	ER/Eastern Railway		
Budhi	BDHY	Jammu and Kashmir	NR/Northern	361 m	
Budhlada	BLZ	Punjab			
Budni	BNI	Madhya Pradesh			
Bulandshahr	BSC	Uttar Pradesh			
Bundi	BUDI	Rajasthan			
Bundki	BEK				
Burdwan		West Bengal	ER/Eastern Railway		
Burhanpur	BAU	Madhya Pradesh			
Burhar	BUH	Madhya Pradesh			
Burhwal	BUW				
Burnpur	BURN	West Bengal	ER/Eastern Railway		
Butari	BTR				
Butewala	BWF				
Buxar	BXR	Bihar			
Byadarahalli	BDRL	Karnataka			
Byculla	BY	Maharashtra	CR/Central		
Boridand	BRND	Chhattisgarh			
Barai Jalalpur		Uttar Pradesh			
Bangaon	BNJ	West Bengal	ER/Eastern Railway		
B.B.D. Bag	BBDB	West Bengal	ER/Eastern Railway		
Budge Budge	BGB	West Bengal	ER/Eastern Railway		
Bamangachi	BMG	West Bengal	ER/Eastern Railway		
Bira	BIRA	West Bengal	ER/Eastern Railway		
Birati	BBT	West Bengal	ER/Eastern Railway		
Bibhuti Bhushan Halt	BNAA	West Bengal	ER/Eastern Railway		
Belur	BEQ	West Bengal	ER/Eastern Railway		
Belur Math	BEQM	West Bengal	ER/Eastern Railway		
Bisharpara Kodaliya	BRPK	West Bengal	ER/Eastern Railway		
Baghbazar	BBR	West Bengal	ER/Eastern Railway		
Burra Bazar	BZR	West Bengal	ER/Eastern Railway		
Birnagar	BIJ	West Bengal	ER/Eastern Railway		
Beldanga	BEB	West Bengal	ER/Eastern Railway		

== C ==
List of Indian Railways stations whose names start with 'C'

Station name	Station code	State	Railway zone	Elevation	Map
Chatrapur	CAP	Odisha			
C Shahumaharaj T	KOP	Maharashtra	CR		
Kozhikode	CLT	Kerala			
Canacona railway station	CNO	Goa	KRCL	6	
Cansaulim railway station	CSM	Goa	SWR	15	
Caranzol railway station	CRZ	Goa	SWR	179	
Kannur	CAN	Kerala			
Cannanore South	CS	Kerala			
Carmelaram (Sarjapur Road, Bangalore)	CRLM	Karnataka	Zone: SWR/South Western, Division: Bangalore		
Castle Rock	CLR	Karnataka			
CBD Belapur	BR	Maharashtra	Harbour (CR)		
Chandanathope		Kerala			
Chabua	CHB	Assam			
Chachaura Bngj	CBK				
Chadotar	CDQ				
Chaibasa	CBSA	Jharkhand			
Chainwa	CW				
Chajawa	CJW				
Chajli	CJL				
Chak Dayala	CKDL	Jammu and Kashmir	NR/Northern	387 m	
Chak Rakhwal	CRWL	Jammu and Kashmir	NR/Northern	710 m	
Chakdaha	CDH	West Bengal			
Chakehri(Kanpur)	CHK	Uttar Pradesh			
Chakia	CAA	Bihar			
Chakradharpur	CKP	Jharkhand			
Chakraj Mal	CAJ				
Chaksu	CKS	Rajasthan			
Chakulia	CKU	Jharkhand			
Chalakudy	CKI	Kerala			
Chalala	CLC	Gujarat			
Chalisgaon Junction	CSN	Maharashtra			
Challakere	CLK	Karnataka			
Chalthan	CHM	Gujarat			
Chamagram	CMX				
Chamarajanagar	CMNR	Karnataka			
Champa	CPH	Chhattisgarh			
Champaner Rd Junction	CPN	Gujarat			
Chamraura	CHRU				
Chand Siau	CPS				
Chanda Fort	CAF	Maharashtra			
Chandan Nagar	CGR	West Bengal			
Chandar railway station	CNR	Goa	SWR	6	
Chandari(Kanpur)	CNBI	Uttar Pradesh			
Chandauli Majhwar	CDMR	Uttar Pradesh			
Chandausi Junction	CH	Uttar Pradesh			
Chandawal	CNL				
Chanderiya	CNA	Rajasthan	WR/Western Railway		
Chandi Mandir	CNDM	Himachal Pradesh			
Chandia Road	CHD	Madhya Pradesh			
Chandigarh	CDG	Chandigarh			
Chandil Junction	CNI	Jharkhand			
Chandiposi	CPE				
Chandisar	CDS				
Chandkhira Bagn	CHBN	Assam	NFR/Northeast Frontier	39 m	
Chandlodiya	CLDY	Gujarat			
Chandok	CNK	Uttar Pradesh			
Chandranathpur	CNE	Assam	NFR/Northeast Frontier	37 m	
Chandrapur	CD	Maharashtra			
Chandrapura	CRP	Jharkhand			
Chandresal	CDSL				
Chandur	CND	Maharashtra			
Chaneti	CHTI				
Changanacheri	CGY	Kerala			
Changsari	CGS	Assam	NFR/Northeast Frontier	54 m	
Channani	CHNN				
Channapatna	CPT	Karnataka	South Western Railway		
Chanpatia	CAI	Bihar			
Chaparmukh Junction	CPK	Assam	NFR/Northeast Frontier	65 m	
Chaprakata	CPQ	Assam	NFR/Northeast Frontier	57 m	
Charaud	CRW				
Charbagh	LKO	Uttar Pradesh			
Charbatia	CBT				
Charbhuja Road	CBG				
Chargola	CGX	Assam	NFR/Northeast Frontier	21 m	
Charkhari Road	CRC	Uttar Pradesh			
Charkhi Dadri	CKD	Haryana			
Charni Road	CYR	Maharashtra	WR/Western		
Charvattur	CHV				
Chata	CHJ	Uttar Pradesh			
Chau Mahla	CMU				
Chaube	CBH				
Chaukhandi	CHH				
Chaunrah	CNH	Uttar Pradesh			
Chaurakheri	CRKR				
Chaure Bazar	CHBR				
Chauri Chaura	CC	Uttar Pradesh			
Chausa	CSA	Bihar			
Chautara	CROA	Assam	NFR/Northeast Frontier	48 m	
Chauth Ka Brwra	CKB				
Chavalkhede	CHLK				
Chawapall	CHA				
Chaygaon	CGON	Assam	NFR/Northeast Frontier	48 m	
Chemancheri	CMC	Tamil Nadu			
Chembur	CMBR	Maharashtra	Harbour (CR)		
Chengalpattu	CGL	Tamil Nadu			
Chengannur	CNGR	Kerala	SR/Southern	6 m	
Chennai Beach	MSB	Tamil Nadu			
Chennai Egmore	MS	Tamil Nadu			
Chennai Fort	MSF	Tamil Nadu			
Chennai Park	MPK	Tamil Nadu			
Chepauk	MCPK	Tamil Nadu			
Cheriyanad	CYN	Kerala			
Cherthala	SRTL	Kerala			
Chetar	CTQ				
Chetput	MSC	Tamil Nadu			
Chettinad	CTND	Tamil Nadu			
Chhabra Gugor	CAG				
Chhan Arorian	CHNR	Jammu and Kashmir	NR/Northern	390 m	
Chhandrauli	CDRL				
Chhansara	CASA				
Chhapi	CHP	Gujarat			
Chhapra	CPR	Bihar			
Chhapra Kacheri	CI	Bihar			
Chharodi	CE				
Chhatrapati Shivaji Terminus	CSTM	Maharashtra	CR/Central/Harbour		
Chhatarpur	MCSC	Madhya Pradesh			
Chatrapur	CAP	Odisha			
Chhidgaon	CGO				
Chhina	CHN				
Chhindwara Junction	CWA	Madhya Pradesh			
Chhipadohar	CPDR				
Chhitauni	CTE	Uttar Pradesh			
Chhota Gudha	COD				
Chhota Udaipur	CTD	Gujarat	WR		
Chhoti Odai	COO				
Chianki	CNF	Jharkhand			
Chidambaram	CDM	Tamil Nadu			
Chiheru	CEU				
Chikballapur	CBP	Karnataka			
Chikkamagaluru	CMGR	Karnataka	South Western Railway		
Chikalthan	CTH				
Chikjajur Junction	JRU	Karnataka			
Chikni Road	CKNI	Maharashtra			
Chikodi Road	CKR	Karnataka			
Chilbila Junction	CIL				
Chilka	CLKA	Odisha			
Chilo	CLO				
Chinchli	CNC				
Chinchpada	CPD	Maharashtra			
Chinchpokli	CHG	Maharashtra	CR/Central		
Chinchwad	CCH	Maharashtra			
Chinna Babu Samudram	CMSM	Tamil Nadu			
Chinna Ganjam	CJM	Andhra Pradesh			
Chinna Salem	CHSM	Tamil Nadu			
Chintadripet	MCP	Tamil Nadu			
Chintamani	CMY	Karnataka			
Chiplun	CHI	Maharashtra	KR / Konkan Railway	12 m	
Chipurupalle	CPP	Andhra Pradesh			
Chirai	CHII				
Chirala	CLX	Andhra Pradesh			
Chirawa	CRWA	Rajasthan			
Chirayinkil	CRY	Kerala			
Chirgaon	CGN	Uttar Pradesh			
Chirmiri	CHRM	Chhattisgarh			
Chit Baragaon	CBN				
Chitahra	CTHR				
Chital	CTL				
Chitali	CIT				
Chitradurga	CTA	Karnataka			
Chitrakuta	CKTD	Madhya Pradesh			
Chitrapur	CTTP	Karnataka	KRCL		
Chitrasani	CTT				
Chitrawad	CTRD				
Chitrod	COE				
Chitapur	CT	Karnataka			
Chittaranjan	CRJ	West Bengal			
Chittaurgarh	COR	Rajasthan			
Chittoor	CTO	Andhra Pradesh	SC Railway		
Chodiala	CDL	Uttarakhand			
Choki Sorath	CKE				
Chola (Bulandshahr)	CHL	Uttar Pradesh			
Cholang	CGH				
Chomun Samod	COM	Rajasthan			
Chondi	CWI				
Chopan	CPU	Uttar Pradesh			
Choral	CRL				
Chorvad Road	CVR	Gujarat			
Chosla	CSL				
Choti Khatu	CTKT				
Chromepet	CMP	Tamil Nadu			
Chuchura	CNS	West Bengal			
Chuda	CDA				
Chunabhatti	CHF	Maharashtra	Harbour (CR)		
Chunar	CAR	Uttar Pradesh			
Churchgate	CCG	Maharashtra	WR/Western		
Churk	CUK	Uttar Pradesh			
Churu	CUR	Rajasthan			
Clutterbuckganj	CBJ	Uttar Pradesh			
Cochin Harbour Terminus	CHTS	Kerala			
Coimbatore Junction	CBE	Tamil Nadu			
Coimbatore North Junction	CBF	Tamil Nadu			
Colonelganj	CLJ	Uttar Pradesh			
Contai Road	CNT	West Bengal			
Coonoor	ONR	Tamil Nadu			
Cotton Green	CTGN	Maharashtra	Harbour (CR)		
Cuddalore Junction	COT	Tamil Nadu			
Cuddalore Port	CUPJ	Tamil Nadu			
Cuddapah	HX	Andhra Pradesh			
Cumbum	CBM	Tamil Nadu			
Cuttack	CTC	Odisha			
Currey Road	CRD	Maharashtra	CR/Central		

== D ==
List of Indian Railways stations whose names start with 'D'

Station name	Station code	city	Railway zone	Elevation	Map
Dabhaura	DBR				
Dabhoi Junction	DB	Gujarat	WR		
Dabilpur	DBV	Telangana			
Dabla	DBLA				
Dabli Rathan	DBI				
Dabolim railway station	DBM	Goa	SWR	50	
Dabra	DBA	Madhya Pradesh	Central		
Dabtara	DUB				
Dadar (Western Railway)	DDR	Maharashtra	WR/Western		
Dadar (Central Railway)	DR	Maharashtra	CR/Central		
Dadri	DER				
Dagaon	DGX	Assam	NFR/Northeast Frontier	67 m	
Dagmagpur	DAP				
Dahanu Road	DRD	Maharashtra	WR/Western		
Dahar Ka Balaji	DKBJ				
Dahina Zainabad	DZB				
Dahisar	DIC	Maharashtra	WR/Western		
Dahod	DHD	Gujarat			
Dailwara	DWA				
Dakaniya Talav	DKNT	Rajasthan	WCR/West Central		
Dakhineswar	DAKE	West Bengal			
Dakor	DK				
Daladi	DL				
Dalauda	DLD				
Dalelnagar	DLQ				
Dalgaon	DLO	West Bengal			
Daliganj	DAL				
Dalhousie Road	DALR	Punjab			
Dalkhola	DLK	West Bengal			
Dalli-Rajhara	DRZ	Chhattisgarh			
Dalmau Junction	DMW				
Dalmera	DLC				
Dalpatpur	DLP				
Dalsingh Sarai	DSS	Bihar			
Daltonganj	DTO	Jharkhand			
Damanjodi	DMNJ	Odisha			
Damchara	DCA	Assam	NFR/Northeast Frontier	55 m	
Damnagar	DME				
Damoh	DMO	Madhya Pradesh			
Danapur	DNR	Bihar			
Dandeli	DED				
Dandupur	DND				
Dangoaposi	DPS	Jharkhand			
Dangtal	DTX	Assam	NFR/Northeast Frontier	52 m	
Daniyawan Bzr H	DNWH				
Dankaur	DKDE				
Dankuni	DKAE	West Bengal	ER/Eastern Railways	7 m	
Danwar	DAR				
Dapodi	DAPD	Maharashtra			
Dappar	DHPR	Punjab			
Daotuhaja	DJA	Assam	NFR/Northeast Frontier	401 m	
Dara	DARA				
Daraganj	DRGJ				
Darbhanga	DBG	Bihar			
Darjeeling	DJ	West Bengal	NFR/Northeast Frontier		
Darritola	DTL	Chhattisgarh			
Daryabad	DYD	Uttar Pradesh			
Daryapur	DYP				
Dasna	DS				
Dasuya	DZA	Punjab	NR		
Datia	DAA	Madhya Pradesh			
Dativali	DTV	Maharashtra	CR/Central		
Daudpur	DDP	Bihar	NR	60 m	
Daulatabad	DLB	Maharashtra			
Daund Junction	DD	Maharashtra			
Daundaj	DUD	Maharashtra			
Daurai	DOZ				
Daurala	DRLA				
Dauram Madhpura	DMH				
Dausa	DO	Rajasthan			
Dausni	DSNI				
Davanagere	DVG	Karnataka			
Dayalpur	DLPR				
Debari	DRB				
Debipur	DBP		ER/Eastern Railways		
Degana Junction	DNA				
Dehradun	DDN	Uttarakhand			
Dehri On Sone	DOS	Bihar			
Dehu Road	DEHR	Maharashtra			
Dekapam	DKPM				
Delhi	DLI	Delhi			
Delhi MG	DE	Delhi			
Delhi Azadpur	DAZ	Delhi			
Delhi Cantonment	DEC	Delhi			
Delhi Kishanganj	DKZ	Delhi			
Sarai Rohilla	DEE	Delhi			
Delhi Safdarjung	DSJ	Delhi			
Shahdara	DSA	Delhi			
Delvada	DVA	Gujarat			
Demu	DEMU				
Deoband	DBD	Uttar Pradesh			
Deogan Road	DFR				
Deoghar Junction	DGHR	Jharkhand			
Deorakot	DELO				
Deoria Sadar	DEOS	Uttar Pradesh	NR		
Depalsar	DEP				
Derol	DRL				
Derowan	DRWN				
Desari	DES				
Deshalpar	DSLP				
Deshnok	DSO	Rajasthan			
Deswal	DSL				
Detroj	DTJ				
Devakottai Road	DKO	Tamil Nadu			
Devbaloda Charoda	DBEC	Chhattisgarh			
Devgam	DVGM				
Devgarh Madriya	DOHM				
Devlali	DVL	Maharashtra			
Devpura	DPZ				
Dewalgaon	DEW				
Dewanganj	DWG	Madhya Pradesh			
Dewas	DWX	Madhya Pradesh			
Dhaban	DABN				
Dhalaibil	DQL				
Dhalgaon	DLGN	Maharashtra			
Dhalpukhuri	DHRY	Assam	NFR/Northeast Frontier	84 m	
Dhamangaon	DMN	Maharashtra			
Dhamni	DNE				
Dhamora	DAM				
Dhampur	DPR				
Dhamtari	DTR	Chhattisgarh			
Dhamua	DMU				
Dhana Kherli	DXK				
Dhanakwada	DKW				
Dhanakya	DNK				
Dhanari	DN				
Dhanawala Wada	DHVR				
Dhanbad Junction	DHN	Jharkhand			
Dhandari Kalan	DDL				
Dhandhera	DNRA				
Dhandhuka	DCK				
Dhanera	DQN	Gujarat			
Dhaneta	DAN				
Dhangadra	DNG	Gujarat			
Dhanmandal	DNM	Odisha			
Dharamtul	DML	Assam	NFR/Northeast Frontier	59 m	
Dharangaon	DXG	Maharashtra			
Dhareshwar	DRS				
Dhari Junction	DARI	Gujarat			
Dhariwal	DHW	Punjab			
Dharmabad	DAB	Maharashtra			
Dharmanagar	DMR	Tripura			
Dharmapuri	DPJ	Tamil Nadu	SWR	466 m	
Dharmavaram Junction	DMM	Andhra Pradesh			
Dharmpur Himachal	DMP	Himachal Pradesh			
Dharnaoda	DHR				
Dharodi	DHY	Haryana		232.00	
Dharwad	DWR	Karnataka		731.52	
Dhasa Junction	DAS				
Dholpur	DHO	Rajasthan	NCR	174 m	
Dhaura	DUA				
Dheena	DHA				
Dhekiajili Road	DKJR				
Dhemaji	DMC	Assam			
Dhenkanal	DNKL	Odisha			
Dhilwan	DIW				
Dhinda	DHND				
Dhindhora HKMKD	DNHK				
Dhindsa	DDK				
Dhing	DIU	Assam	NFR/Northeast Frontier	65 m	
Dhing Bazar	DBZ	Assam	NFR/Northeast Frontier	66 m	
Dhinoj	DHJ				
Dhirera	DHRR				
Dhirganj	DHRJ				
Dhirpur	DPP	Haryana			
Dhoda Khedi	DHKR	Haryana			
Dhodhar	DOD				
Dhodra Mohar	DOH				
Dhola Junction	DLJ	Gujarat			
Dhola Mazra	DHMZ				
Dholi	DOL				
Dholka	DOK				
Dhondi	DNDI				
Dhoraji	DJI				
Dhrangadhra Junction	DHG	Gujarat			
Dhubri	DBB	Assam	NFR/Northeast Frontier	30 m	
Dhule	DHI	Maharashtra			
Dhulghat	DGT	Maharashtra	South Central	408 m	
Dhulkot	DKT	Haryana			
Dhup Dhara	DPRA	Assam	NFR/Northeast Frontier	49 m	
Dhupguri	DQG	West Bengal	NFR/Northeast Frontier	77 m	
Dhuri Junction	DUI	Punjab			
Diamond Harbour	DH	West Bengal	ER/Eastern Railway		
Dibai	DIB	Uttar Pradesh			
Dibrugarh	DBRG	Assam	NFR/Northeast Frontier	108 m	
Dibrugarh Town	DBRT	Assam			
Dichpalli	DHP	Telangana			
Didwana	DIA				
Digaru	DGU	Assam	NFR/Northeast Frontier	58 m	
Digboi	DBY	Assam			
Digha	DGHA	West Bengal	SER/South Eastern		
Dighwara	DGA				
Digod	DXD				
Dihakho	DKE	Assam	NFR/Northeast Frontier	202 m	
Dilawarnagar	DIL				
Dildarnagar Junction	DLN	Uttar Pradesh			
Dimapur	DMV	Nagaland			
Dimow	DM				
Dina Nagar	DNN				
Dinagaon	DIQ				
Dindigul Junction	DG	Tamil Nadu			
Dingwahi	DWI				
Dipa	DIPA				
Diphu	DPU	Assam			
Diplana	DPLN				
Dipori	DIP	Maharashtra			
Deesa	DISA	Gujarat			
Ditokcherra	DTC	Assam	NFR/Northeast Frontier	115 m	
Diva Junction	DIV	Maharashtra	CR/Central		
Divine Nagar	DINR	Kerala			
Diwana	DWNA	Haryana			
Diwankhavati	DWV	Maharashtra			
Diyodar	DEOR				
Dobh Bahali	DBHL				
Dockyard Road	DKRD	Maharashtra	Harbour (CR)		
Doddaballapur	DBU	Karnataka			
Dodbele	DBL				
Dohrighat	DIT				
Doiwala	DWO				
Dolavli	DLV	Maharashtra	CR/Central		
Dombivli	DI	Maharashtra	CR/Central		
Domingarh	DMG	Uttar Pradesh	NER/North Eastern Railway		
Donakonda	DKD	Andhra Pradesh			
Dondaicha	DDE	Maharashtra			
Dongargaon	DGN	Madhya Pradesh			
Dongargarh	DGG	Chhattisgarh			
Donigal	DOG				
Doraha	DOA				
Doravart Chtram	DVR				
Dornakal Junction	DKJ	Telangana			
Dronachalam Junction	DNC	Andhra Pradesh			
Dronagiri	DRG	Maharashtra			
Dubaha	DUBH				
Dubia	DBW				
Duddhinagar	DXN	Uttar Pradesh			
Dudhani	DUD				
Dudhia Khurd	DYK				
Dudhnoi	DDNI	Assam	NFR/Northeast Frontier	50 m	
Dudhwakhara	DKX				
Dudh Sagar railway station	DDS	Goa	SWR	281	
Dudh Sagar Water Falls railway station	DWF	Goa	SWR	274	
Dudia	DUK	Rajasthan			
Dudwindi	DDY				
Duganpur	DUN				
Dugdol	DGQ	Gujarat			
Duggirala	DIG	Andhra Pradesh			
Duhai	DXH	Uttar Pradesh			
Duliajan	DJG	Assam			
Dullabcherra	DLCR	Assam	NFR/Northeast Frontier	42 m	
Dullahapur	DLR				
Dulrasar	DUS				
Dum Dum	DDJ	West Bengal	ER/Eastern Railway		
Dum Dum Cantonment	DDC	West Bengal	ER/Eastern Railway		
Dumariya	DY				
Dumraon	DURE				
Dumka	DMKA	Jharkhand			
Dumuriput	DMRT	Odisha	ECoR / East Coast		
Dundara	DOR	Rajasthan			
Dundlod MKDGRH	DOB				
Dungar Junction	DGJ				
Dungarpur	DNRP	Rajasthan	North Western	274 m	
Duraundha Junction	DDA	Bihar			
Durgauti	DGO				
Durg	DURG	Chhattisgarh			
Durgapur	DGR	West Bengal			
Duttapukur	DTK	West Bengal			
Durgapura	DPA				
Duskheda	DSK				
Duvvada	DVD	Andhra Pradesh			
Dwarka	DWK	Gujarat			
Dwarkaganj	DWJ				

== E ==
List of Indian Railways stations whose names start with 'E'

Station name	Station code	State	Railway zone	Elevation	Map
Errupalem	YP	Telangana	SCR		
Ekambara kuppam	EKM	Andhra Pradesh	SCR/South Central		
Ekangarsarai	EKR				
Ekchari	EKC				
Ekma	EM	Kerala			
Ekma	EKMA	Bihar			
Elamanur	EL				
Elavur	ELR	Tamil Nadu			
Yelamanchili	YLM	Andhra Pradesh	SCR/South Central		
Ellenabad	ENB	Haryana			
Eluru	EE	Andhra Pradesh	SCR/South Central	22 m	
Ennore	ENR	Tamil Nadu	SR/Southern	7 m	
Eraligu	ELL	Assam	NFR/Northeast Frontier	35 m	
Eraniel	ERL	Tamil nadu			
Eravipuram	IRP	Kerala			
Ernakulam Junction	ERS	Kerala			
Ernakulam Town	ERN	Kerala			
Ernakulam Terminus	ERG	Kerala			
Erode Junction	ED	Tamil Nadu			
Etah	ETAH	Uttar Pradesh			
Etawah	ETW	Uttar Pradesh	NCR/North Central Railway		
Ettimadai(Coimbatore)	ETMD	Tamil Nadu			
Etmadpur	ETUE	Uttar Pradesh			
Etakkot	ETK	Kerala			

== F ==
List of Indian Railways stations whose names start with 'F'

Station name	Station code	State	Railway zone	Elevation	Map
Faizabad Junction	FD	Uttar Pradesh			
Faizullapur	FYZ	Uttar Pradesh	NCR/North Central		
Fakhrabad	FKB				
Fakiragram Junction	FKM	Assam	NFR/Northeast Frontier	43 m	
Falakata	FLK	West Bengal			
Falna	FA	Rajasthan			
Farah Town[	FHT	Uttar Pradesh			
Farhedi	FRD				
Faridabad	FDB	Haryana			
Faridabad New Town	FDN	Haryana			
Faridkot	FDK	Punjab			
Farrukhabad	FBD	Uttar Pradesh			
Fateh Singhpura	FSP				
Fatehabad Chandrawatiganj Junction	FTD	Madhya Pradesh	WR/Western Zone	43 m	
Fatehgarh	FGR				
Fatehgarh Sahib	FGSB	Punjab			
Fatehnagar	FAN				
Fatehpur	FTP				
Fatehpur Sikri	FTS	Uttar Pradesh			
Fatehpur Shekhawati	FPS	Rajasthan	NWR/North Western Railway		
Fatuha	FUT	Bihar	ECR/Eastern Central Railway		
Fazalpur	FZL				
Fazilka	FKA	Punjab			
Ferok	FK	Kerala			
Firozabad	FZD	Uttar Pradesh			
Firozpur Cantonment	FZR	Punjab			
Firozpur City	FZP	Punjab			
Forbesganj	FBG	Bihar			
Furkating Junction	FKG	Assam			
Fursatganj	FTG				

== G ==
List of Indian Railways stations whose names start with 'G'

Station name	Station code	State	Railway zone	Division	Elevation	Note
Gachhipura	GCH	Rajasthan	North Western	Jodhpur	364 m	
Gardhrubeswar	GRB	West Bengal	SER	Adra		
Gadag Junction	GDG	Karnataka	South Western	Hubli	654 m	
Gadarwara	GAR	Madhya Pradesh	Western Central	Jabalpur	357 m	
Gadhakda	GKD	Gujarat	Western	Bhavnagar	158 m	
Gadra Road	GDD	Rajasthan	North Western	Jodhpur	149 m	
Gadwal	GWD	Telangana	South Central	Hyderabad		
Gahmar	GMR	Uttar Pradesh				
Gainjahwa	GAW	Uttar Pradesh				
Gainsari Junction	GIR	Uttar Pradesh				
Gaipura	GAE					
Gajraula Junction	GJL	Uttar Pradesh				
Galan	GAA					
Gambhiri Road	GRF					
Ganagapur Road	GUR	Karnataka	Central	Solapur	445 m	
Ganj Dundwara	GWA					
Gannaur	GNU	Haryana				
Gandhi Smarak Road	GUR	Maharashtra	South Central	Nanded	259 m	Gauge Conversion
Gandhidham Junction	GUR	Gujarat	Western	Ahmedabad	11 m	
Gandhigram	GG	Gujarat	Western	Bhavnagar	53 m	
Gandhinagar Jaipur	GADJ	Rajasthan	North Western	Jaipur	424 m	
Gandhinagar Capital	GNC	Gujarat	Western	Ahmedabad	78 m	
Ganeshganj	GAJ					
Gangaganj	GANG					
Gangakher	GNH	Maharashtra				
Gangapur City	GGC	Rajasthan	West Central	Kota	269 m	
Gangarampur	GRMP	West Bengal	Northeast Frontier	Katihar	29 m	
Gangrar	GGR					
Gangsar Jaitu	GJUT	Haryana				
Ganj Basoda	BAQ	Madhya Pradesh	West Central	Bhopal	29 m	
Ganjmuradabad	GJMB					
Gannavaram	GWM	Andhra Pradesh				
Garhi Harsaru Junction	GHH	Haryana	Northern	Delhi	221 m	
Garhi Manikpur	GRMR					
Garhmuktesar	GMS	Uttar Pradesh				
Garhmuktesar BR	GGB	Uttar Pradesh				
Garna Sahib	GNS	Punjab	Northern Railway	Jalandhar		
Garhwa	GHQ	Jharkhand	East Central	Dhanbad	212 m	
Garia	GIA	West Bengal	ER/Eastern Railway			
Garwa Road Junction	GHD	Jharkhand	East Central	Dhanbad	190 m	
Garot	GOH	Madhya Pradesh				
Gaura	GRX					
Gauri Bazar	GB					
Gauri Phanta	GPF	Uttarakhand				
Gauribidanur	GBD	Karnataka				
Gauriganj	GNG	Uttar Pradesh				
Gauripur	GUP	Assam	NFR/Northeast Frontier	32 m		
Gauriyamau	GMU					
Gaushala	GWS					
Gautampura Road	GHD	Madhya Pradesh	Western	Ratlam	497 m	
Gaya Junction	GAYA	Bihar	East Central	Mughalsarai	115 m	
Geratpur	GER	Gujarat	Western	Vadodara	41 m	
Gerita Kolvada	GTKD					
Gevra Road	GAD	Chhattisgarh	South East Central	Bilaspur	299 m	
Gevrai	GOI	Maharashtra	South Central	Nanded	n/a	
Ghaggar	GHG	Punjab	Northern	Ambala	190 m	
Ghagwal	GHGL	Jammu and Kashmir	NR/Northern		373 m	
Ghanauli	GANL					
Ghansoli	GNSL	Maharashtra	Central	Mumbai CR	6 m	Trans-Harbour
Gharaunda	GRA	Haryana				
Ghaso	GSO					
Ghataka Varana	GKB					
Ghatampur	GTM					
Ghatkopar	GC	Maharashtra	Central	Mumbai CR	11 m	
Ghatsila	GTS	Jharkhand				
Ghaziabad Junction	GZB	Uttar Pradesh	Northern	Delhi	217 m	
Ghazipur City	GCT	Uttar Pradesh	North Eastern	Varanasi	74 m	
Ghograpur	GOE	Assam	Northeast Frontier	Rangiya	55 m	
Gholvad	GVD	Maharashtra	Western	Mumbai WR	14 m	
Ghoradongri	GDYA	Madhya Pradesh	Central	Nagpur CR	407 m	
Ghorawadi	GRWD	Maharashtra	Central	Pune	596 m	
Ghorpuri	GPR	Maharashtra	Central	Pune	558 m	
Ghorpuri West	GPRW	Maharashtra	Central	Pune	557 m	
Ghosipura	GOPA					
Ghosunda	GSD					
Ghughuli	GH					
Ghugus	GGS	Maharashtra				
Ghutai	GTI					
Gidarpindi	GOD	Punjab				
Giddalur	GID	Andhra Pradesh				
Giddarbaha	GDB					
Gidhaur	GHR					
Gir Gadhara	GEG	Gujarat	Western	Bhavnagar	77 m	
Gir Hadmatiya	GRHM	Gujarat	Western	Bhavnagar	99 m	
Giridih	GRD	Jharkhand	East Central	Asansol	299 m	
Girwar	GW					
Goalpara Town	GLPT	Assam	Northeast Frontier	Rangiya	49 m	
Godha	GDHA					
Godhra Junction	GDA	Gujarat	Western	Vadodara	122 m	
Gogameri	GAMI					
Gogamukh	GOM					
Gohad Road	GOA					
Gohana	GHNA	Haryana				
Gohpur	GPZ	Assam	Northeast Frontier	Rangiya	83 m	
Gokak Road	GKK	Karnataka	South Western	Hubli	625 m	
Gokarna Road	GOK	Karnataka	Konkan	Karwar	14 m	
Gola Gokarannath	GK	Uttar Pradesh	North Eastern	Lucknow NER	159 m	Gauge Conversion
Golakganj Junction	GKJ	Assam	Northeast Frontier	Alipurduar	31 m	
Golanthra	GTA					
Gole	GOLE					
Golsar	GOZ					
Gomti Nagar	GTNR	Uttar Pradesh	North Eastern	Lucknow NER	119 m	
Gonda Junction	GD	Uttar Pradesh	North Eastern	Lucknow NER	110 m	
Gonda Kachahri	GDK	Uttar Pradesh	North Eastern	Lucknow NER	111 m	
Gonda MG	GNAN	Uttar Pradesh	North Eastern	Lucknow NER	111 m	
Gondal	GDL	Gujarat	Western	Bhavnagar	140 m	
Gondia Junction	G	Maharashtra	South East Central	Nagpur SEC	266 m	
Gondumri	GMI	Maharashtra	South East Central	Nagpur SEC	266 m	
Goneana	GNA					
Gooty Junction	GY	Andhra Pradesh	South Central	Guntakal	370 m	
Gop Jam	GOP					
Gopalganj	GOPG	Uttar Pradesh	North Eastern	Varanasi	72 m	
Gopalpur	GPPR					
Gora Ghuma	GGM					
Gorakhpur Cantonment	GKC	Uttar Pradesh	North Eastern	Lucknow NER	86 m	
Gorakhpur Junction	GKP	Uttar Pradesh	North Eastern	Lucknow NER	84 m	It became the world's longest platform on 8 October 2013.
Goram Ghat	GGO					
Ghorasahan	GRH	Bihar				
Goraul	GRL					
Goraya	GRY					
Goregaon	GMN	Maharashtra	Western	Mumbai WR	14 m	
Goregaon Road Halt	GNO	Maharashtra	Konkan	Ratnagiri	13 m	
Goresuar	GVR					
Goriyan	GIO					
Goshainganj	GGJ	Uttar Pradesh	Northern	Lucknow NR	98 m	
Gossaigaon Hat	GOGH	Assam	Northeast Frontier	Alipurduar	49 m	
Gotan	GOTN					
Gotegaon	GON					
Gothaj	GTE					
Govandi	GV	Maharashtra	Central	Mumbai CR	14 m	Harbour Line
Goverdhan	GDO	Uttar Pradesh				
Govindgarh	GVG					
Govindgarh Malk	GND					
Govindi Marwar	GVMR	Rajasthan				
Govindnagar	GOVR					
Govindpuri	GOY	Uttar Pradesh	North Central	Allahabad	n/a	
Grant Road	GTR	Maharashtra	Western	Mumbai WR	7 m	
Greenways Road	GWYR	Tamil Nadu				
Gudha	GA					
Guindy	GDY	Tamil Nadu				
Gubbi	GBB					
Gudivada Junction	GDV	Andhra Pradesh	South Coast	Vijayawada	13 m	
Gudiyattam	GYM	Tamil Nadu				
Gudur Junction	GDR	Andhra Pradesh	South Central	Vijayawada	19 m	
Guduvancheri	GI	Tamil Nadu				
Gujhandi	GJD					
Gulabhganj	GLG					
Gulabpura	GBP					
Gulaothi	GLH					
Gularbhoj	GUB					
Gulbarga	GR	Karnataka	Central	Solapur	458 m	
Guldhar	GUH	Uttar Pradesh				
Guledagudda Road	GED					
Guler	GULR					
Gulzarbagh	GZH	Bihar	East Central	Danapur	55 m	
Guma	GUMA					
Gumia	GMIA					
Gumman	GMM					
Gummidipundi	GPD	Tamil Nadu				
Gumthal	GTF					
Guna Junction	GUNA	Madhya Pradesh	West Central	Bhopal	477 m	
Gundardehi	GDZ					
Guneru Bamori	GVB					
Guntakal Junction	GTL	Andhra Pradesh	South Central	Guntakal	455 m	
Guntur Junction	GNT	Andhra Pradesh	South Central	Guntur	38 m	
Guptipara	GPA	West Bengal				
Guraru	GRRU					
Gurap	GRAE	West Bengal				
Gurdaspur	GSP	Punjab	Northern	Firozpur	266 m	
Gurgaon	GGN	Haryana	Northern	Delhi	219 m	
Gurhi	GUX					
Guriya	GRI					
Gurla	GQL	Rajasthan				
Gurmura	GMX					
Gurpa	GAP					
Gursahaiganj	GHJ					
Gursar Shnewala	GSW					
Guruvayur	GUV	Kerala	Southern	Thiruvananthapuram	12 m	
Guru Tegh Bahadur Nagar	GTBN	Maharashtra	Central	Mumbai CR	219 m	Harbour Line
Guwahati	GHY	Assam	Northeast Frontier	Lumding	58 m	
Gwalior Junction	GWL	Madhya Pradesh	North Central	Jhansi	213 m	
Gyanpur Road	GGN	Uttar Pradesh	North Eastern	Varanasi	92 m	

== H ==
List of Indian Railways stations whose names start with 'H'

Station name	Station code	State	Railway zone	Elevation	Note
Habaipur	HWX	Assam	Northeast Frontier	11 m	
Rani Kamalapati	HBJ	Madhya Pradesh	West Central	496 m	
Habibwala	HBW	Uttar Pradesh	Northern	239 m	
Habra	HB	West Bengal	Eastern	11 m	
Hadapsar	HDP	Maharashtra	Central	554 m	
Hadmadiya	HRM	Gujarat	Western	83 m	
Hadmatiya Junction	HM	Gujarat	Western	90 m	
Hafizpur	HZR	Uttar Pradesh	Northern	214 m	
Haflong Hill	HFG	Assam	Northeast Frontier	555 m	
Haiaghat	HYT	Bihar	East Central	54 m	
Haibargaon	HBN	Assam	Northeast Frontier	68 m	
Haidergarh	HGH	Uttar Pradesh	Northern	116 m	
Hailakandi	HKD	Assam	Northeast Frontier	28 m	
Hajipur Junction	HJP	Bihar	East Central	55 m	
Hakimpur	HKP	Uttar Pradesh	Northern	204 m	
Haldaur	HLDR	Uttar Pradesh	Northern	236 m	
Haldi Road	HLDD	Uttarakhand	North Eastern	236 m	
Haldia	HLZ	West Bengal	SER/South Eastern		
Haldibari	HDB	West Bengal	NFR/Northeast Frontier	75 m	
Haldwani	HDW	Uttarakhand	North Eastern	443 m	
Halisahar	HLR	West Bengal	Eastern	16 m	
Halvad	HVD	Gujarat	Western	45 m	
Hamira	HMR	Punjab	Northern	45 m	
Hamirgarh	HMG	Rajasthan	North Western	416 m	
Hamirpur Road	HAR	Uttar Pradesh	North Central	124 m	
Hamre	HME	Jammu and Kashmir	NR/Northern	1579 m	
Hanakere	HNK	Karnataka	South Western	664 m	
Handia Khas	HDK	Uttar Pradesh	North Eastern	96 m	
Hansi Junction	HNS	Haryana	North Western (NWR)	218 m	
Hansiawas	HSWS	Rajasthan	North Western	209 m	
Hanumangarh Junction	HMH	Rajasthan	North Western	184 m	
Hanumangarh Town	HMO	Rajasthan	North Western	183 m	
Hanwant	HWT	Rajasthan	North Western	185 m	
Hapa	HAPA	Gujarat	Western	15 m	
Hapa Road	HPRD	Gujarat	Western	139 m	
Hapur Junction	HPU	Uttar Pradesh	Northern	216 m	
Harangajao	HJO	Assam	Northeast Frontier	154 m	
Harangul	HGL	Maharashtra	Central	644 m	
Haranya Kheri	HKH	Madhya Pradesh	Western	567 m	
Harauni	HRN	Uttar Pradesh	Northern	129 m	
Harwada	HAA	Karnataka	Konkan	7 m	
Harchandpur	HCP	Uttar Pradesh	Northern	121 m	
Harda	HD	Madhya Pradesh	West Central	289 m	
Hardoi	HRI	Uttar Pradesh	Northern	145 m	
Harduaganj	HGJ	Uttar Pradesh	Northern	188 m	
Haridwar	HW	Uttarakhand	Northern	294 m	
Harihar	HRR	Karnataka	South Western	553 m	
Harinagar	HIR	Bihar	East Central	97 m	
Haripad	HAD	Kerala	Southern	9 m	
Haripur	HP	Rajasthan	North Western	345 m	
Haripur Gram	HPGM	Odisha	East Coast	21 m	
Harischandrapur	HCR	West Bengal	Northeast Frontier	31 m	
Harishanker Road	HSK	Odisha	East Coast	337 m	
Harisinga	HRSN	Assam	Northeast Frontier	97 m	
Harkia Khal	HKL	Madhya Pradesh	Western	476 m	
Harmuti	HMY	Assam	Northeast Frontier	99 m	
Harnaut	HRT	Bihar	East Central	49 m	
Harpalganj	HRPG	Uttar Pradesh	Northern	92 m	
Harpalpur	HPP	Madhya Pradesh	North central		
Harrawala	HRW	Uttarakhand	Northern	596 m	
Harsauli	HSI	Rajasthan	North Western	287 m	
Harsud	HRD	Madhya Pradesh	West Central	00 m	Defunct railway station
Harthala	HRH	Uttar Pradesh	Northern	206 m	
Harwada	HAA	Karnataka	Konkan	7 m	
Hasimara	HSA	West Bengal	Northeast Frontier	123 m	
Hassan Junction	HAS	Karnataka	South Western	951 m	
Hasanparthi Road	HSP	Telangana	South Central	261 m	
Hathbandh	HN	Chhattisgarh	South East Central	283 m	
Hathidah Junction	HTZ	Bihar	East Central	50 m	
Hathigadh	HTGR	Gujarat	Western	105 m	
Hathras City	HTC	Uttar Pradesh	North Eastern	178 m	
Hathras Junction	HRS	Uttar Pradesh	North Central	183 m	
Hathras Road	HTJ	Uttar Pradesh	North Eastern	183 m	
Hathras Qilla	HRF	Uttar Pradesh	North Central	181 m	
Hatia	HTE	Jharkhand	South Eastern	665 m	
Hatikhali	HTE	Assam	Northeast Frontier	289 m	
Hatkanagale	HTK	Maharashtra	Central	591 m	
Hatundi	HTD	Rajasthan	North Western	482 m	
Haveri	HVR	Karnataka	South Western	558 m	
Hazaribagh Road	HZD	Jharkhand	East Central	331 m	
Hazrat Nizamuddin	NZM	Delhi	Northern	210 m	
Heelalige	HLE	Karnataka	South Western	884 m	
Hejjala	HZD	Karnataka	South Western	773 m	
Helak	HK	Rajasthan	North Central	183 m	
Helem	HML	Assam	Northeast Frontier	90 m	
Hempur	HMP	Uttar Pradesh	Northern	149 m	
Hendegir	HNDR	Jharkhand	East Central	398 m	
Hilara	HLX	Assam	Northeast Frontier	24 m	
Hiller Shahabad	HRSB	Jammu and Kashmir	NR/Northern	1753 m	
Hilsa	HIL	Bihar	East Central	58 m	
Himayatnagar	HEM	Maharashtra	South Central	404 m	
Himmatnagar Junction	HMT	Gujarat	Western	142 m	
Hindaun City	HAN	Rajasthan	West Central	228 m	
Hind Motor	HMZ	West Bengal	Eastern	9 m	
Hindu College	HC	Tamil Nadu	Southern	28 m	
Hindumalkote	HMK	Rajasthan	Southern	181 m	
Hindupur	HUP	Andhra Pradesh	South Western	635 m	
Hinganghat	HGT	Maharashtra	Central	229 m	
Hingoli Deccan	HNL	Maharashtra	Central	466 m	
Hira Nagar	HRNR	Jammu and Kashmir	NR/Northern	381 m	
Hirakud	HKG	Odisha	East Coast	169 m	
Hirapur	HNL	Maharashtra	Central	373 m	
Hirdagarh	HRG	Maharashtra	Central	721 m	
Hirnoda	HDA	Rajasthan	North Western	398 m	
Hisar	HSR	Haryana	North Western	212 m	
Hisvahal	HSL	Maharashtra	Central	541 m	
Hodal	HDL	Haryana	North Central	190 m	
Hojai	HJI	Assam	Northeast Frontier	78 m	
Hol	HOL	Maharashtra	Western	185 m	
Holambi Kalan	HUK	Delhi	Northern Railways	223 m	
Hole Alur	HLAR	Karnataka	South Western	543 m	
Honnavar	HNA	Karnataka	Konkan	4& m	
Hooghly	HGY	West Bengal	Eastern	14 m	
Hooghly Ghat	HYG	West Bengal	Eastern	15 m	
Homnabad	HMBD	Karnataka	South Central	14 m	
Hosdurga Road	HSD	Karnataka	South Western	735 m	
Narmadapuram	HBD	Madhya Pradesh	West Central	309 m	
Hoshiarpur	HSX	Punjab	Northern	300 m	
Hosapete Junction	HPT	Karnataka	South Western	471 m	
Hosur	HSRA	Tamil Nadu	South Western	896 m	
Hotgi Junction	HG	Maharashtra	Central	473 m	
Howbagh Jabalpur	HBG	Madhya Pradesh	South East Central	404 m	
Howrah Junction	HWH	West Bengal	Eastern	10 m	Largest Station in India
Hubballi Junction	UBL	Karnataka	South Western	640 m	Headquarters of South Western Railway zone
Hugrajuli	HJLI	Assam	Northeast Frontier	115 m	
Husainpur	HSQ	Punjab	Northern	224 m	
Hyderabad Deccan	HYB	Telangana	South Central	509 m	

== I ==
List of Indian Railways stations whose names start with 'I'

Station name	Station code	State	Railway zone	Elevation	Map
Ib	IB	Odisha	SECR/Bilaspur	203 m	
Ichhapur	IP	West Bengal	ER/Sealdah	11 m	
Ichapuram	IGP	Andhra Pradesh			
Ichauli	ICL				
Idar	IDAR	Gujarat	WR/Ahmedabad	220 m	
Idgah Agra Junction	IDH	Uttar Pradesh	NCR		
Igatpuri	IGP	Maharashtra			
Ikkar	IKK				
Iklehra	IKR				
Inchhapuri	IHP	Haryana			
Indalvai	IDL				
Indapur	INP	Maharashtra	KR/Konkan Railway	20 m	
Indara Junction	IAA	Uttar Pradesh			
Indargarh	IDG	Rajasthan			
Indira Nagar	IMR	Tamil Nadu			
Indore Junction (BG)	INDB	Madhya Pradesh			
Indore Junction (MG)	INDM	Madhya Pradesh			
Innanje	INJ	Karnataka	KRCL		
Intikanne					
Intiyathok	ITE				
Itehar	AAH	Madhya Pradesh			
Iqbal Gadh	IQG				
Iqbalpur	IQB				
Irinjalakuda	IJK	Kerala			
Irugur	IGU	Tamil Nadu			
Isarda	ISA				
Islampur	IPR	Bihar			
Ismaila Haryana	ISM	Haryana			
Itarsi Junction	ET	Madhya Pradesh			
Itola	ITA				
Itwari	ITR	Maharashtra	SECR/Nagpur	305 m	
Izzatnagar	IZN	Uttar Pradesh	NER/Izzatnagar	180 m	

== J ==
List of Indian Railways stations whose names start with 'J'

Station name	Station code	State	Railway zone	Elevation	Map
Jabalpur	JBP	Madhya Pradesh	West central	417 m	
Jabli	JBL				
Jabri	JBX				
Jadar	JADR				
Jadavpur	JDP	West Bengal	ER/Eastern Railway		
Jadcherla	JCL	Telangana			
Jagadhri	JUD	Haryana			
Jagadhri Workshop	JUDW	Haryana			
Jagadishpur	JGD				
Jagaddal	JDL	West Bengal			
Jessore Road	JSOR	West Bengal			
Jagatbela	JTB				
Jagdalpur	JDB	Chhattisgarh	ECoR / East Coast		
Jagdevwala	JDL				
Jagesharganj	JGJ				
Jagi road	JID	Assam	NFR/Northeast Frontier	62 m	
Jagnath Road Halt	JNX	Rajasthan			
Jagraon	JGN	Punjab			
Jahanikhera	JKH				
Jaipur	JP	Rajasthan	North Western	434m	
Jais	JAIS	Uttar Pradesh			
Jaisalmer	JSM	Rajasthan	224 m		
Jaithari	JTI				
Jaitipur	JTU				
Jaitwar	JTW				
Jajiwal	JWL				
Jajpur Kheonjhar Road	JJKR	Odisha			
Jakhal Junction	JHL	Haryana			
Jakhalabandha	JKB	Assam	NFR/Northeast Frontier	73 m	
Jakhalaun	JLN				
Jakhania	JKN	Uttar Pradesh			
Jakhaura	JHA				
Jakhim	JHN				
Jakhvada	JKA				
Jaksi	JKS				
Jalalganj	JLL				
Jalalpur Dhai	JPD				
Jalamb Junction	JM	Maharashtra			
Jalandhar Cantonment	JRC	Punjab			
Jalandhar City	JUC	Punjab	238 m		
Jalesar Road	JLS	Uttar Pradesh			
Jaleswar	JER	Odisha	13 m		
Jalgaon Junction	JL	Maharashtra	213 m		
Jalila Road	JIL				
Jaliya Devani	JALD				
Jalna	J	Maharashtra			
Jalor	JOR	Rajasthan			
Jalpaiguri	JPG	West Bengal	84 m		
Jalpaiguri Road	JPE	West Bengal			
Jalsu	JAC				
Jalsu Nanak	JACN				
Jam Jodhpur Junction	JDH	Rajasthan			
Jam Wanthali	WTJ				
Jamalpur Junction	JMP	Bihar	59 m		
Jambara	JMV				
Jambur	JBB				
Jamira	JMRA	Assam	NFR/Northeast Frontier	51 m	
Jammalamadugu	JMDG	Andhra Pradesh			
Jammikunta	JMKT	Telangana			
Jammu Tawi	JAT	Jammu & Kashmir	NR/Northern	343 m	
Jamnagar	JAM	Gujarat			
Jamsar	JMS				
Jamtara	JMT	Jharkhand	ER/Eastern Railway		
Jamui	JMU	Bihar	66 m		
Jamunamukh	JMK	Assam	NFR/Northeast Frontier	70 m	
Jamwala	JVL				
Janakpur Road	JNR	Bihar	ECR		
Jandiala	JNL				
Jangaon	ZN	Telangana	SCR	380 m	
Janghai Junction	JNH	Uttar Pradesh	92 m		
Jangipur Road	JRLE	West Bengal	34 m		
Janiyana	JNE				
Jankampet Junction	JKM				
Jaora	JAO				
Japla	JPL				
Jarandeshwar	JSV				
Jargaon	JRJ				
Jari	JARI	Gujarat			
Jaruda Naraa					
Jarwal Road	JLD				
Jasia	JSA	Haryana			
Jasali	JSI				
Jasidih Junction	JSME	Jharkhand	271 m		
Jasra	JSR				
Jaswantgarh	JSH				
Jaswantnagar railway station	JGR				
Jataula Samphka	JSKA	Haryana			
Jath Road	JTRD				
Jatinga	JTG	Assam	NFR/Northeast Frontier	298 m	
Jatusana	JTS	Haryana			
Jaulka	JUK				
Jaunpur City railway station	JOP	Uttar Pradesh	NR/Northern Railways	87 m	
Jaunpur Junction	JNU	Uttar Pradesh	NR/Northern Railways	83 m	
Javale	JVA				
Jawad Road	JWO	Madhya Pradesh			
Jawai Bandh	JWB				
Jawali	JAL	Rajasthan			
Jawalamukhi Road	JMKR	Himachal Pradesh	598 m		
Jayasingpur	JSP				
Jaynagar	JYG	Bihar			
Jaynagar Majilpur	JNM	West Bengal	ER/Eastern Railway	8 m (26 ft)	
Jehanabad	JHD	Bihar			
Jejuri	JJR				
Jenal	JNZ	Gujarat			
Jeonathpur	JEP				
Jetalsar Junction	JLR	Gujarat			
Jetalvad	JTV				
Jetpur	JTP	Gujarat			
Jeur	JEUR	Maharashtra			
Jagannath Temple Gate	JGE	Odisha			
Jhadupudi	JPI	Andhra Pradesh			
Jhagadiya Junction	JGI				
Jhajha	JAJ	Bihar	142 m		
Jhalawar Road	JHW	Rajasthan			
Jhalida	JAA	West Bengal			
Jhanjharpur	JJP	Bihar			
Jhansi Junction	JHS	Uttar Pradesh	North Central Railway		
Jhargram	JGM	West Bengal			
Jharia	JRI	Jharkhand			
Jharokhas	JRQ				
Jharsuguda Junction	JSG	Odisha			
Jharwasaa	JWS				
Jhingura	JHG				
Jhinjhak	JJK	Uttar Pradesh	NCR/North Central Railway	131 m	
Jhunjhunu	JJN	Rajasthan			
Jhunpa	JUP				
Jigna	JIA				
Jind Junction	JIND	Haryana			
Jira Road	JIR				
Jiradei	ZRD				
Jiribam	JRBM	Manipur	NFR/Northeast Frontier	46 m	
Jirighat	JIGT	Assam	NFR/Northeast Frontier	42 m	
Jiron	JRO				
Jiyapuram	JPM	Tamil Nadu			
Jodhpur Junction	JU	Rajasthan			
Jogbani	JBN	Bihar			
Jogeshwari	JOS	Maharashtra	WR/Western		
Jogi Magra	JOM				
Jogidih	JGF				
Jogighopa	JPZ	Assam	NFR/Northeast Frontier	41 m	
Joginder Nagar railway station	JDNX	Himachal Pradesh			
Jogiwala	JGW				
Jolarpettai Junction	JTJ	Tamil Nadu			
Jone Karrang	JYK				
Joravaragar	JVN	Gujarat			
Jorhat	JT	Assam			
Jorhat Town	JTTN	Assam			
Jotana	JTN				
Joychandi Pahar railway station	JOC	West Bengal	JOC	SER	
Juchandra		Maharashtra	CR/Central		
Jugijan	JGJN	Assam	NFR/Northeast Frontier	73 m	
Juinagar		Maharashtra	Harbour/Trans-Harbour (CR)		
Jukehi	JKE				
Julana	JNA	Haryana			
Junagadh C B	JNDC	Gujarat			
Junagadh Junction	JND	Gujarat	WR/Western	86 m	
Jung Bahadurganj	JBG				
Junichavand	JCN				
Junnor Deo	JNO				
Juriagaon	JRX	Assam	NFR/Northeast Frontier	68 m	
Jutogh	JTO	Himachal Pradesh			
Jwalapur	JWP				
Juinagar	JNJ	Maharashtra	Central Railway		
Jung Bahadurganj	jbg	Uttar Pradesh	Northern Railway	152 m	

== K ==
List of Indian Railways stations whose names start with 'K'

Station name	Station code	State	Railway zone	Elevation	Map
Kabaka Puttur railway station	KBPR	Karnataka	South Western Railway		
Kacheguda	KCG	Telangana	SCR/South Central		
Kachhwa Road	KWH				
Kondapalli	KI	Andhra Pradesh	South Coast Railway zone		
Kadalundi	KN	Kerala			
Kadambur	KDU	Tamil Nadu			
Kadayanallur	KDNL	Tamil Nadu			
Kadiri	KRY	Andhra Pradesh			
Kadur Junction	DRU	Karnataka	SWR/South Western Railway		
Kaithal	KLE	Haryana	NR/Northern Railway	237 m	
Kaithalkuchi	KTCH	Assam	NFR/Northeast Frontier	50 m	
Kajgaon	KJ	Maharashtra	CR	297m	
Kakapora	KAPE	Jammu and Kashmir	NR/Northern	1588 m	
Kakinada Port	COA	Andhra Pradesh			
Kakinada Town	CCT	Andhra Pradesh			
Kankinara	KNR	West Bengal			
Kalachand	KQI	Assam	NFR/Northeast Frontier	267 m	
Kalamboli	KLMC	Maharashtra	CR/Central		
Kalanaur kalan	KLNK	Haryana			
Kalem railway station	KM	Goa	SWR	55	
Kalianpur	KAP	Uttar Pradesh			
Kalka	KLK	Haryana	656 m		
Kalkalighat	KKGT	Assam	NFR/Northeast Frontier	31 m	
Kalwa	KLVA	Maharashtra	CR/Central		
Kalwan	KLWN	Haryana	NR/Northern		
Kalyan Junction	KYN	Maharashtra	CR/Central		
Kondapalli railway station	KI	Andhra Pradesh	SCoR		
Kanchrapara	KPA	West Bengal			
Kalyani	KLY	West Bengal			
Kalyanadurg	KYND	Andhra Pradesh	SWR/ South Western Railway		
Kalinarayanpur Junction	KLNP	West Bengal			
Kalol Junction	KLL	Gujarat			
Kaman Road		Maharashtra	CR/Central		
Kamareddi	KMC	Telangana			
Kampil Road	KXF	Uttar Pradesh			
Kamshet	KMST	Maharashtra			
Kamakhya Junction	KYQ	Assam	NFR/Northeast Frontier	55 m	
Kampur	KWM	Assam	NFR/Northeast Frontier	68 m	
Kamrup Khetri	KKET	Assam	NFR/Northeast Frontier	56 m	
Kanaibazar	KNBR	Assam	NFR/Northeast Frontier	27 m	
Kanakpura	KKU	Rajasthan	North Western Railway	429 m	
Kanchausi	kan	Uttar Pradesh	NCR/North Central Railway		
Kanchipuram	CJ	Tamil Nadu			
Kanchipuram East	CJE	Tamil Nadu			
Kandivli	KILE	Maharashtra	WR/Western		
Kangra	KGRA	Himachal Pradesh			
Kanhangad	KZE	Kerala			
Kanina Khas	KNNK	Haryana			
Kaniyapuram	KXP	Kerala			
Kanjiramittam	KPTM	Kerala			
Kanjurmarg	KJMG	Maharashtra	CR/Central		
Kankanadi	KNKD	Karnataka			
Kannauj	KJN	Uttar Pradesh			
Kannur	CAN	Kerala	Southern Railway	16 m (52 ft)	
Kanpur Anwarganj	CPA	Uttar Pradesh			
Kanpur Central	CNB	Uttar Pradesh	NCR/North Central Railway		
Kanpur Rooma	RMX	Uttar Pradesh			
Kanpur SMU CBSA CPSM	CPSM	Uttar Pradesh			
Kanpur Govindpuri railway station	GOY	Uttar Pradesh	NCR/North Central Railway		
Kanpur Panki	PNK	Uttar Pradesh	NCR/North Central Railway		
Kanpur Bridge Left Bank	CPB	Uttar Pradesh			
Kanyakumari	CAPE	Tamil Nadu			
Kapurthala	KXH	Punjab			
Karad	KRD	Maharashtra	Central Railway	596 m	
Karaikal	KIK	Puducherry	SR/Southern Railway		
Karaikkudi Junction	KKDI	Tamil Nadu			
Karanja	KRJA	Maharashtra			
Karchha	KDHA	Madhya Pradesh	Western Railway	514 m	
Karimganj Junction	KXJ	Assam	Northeast Frontier Railway	23 m	
Karimnagar	KRMR	Telangana	SCR/South Central		
Karjat	S	Maharashtra	CR/Central		
Karmali	KRMI	Goa	KRCL	6 m	
Karnal	KUN	Haryana	NR / Northern	235 m	
Karur Junction	KRR	Tamil Nadu			
Karunagappalli	KPY	Kerala	SR/Southern		
Karwar	KAWR	Karnataka	Konkan Railway	11 m	
Kasara	N	Maharashtra	CR/Central		
Kasaragod	KGQ	Kerala			
Kashi	KEI	Uttar Pradesh			
Kashipur Junction	KPV	Uttarakhand	North Eastern Railway	237 m	
Kasturba Nagar	KTBR	Tamil Nadu			
Katakhal Junction	KTX	Assam	NFR/Northeast Frontier	20 m	
Kathgodam	KGM	Uttarakhand	North Eastern Railway	520 m	
Kathivakkam	KAVM	Tamil Nadu	SR/Southern Railway	9 m	
Kathua	KTHU	Jammu and Kashmir	Northern Railways	393 m	
Katihar	KIR	Bihar			
Katlicherra	KLCR	Assam	NFR/Northeast Frontier	45 m	
Katni	KTE	Madhya Pradesh			
Katol	KATL	Maharashtra			
Katpadi Junction, Vellore	KPD	Tamil Nadu	SR/Southern Railway		
Katra	KEA	Uttar Pradesh			
Kattankulathur	CTM	Tamil Nadu			
Kavali	KVZ	Andhra Pradesh			
Kavaraipettai	KVP	Tamil Nadu			
Kayamkulam	KYJ	Kerala			
Kayalpattinam	KZY	Tamil Nadu			
Kayasthagram	KTGM	Assam	NFR/Northeast Frontier	25 m	
Kazhakoottam TechnoPark Trivandrum	KZK	Kerala			
Kazipet Junction	KZJ	Telangana			
Kelavli		Maharashtra	CR/Central		
Kelve Road	KLV	Maharashtra	WR/Western		
Kempegowda International Airport Bengaluru	KIA	Karnataka	SB/Suburban		
Kendukana	KDKN	Assam	NFR/Northeast Frontier	52 m	
Kengeri	KGI	Karnataka	South Western Railway	804 m	
Kerakat railway station	KCT	Uttar Pradesh	North Eastern Railway	80 m	
Kesinga	KSNG	Odisha	East Coast		
Kesamudram	KDM	Telangana	South Central Railway		
Kevadia	KDCY	Gujarat	WR		
Khadavli	KDV	Maharashtra	CR/Central		
Khadki	KK	Maharashtra			
Khairthal	KRH	Rajasthan			
Khajuraho	KURJ	Madhya Pradesh			
Khalilpur	KIP	Haryana			
Khambhaliya	KMBL	Gujarat			
Khamgaon	KMN	Maharashtra			
Khamkhed	KMN	Maharashtra			
Khammam	KMT	Telangana	South Central Railway		This is the Most Revenue Generated Station in the zone
Khana Junction	KAN	West Bengal			
Khandala	KAD	Maharashtra			
Khandeshwar		Maharashtra	Harbour (CR)		
Khandwa	KNW	Madhya Pradesh			
Khanna	KNN	Punjab			
Kharagpur Junction	KGP	West Bengal		1220 m	
Kharbao		Maharashtra	CR/Central		
Khardi	KE	Maharashtra	CR/Central		
Kharghar		Maharashtra	Harbour (CR)		
Kharkopar		Maharashtra	Harbour (CR)		
Khar Road	KHAR	Maharashtra	WR/Western/Harbour (CR)		
Khatauli	KAT	Uttar Pradesh			
Khatu	KHTU	Rajasthan			
Khed	KHED	Maharashtra			
Khera Kalan	KHKN	Delhi	Northern Railways	215 m	
Khopoli	KP	Maharashtra	CR/Central		
Khurai	KYE	Madhya Pradesh			
Kilambakkam		Tamil Nadu	SR/Southern Railway		
Kilikolloor	KLQ	Kerala			
King's Circle	KCE	Maharashtra	Harbour (CR)		
Kinwat	KNVT	Maharashtra			
Kirakat railway station	KCT	Uttar Pradesh	NER/North Eastern Railway		
Kirloskarwadi	KOV	Maharashtra			
Kirnahar	KNHR	West Bengal			
Kishanganj	KNE	Bihar	NFR		
Kiul Junction	KIUL	Bihar			
Kochuveli (Trivandrum /Thiruvananthapuram)	KCVL	Kerala			
Kodaikanal road	KQN	Tamil Nadu			
Kodambakkam	MKK	Tamil Nadu	SR/Southern Railway		
Koderma	KQR	Jharkhand			
Kodinar	KODR	Gujarat	WR/Western	15 m	
Kodumudi	KMD	Tamil Nadu			
Koduru	KOU	Andhra Pradesh			
Kokrajhar	KOJ	Assam	NFR/Northeast Frontier	46 m	
Kolar	KQZ	Karnataka			
Kollidam	CLN	Tamil Nadu	SR/Southern Railway		
Kolhapur	KOP	Maharashtra			
Kolad	KOL	Maharashtra	KR / Konkan Railway	17 m	
Kolkata railway station	KOAA	West Bengal			
Kollam Junction	QLN	Kerala	SR/Southern		
Konnagar	KOG	West Bengal			
Kopar		Maharashtra	CR/Central		
Kopargaon	KPG	Maharashtra	Central Railways	508 m	
Kopar Khairane	KPHN	Maharashtra	Trans-Harbour (CR)		
Koraput Junction	KRPU	Odisha	East Coast/ ECoR		
Koratla railway station	KRLA	Telangana	SCR/ South Central Railway zone	296 m	
Korattiangadi		Kerala			
Korattur	KOTR	Tamil Nadu	SR/Southern Railway	12.85 m	
Korba	KRBA	Chhattisgarh			
Koregaon	KRG	Maharashtra	CR/Central	658 m	
Korukkupet	KOK	Tamil Nadu	SR/Southern	7 m	
Kosamba	KSB	Gujarat			
Kosi Kalan	KSV	Uttar Pradesh			
Kosli	KSI	Haryana			
Kotdwar	KTW	Uttarakhand			
Kotkapura Junction	KKP	Punjab	NR/Northern		
Kota Junction	KOTA	Rajasthan	WCR/Western Central Railway		
Kotli Kalan	KTKL	Punjab			
Kotma	KTMA	Madhya Pradesh	517 m		Map
Kotshila Junction	KSX	West Bengal			
Kottapalli	KYOP	Telangana			
Kottavalasa	KTV	Andhra Pradesh			
Kottayam	KTYM	Kerala			
Kottarakkara	KTR	Kerala			
Kotikulam	KQK	Kerala	Southern Railways		
Kottupuram	KTPM	Tamil Nadu	Southern Railways		
Kotturu	KTY	Andhra Pradesh			
Kovilpatti	CVP	Tamil Nadu			
Koyilandy	QLD	Kerala			
Kozhikode	CLT	Kerala			
Krishna		Andhra Pradesh			
Krishna Canal	KCC	Andhra Pradesh			
Krishnai	KRNI	Assam	NFR/Northeast Frontier	44 m	
Krishnadevaraya Halt	KNDV	Karnataka	South Western Railway		
Krishnarajapuram	KJM	Karnataka			
Kuchaman City	KMNC	Rajasthan			
Kudal	KUDL	Maharashtra	KR / Konkan Railway Corporation	26 m	
Kudchade railway station	SVM	Goa	SWR	12	
Kulem railway station	QLM	Goa	SWR	77	
Kulitalai	KLT	Tamil Nadu			
Kulpahar	KLAR	Uttar Pradesh			
Kulti	ULT	West Bengal			
Kulukkallur		Kerala	Southern Railways		
Kumgaon Burti	KJL	Maharashtra			
Kumbakonam	KMU	Tamil Nadu			
Kumrabad Rohini	KBQ	Jharkhand	Eastern Railways	253	
Kumta	KT	Karnataka	KRCL		
Kundapura	KUDA	Karnataka			
Kuppam	KPN	Andhra Pradesh			
Kuram	KUM	Maharashtra			
Kuri	KFI	Kerala			
Kurichedu	KCD	Andhra Pradesh			
Kurduvadi	KWV	Maharashtra			
Kurla	CLA	Maharashtra	CR/Central/Harbour		
Kurnool Town	KRNT	Andhra Pradesh			
Kurukshetra Junction	KKDE	Haryana			
Kuttippuram	KTU	Kerala			
Khurda Road	KUR	Odisha			
Kursela	KUE	bihar			

== L ==
List of Indian Railways stations whose names start with 'L'

Station name	Station code	State	Railway zone	Elevation	Map
Laban	LBN				
Labha	LAV				
Labhpur	LAB	West Bengal			
Lachhipura	LAC				
Lachhmangarh SK	LNH				
Lachhmanpur	LMN				
Lachyan	LHN				
Ladhowal	LDW	Punjab			
Ladnun	LAU				
Laheria Sarai	LSI	Bihar			
Lahli	LHLL	Haryana			
Laimekuri	LMY				
Lakadiya	LKZ				
Lakheri	LKE				
Lakhimpur	LMP	Uttar Pradesh	North Eastern Railway		
Lakhminia	LKN				
Lakhnauria	LNQ				
Lakhtar	LTR				
Lakkidi	LDY	Kerala			
Laksar Junction	LRJ	Uttarakhand			
Lakshmibai Nagar	LMNR				
Lal Kuan	LKU	Uttarakhand			
Lalabazar	LLBR	Assam	NFR/Northeast Frontier	32 m	
Lalapet	LP				
Lalganj	LLJ	Uttar Pradesh			
Lalgarh Junction	LGH	Rajasthan	North Western Railway	225 m	
Lalgopalganj	LGO				
Lalgudi	LLI				
Lalitpur	LAR	Uttar Pradesh			
Lalkuan Junction	LKU	Uttarakhand	North Eastern Railways	443 m	
Lalpur	LLR				
Lalpur Chandra	LCN				
Lalpur Jam	LPJ				
Lalpur Umri	LRU				
Lalru	LLU	Punjab			
Lamana	LNA				
Lambhua	LBA				
Lambiya	LMA				
Lamsakhang	LKG	Assam	NFR/Northeast Frontier	106 m	
Landaura	LDR				
Langting	LGT	Assam	NFR/Northeast Frontier	147 m	
Lanka	LKA	Assam	NFR/Northeast Frontier	89 m	
Laopani	LPN	Assam	NFR/Northeast Frontier	63 m	
Lar Road	LRD				
Lasalgaon	LS	Maharashtra			
Lasur	LSR				
Latehar	LTHR	Jharkhand	East Central Railway	381 m	
Lathi	LAT	Gujarat			
Latur	LUR	Maharashtra	CR/Central Railways	622 m	
Latur Road Junction	LTRR	Maharashtra	SCR/South Central Railways	650 m	
Laukaha Bazar	LKQ				
Laul	LAUL				
Lawa Sardargarh	LSG				
Ledarmer	LDM	Rajasthan			
Lehra Gaga	LHA				
Lidhora Khurd	LDA				
Light House	MLHS	Tamil Nadu			
Liliya Mota	LMO				
Limbdi	LM	Gujarat			
Limkheda	LMK				
Linch	LCH	Gujarat	Western Railway		
Lingampalli	LPI	Telangana			
Liluah	LLH				
Lodipur Bishnpr	LDP				
Loha	LOHA				
Loharu	LHU	Haryana			
Loharwara	LHW				
Lohian Khas Junction	LNK	Punjab			
Lohna Road	LNO	Bihar			
Lohogad	LHD				
Loisingha	LSX	Odisha			
Lokmanya Tilak Terminus	LTT	Maharashtra	CR/Central		
Loliem railway station	LOL	Goa	KRCL	27	
Lonand	LNN				
Lonavala	LNL	Maharashtra			
Londa Junction	LD	Karnataka			
Loni	LONI	Maharashtra			
Lorwada	LW				
Lower Haflong	LFG	Assam	NFR/Northeast Frontier	479 m	
Lower Parel	PL	Maharashtra	WR/Western		
Lowjee	LWJ	Maharashtra	CR/Central		
Luckeesarai Junction	LKR	Bihar			
Lucknow Junction	LJN	Uttar Pradesh			
Lucknow	LKO	Uttar Pradesh			
Lucknow City	LC	Uttar Pradesh			
Ludhiana Junction	LDH	Punjab			
Lumding Junction	LMG	Assam	NFR/Northeast Frontier	142 m	
Lunavada	LNV	Gujarat			
Luni Junction	LUNI	Rajasthan			
Luni Richha	LNR				
Lunidhar	LDU				
Lunkaransar	LKS	Rajasthan			
Lusa	LUSA				
Lusadiya	LSD				
Lushala	LAL				
Lalgola	LGL	West Bengal	ER		

== M ==
List of Indian Railways stations whose names start with 'M'

Station name	Station code	State	Railway zone	Elevation	Map	
Macharya	MCV					
Machavaram	AMIN	Telangana				
Machavaram	MCVM	Andhra Pradesh				
Machelipatnam	MTM	Andhra Pradesh	South Central Railway Zone			
Macherla	MCLA	Andhra Pradesh				
Madankata	MNC	Jharkhand				
Madan Mahal	MML	Madhya Pradesh				
Madanapalle Rd	MPL	Andhra Pradesh				
Madanpur	MDR					
Madathukulam	MDKM	Tamil Nadu				
Maddur	MAD	Karnataka				
Madhavnagar	MDVR	Maharashtra				
Madukarai(Coimbatore)	MDKI	Tamil Nadu				
Madgaon Junction railway station	MAO	Goa	SWR KRCL	8.852		
Majorda Junction railway station	MJO	Goa	SWR KRCL	108		
Marmagao railway station	MRH	Goa	SWR	7		
Mithlanchal Deep	Madhubani	Bihar				
Madha	MA	Maharashtra				
Madhabpur	MDBP					
Madhapar	MDHP					
Madhapur Road	MADP					
Madhi	MID					
Madhira	MDR	Telangana				
Madhopur Punjab	MDPB	Punjab				
Madhorajpur	MQH					
Madhosingh	MBS					
Madhubani	MBI	Bihar				
Madhupur Junction	MDP	Jharkhand	Eastern Railway Zone			
Madurai Junction	MDU	Tamil Nadu				
Madurantakam	MMK	Tamil Nadu				
Madure	MADR					
Maghar	MHH					
Mahadanapuram	MMH					
Mahadevpara	MHDP					
Mahajan	MHJ					
Mahalam	MFM					
Mahalaxmi	MX	Maharashtra	WR/Western			
Mahamandir	MMC					
Mahansar	MWR					
Mahasamund	MSMD	Chhattisgarh				
Mahbubabad	MABD	Telangana				
Mahbubnagar	MBNR	Telangana				
Mahe	MAHE	Puducherry				
Maheji	MYJ					
Mahendragarh	MHRG	Haryana				
Mahes Khunt	MSK					
Mahesana Junction	MSH	Gujarat				
Maheshmunda	MMD					
Mahidpur Road	MEP					
Mahim Junction	MM	Maharashtra	WR/Western/Harbour (CR)			
Mahisgaon	MGO					
Mahmudabad Avdh	MMB	Uttar Pradesh				
Mahmudpur SRYN	MZN					
Mahoba	MBA	Uttar Pradesh				
Maholi	MAHO					
Mahpur	MHO					
Mahuamilan	MMLN					
Mahuariya	MXY					
Mahuda Junction	MHQ	Jharkhand				
Mahugarha	MUGA					
Mahur	MXR	Assam	NFR/Northeast Frontier	549 m		
Mahuva Junction	MHV	Gujarat				
Maibang	MBG	Assam	NFR/Northeast Frontier	330 m		
Maihar	MYR	Madhya Pradesh				
Maikalganj	MINJ					
Mailam	MTL	Tamil Nadu				
Mailani Junction	MLN	Uttar Pradesh				
Mailongdisa	MGX	Assam	NFR/Northeast Frontier	290 m		
Mainpuri	MNQ	Uttar Pradesh				
Mairabari	MBO	Assam	NFR/Northeast Frontier	64 m		
Mairwa	MW	Bihar		Majri junction	mjri	
Majbat	MJBT					
Majgaon	MZQ	Assam	NFR/Northeast Frontier	51 m		
Majhagawan	MJG	Uttar Pradesh				
Majhola Pakarya	MJZ					
Makhu	MXH	Haryana				
Makrana Junction	MKN	Rajasthan				
Makrera	MKRA					
Makronia	MKRN	Madhya Pradesh				
Maksi	MKC	Madhya Pradesh				
Malad	MDD	Maharashtra	WR/Western			
Malarna	MLZ					
Malavli	MVL	Maharashtra	CR			
Malda Town	MLDT	West Bengal	ER/Eastern Railways	30m		
Malerkotla	MET	Punjab				
Malethu Kanak	MEQ					
Malhargarh	MLG					
Malhour	ML					
Malihabad	MLD					
Malipur	MLPR					
Maliya Hatina	MLHA					
Maliya Miyana	MALB	Gujarat				
Malkapur	MKU	Maharashtra				
Malkhaid Road	MQR	Maharashtra				
Malkisar	MLC					
Mallanwala Khas	MWX					
Malleswaram	MWM					
Malliyam	MY					
Malout	MOT					
Malpura	MLA					
Malsailu	MLSU					
Malsian Shahkht	MQS					
Malugur	MLU					
Malur	MLO	Karnataka				
Malwan	MWH	Uttar Pradesh				
Malwara	MBW	Rajasthan				
Maman	MOM					
Mambalam	MBM	Tamil Nadu				
Manaksar	MNSR					
Manamadurai Junction	MNM	Tamil Nadu				
Mananpur	MNP					
Manaparai	MPA	Tamil Nadu				
Manauri railway station	MRE	Uttar Pradesh				
Manavadar	MVR					
Mancherial	MCI	Telangana				
Mancheswar	MCS	Odisha				
Manda Road	MNF					
Mandagere	MGF					
Mandal	MDL					
Mandalgarh	MLGH					
Mandapam	MMM	Tamil Nadu				
Mandapam Camp	MC					
Mandar Hill	MDLE	Bihar				
Mandasa Road	MMS	Andhra Pradesh				
Mandasor	MDS	Madhya Pradesh				
Mandaveli	MDVE	Tamil Nadu				
Manderdisa	MYD	Assam	NFR/Northeast Frontier	216 m		
Mandhana Junction, Kanpur	MDA	Uttar Pradesh				
Mandi Adampur	ADR	Haryana				
Mandi Bamora	MABA	Madhya Pradesh				
Mandi Dabwali	MBY	Haryana				
Mandi Dhanaura	MNDR					
Mandi Dip	MDDP	Madhya Pradesh				
Mandla Fort	MFR	Madhya Pradesh				
Mandor	MDB	Rajasthan				
Mandrak	MXK					
Manduadih	MUV	Uttar Pradesh				
Mandya	MYA	Karnataka				
Manendragarh	M					
Mangalagiri	MAG	Andhra Pradesh				
Mangaliyawas	MLI					
Mangaluru Central	MAQ	Karnataka				
Mangaluru Junction	MAJN	Karnataka				
Mangaon	MNI	Maharashtra	KR / Konkan Railway	12 m		
Mangliya Gaon	MGG	Madhya Pradesh				
Mangolpuri	MGLP	Delhi				
Mangra	MAZ					
Manheru	MHU					
Manigachi	MGI					
Manikpur Junction	MKP	Uttar Pradesh				
Maninagar	MAN	Gujarat				
Manipur Bagan	MOAR	Assam	NFR/Northeast Frontier	41 m		
Vanchi Maniyachchi Junction	MEJ	Tamil Nadu				
Manjeshwar	MJS					
Mankapur Junction	MUR	Uttar Pradesh				
Mankar	MNAE					
Mankarai	MNY					
Mankatha	MKB					
Mankhurd	MNKD	Maharashtra	Harbour (CR)			
Manki	MANK					
Manmad Junction	MMR	Maharashtra				
Mannanur	MNUR					
Manoharganj	MNJ					
Manoharpur	MOU					
Mansa	MSZ	Punjab				
Mansarovar		Maharashtra	Harbour (CR)			
Mansi Junction	MNE	Bihar				
Mansurpur	MSP					
Manthralayam Road	MALM	Andhra Pradesh				
Manuguru	MUGR	Telangana				
Manwal	MNVL	Jammu and Kashmir	NR/Northern	490 m		
Manwath Road	MVO	Maharashtra				
Manzurgarhi	MZGI					
Marahra	MH					
Maraimalai Nagar	MMNK	Tamil Nadu				
Maramjhiri	MJY					
Marauda	MXA					
Mariahu	MAY					
Mariani Junction	MXN	Assam	NFR/Northeast Frontier			
Marikuppam	MKM					
Marine Lines	MEL	Maharashtra	WR/Western			
Maripat	MIU					
Markapur Road	MRK	Andhra Pradesh				
Markundi	MKD					
Maroli	MRL	Gujarat				
Marsul	MRV					
Marthipalayam	MPLM					
Marwar Bagra	MBGA	Rajasthan				
Marwar Balia	MBSK	Rajasthan				
Marwar Bhinmal	MBNL	Rajasthan				
Marwar Birthi	MBT	Rajasthan				
Marwar Chapri	MCPE	Rajasthan				
Marwar Junction	MJ	Rajasthan				
Marwar Kori	KOF	Rajasthan				
Marwar Lohwat	MWT	Rajasthan				
Marwar Mathanya	MMY	Rajasthan				
Marwar Mundwa	MDW	Rajasthan				
Marwar Ratanpur	MSQ	Rajasthan				
Masit	MST					
Masjid Bunder	MSD	Maharashtra	CR/Central/Harbour			
Maskanwa	MSW					
Masodha	MSOD					
Masrakh	MHC					
Masur	MSR					
Matana Buzurg	MABG					
Mataundh	MTH					
Mathura Cantonment	MRT	Uttar Pradesh				
Mathurapur	MUW	Jharkhand	Eastern Railway Zone	Mathura Junction	MTJ	Uttar Pradesh
Matlabpur	MTB					
Matmari	MTU					
Mattancheri Halt	MTNC					
Matunga	MTN	Maharashtra	CR/Central			
Matunga Road	MRU	Maharashtra	WR/Western			
Mau Aimma	MEM	Uttar Pradesh				
Mau Junction	MAU	Uttar Pradesh				
Mau Ranipur	MRPR	Uttar Pradesh				
Maur	MAUR	Punjab				
Maval	MAA					
Mavelikara	MVLK	Kerala				
Mavli Junction	MVJ	Rajasthan				
Mayanoor	MYU	Tamil Nadu				
Mayiladuthurai Junction	MV	Tamil Nadu				
Mayyanad	MYY	Kerala				
Mazhama Rajwansher	RWSR	Jammu and Kashmir	NR/Northern	1580 m		
Mazhom	MZMA	Jammu and Kashmir	NR/Northern	1587 m		
McCluskieganj	MGME	Uttar Pradesh				
Mecheda	MCA	West Bengal				
Medchal	MED	Telangana				
Meerut Cantonment	MUT	Uttar Pradesh				
Meenambakkam	MN	Tamil Nadu				
Meerut City	MTC	Uttar Pradesh				
Meghnagar	MGN	Madhya Pradesh				
Mehnar Road	MNO					
Mehsi	MAI					
Meja Road	MJA					
Melmaruvattur	MLMR					
Melusar	MELH					
Mendipathar	MNDP	Meghalaya				
Memari	MYM					
Meralgram	MQX					
Merta City	MEC	Rajasthan				
Merta Road Junction	MTD	Rajasthan				
Mettur	MTE	Tamil Nadu				
Metupalaiyam	MTP	Tamil Nadu				
Mettur Dam	MTDM	Tamil Nadu				
Mhasavad	MWD	Maharashtra				
Mahemdavad Kheda Road	MHD	Gujarat				
Mhow	MHOW	Madhya Pradesh				
Midnapore	MDN	West Bengal				
Migrendisa	MGE	Assam	NFR/Northeast Frontier	484 m		
Mihinpurwa	MIN					
Mihrawan	MIH					
Milak	MIL					
Minjur	MJR	Tamil Nadu	SR/Southern	8 m		
Miraj Junction	MRJ	Maharashtra	CR/Central			
Miranpur Katra	MK					
Mira Road	MIRA	Maharashtra	WR/Western			
Mirchadhori	MCQ					
Mirhakur	MIQ					
Mirjan	MRJN	Karnataka	Konkan Railway			
Mirthal	MRTL	Punjab				
Mirza	MRZA	Assam	NFR/Northeast Frontier	51 m		
Mirzapali	MZL					
Miryalaguda	MRGA	Telangana				
Mirzapur	MZP	Uttar Pradesh				
Misamari	MSMI					
Misrauli	MFL					
Mitha	MITA					
Mithapur	MTHP					
Miyagam Karjan	MYG	Gujarat				
Miyana	MYN	Gujarat				
Miyona ka Bara	MNKB	Rajasthan				
Modelgram	MG					
Modinagar	MDNR	Uttar Pradesh				
Modnimb	MLB					
Modpur	MDPR					
Modran	MON					
Moga	MOGA	Punjab				
Mohammadkhera	MQE					
Mohanlalganj	MLJ	Uttar Pradesh				
Mohanpur Junction	MHUR	Jharkhand	Eastern Railways	265		
Mohiuddinnagar	MOG					
Mohiuddinpur	MUZ	Uttar Pradesh				
Mohol	MO					
Mohri	MOY	Haryana				
Mokalsar	MKSR	Rajasthan				
Mokama Junction	MKA	Bihar				
Mokholi	MXL					
Monabari	MFC					
Monacherra	MNCR	Assam	NFR/Northeast Frontier	25 m		
Mondh	MOF					
Munger	MGR	Bihar				
Monglajhora	MONJ	Assam	NFR/Northeast Frontier	48 m		
Moore Market Complex (Chennai Central Suburban)	MMC	Tamil Nadu	SR/Southern			
Moradabad	MB	Uttar Pradesh				
Morak	MKX					
Morappur	MAP	Tamil Nadu				
Morbi	MVI	Gujarat				
Mordar	MRDD					
Morena	MRA	Madhya Pradesh				
Mori Bera	MOI					
Morinda	MRND	Punjab				
Morthala	MXO					
Mota Jadra	MQZ					
Moterjhar	MTJR	Assam	NFR/Northeast Frontier	31 m		
Moth	MOTH	Uttar Pradesh				
Mothala	MTIA					
Mothala Halt	MTHH					
Motichur	MOTC					
Bapudham Motihari	BMKI	Bihar				
Motipur	MTR					
Motipura Chauki	MTPC					
Moula-Ali	MOU	Telangana				
Muddanuru	MOO					
Mudkhed Junction	MUE	Maharashtra				
Muftiganj	MFJ					
Mughal Sarai Junction	MGS	Uttar Pradesh				
Muhammadabad	MMA					
Muirpur Road	MPF					
Mukerian	MEX	Punjab				
Mukhtiar Balwar	MKT					
Muktsar	MKS	Punjab				
Mukundarayapuram	MCN					
Muli Road	MOL					
Mulki	MULK					
Mullanpur	MLX	Punjab				
Mulanur						
Multai	MTY	Madhya Pradesh				
Mulund	MLND	Maharashtra	CR/Central			
Mumbai Central	BCT	Maharashtra	WR/Western			
Mumbra		Maharashtra	CR/Central			
Munabao	MBF	Rajasthan				
Mundakanniamman Koil	MKMK	Tamil Nadu				
Mundalaram	MDLM					
Mundha Pande	MPH					
Mundhewadi	MVE					
Mungaoli	MNV					
Muniguda	MNGD	Odisha				
Munirabad	MRB					
Munroturuttu	MQO	Kerala				
Mupa	MUPA	Assam	NFR/Northeast Frontier	277 m		
Muradnagar	MUD	Uttar Pradesh				
Murdeshwar	MDRW					
Murdeshwar	MRDW					
Muri	MURI	Jharkhand				
Murkeongselek		MZS	Assam			
Murliganj	MRIJ					
Murshadpur	MSDR					
Murshidabad	MBB	West Bengal				
Murtizapur Junction	MZR	Maharashtra				
Musafir Khana	MFKA	Uttar Pradesh				
Mustafabad	MFB					
Muttarasanallur	MTNL					
Mutupet	MTT					
Muzaffarnagar	MOZ	Uttar Pradesh				
Muzaffarpur Junction	MFP	Bihar	ECR/East Central Railway	57 m		
Muzzampur Narayan	MZM					
Mysuru Junction	MYS	Karnataka				

== N ==
List of Indian Railways stations whose names start with 'N'

Station name	Station code	State	Railway zone	Elevation	Map
Naya Ghaziabad	GZN	Uttar Pradesh			
N J Ramanal	NJM				
Nabadwip Dham	NDAE	West Bengal			
Nabha	NBA	Punjab			
Nadauj	NDU				
Nadiad Junction	ND	Gujarat			
Nandikoor	NAND	Karnataka	KRCL		
Nadikudi	NDKD	Andhra Pradesh			
Nagal	NGL				
Naganahalli	NHY	Karnataka	South Western Railway		
Nagaon	NGAN	Assam	NFR/Northeast Frontier	68 m	
Nagappattinam junction	NGT	Tamil Nadu			
Nagar	NGE	Rajasthan			
Nagar Untari	NUQ	Jharkhand			
Nagercoil Junction	NCJ	Tamil Nadu			
Nagardevla	NGD				
Nagargali	NAG				
Nagari	NGI	Andhra Pradesh			
Nagaria Sadat	NRS				
Nagarur	NRR				
Nagaur	NGO	Rajasthan			
Nagbhir Junction	NAB	Maharashtra			
Nagda Junction	NAD	Madhya Pradesh			
Nagercoil Town	NGK	Tamil Nadu			
Nagina	NGG	Uttar Pradesh			
Naglatula	NGLT				
Nagore	NCR	Tamil Nadu			
Nagpur	NGP	Maharashtra			
Nagrota	NGRT	Punjab			
Naharkatiya	NHK				
Naharlagun	NHLN	Arunachal Pradesh	North Frontier	138 m	
Nahur	NHU	Maharashtra	CR/Central		
Naigaon	NIG	Maharashtra	WR/Western		
Naihati Junction	NH	West Bengal			
Naikheri	NKI				
Naila	NIA	Chhattisgarh	South East Central	294 m	
Naini	NYN	Uttar Pradesh			
Nainpur Junction	NIR	Madhya Pradesh	South East Central	446 m	
Najibabad Junction	NBD				
Nakodar Junction	NRO				
Nalanda	NLD	Bihar			
Nallasopara	NSP	Maharashtra	WR/Western		
Nalbari	NLV	Assam	NFR/Northeast Frontier	54 m	
Nalgonda	NLDA	Telangana			
Nalhati	NHT	West Bengal			
Naliya	NLY	Gujarat			
Naliya Cantonment	NLC	Gujarat			
Nalwar	NW				
Namakkal	NMKL	Tamil Nadu	Southern Railways		
Namburu	NBR				
Namkom	NKM	Jharkhand			
Namli	NLI				
Namrup	NAM	Assam			
Nana	NANA				
Nana Bhamodra	NBHM				
Nanaksar	NNKR				
Nandalur	NRE	Andhra Pradesh			
Nandapur	NDPR				
Hazur Sahib Nanded	NED	Maharashtra			
Nandesari	NDR	Gujarat			
Nandganj	NDJ				
Nandgaon	NGN	Maharashtra			
Nandgaon Road	NAN				
Nandiambakkam	NPKM	Tamil Nadu	SR/Southern	6 m	
Nandikoor		Karnataka	KRCL		
Nandol Dehegam	NHM				
Nandura	NN	Maharashtra			
Nandurbar	NDB	Maharashtra			
Nandyal Junction	NDL	Andhra Pradesh			
Nangal Dam	NLDM	Punjab			
Nangloi	NNO	Delhi			
Nanguneri	NNN	Tamil Nadu			
Nanjangud Town	NTW	Karnataka			
Nanpara Junction	NNP				
Naojan	NJN				
Napasar	NPS	Rajasthan			
Nar Town	NTN				
Naraikkinar	NRK	Tamil Nadu	SR/Southern	50 m	
Naraina	NRI	Delhi			
Narangi	NNGE	Assam	NFR/Northeast Frontier	54 m	
Naranjipur	NRGR				
Narasapur	NS	Andhra Pradesh			
Narasaraopet	NRT	Andhra Pradesh			
Narayanpet Road	NRPD				
Narayanpur	NNR	Assam			
Narayanpur Anant	NRPA	Bihar	ECR/ East Central Railway	56 m	
Nardana	NDN				
Narela	NUR	Delhi			
Nari Road	NROD				
Nariaoli	NOI				
Narkatiaganj Junction	NKE	Bihar		68 m	
Narkher	NRKR	Maharashtra			
Narnaul	NNL	Haryana			
Naroda	NRD				
Narsinghpur	NU	Madhya Pradesh			
Narwana Junction	NRW	Haryana			
Narwasi	NRWI				
Nasik Road	NK	Maharashtra			
Nasirabad	NSD				
Nathapettai	NTT	Tamil Nadu			
Nathdwara	NDT	Rajasthan			
Nathwana	NTZ				
Naugachia	NNA	Bihar			
Nauganwan	NGW				
Naugarh	NUH	Uttar Pradesh			
Naupada Junction	NWP	Andhra Pradesh			
Nautanwa	NTV	Uttar Pradesh			
Navde Road		Maharashtra	CR/Central		
Navagadh	NUD				
Navalur	NVU				
Navapur	NWU	Gujarat			
Navlakhi	NLK				
Navsari	NVS	Gujarat	WR/Western	14 m	
Nawa City	NAC	Rajasthan			
Nawadah (Nawada)	NWD	Bihar	ECR/East Central Railway	93 m	
Nawagaon	NVG				
Nawalgarh	NWH	Rajasthan			
Nawalgohan	NVLN				
Naya Azadpur	NDAZ	Delhi			
Naya Kharadia	NYK	Rajasthan			
Naya Nangal	NNGL	Punjab			
Nayadupeta	NYP	Andhra Pradesh			
Nayagaon	NYO	Bihar			
Nayandahalli	NYH	Karnataka	South Western Railway		
Naydongri	NI				
Nazareth	NZT	Tamil Nadu			
Nazirganj	NAZJ				
Nekonda	NKD	Telangana			
Nellimaria	NML				
Nellore	NLR	Andhra Pradesh			
Nemilichery	NEC	Tamil Nadu	SR/Southern	32.05 m	
Nemom	NEM	Kerala	SR/Southern	23.716 m	
Nenpur	NEP				
Nepalganj Road	NPR	Uttar Pradesh			
Nepanagar	NPNR	Madhya Pradesh			
Neral Junction	NRL	Maharashtra	CR/Central		
Nergundi	NRG				
Neri	NERI	Uttar Pradesh	NR/Northern	149 m	
Nerul	NU	Maharashtra	Harbour/Trans-Harbour (CR)		
Netaji Subhas Chandra Bose Junction Gomoh	GMO	Jharkhand			
Netawal	NTWL				
New Alipurduar	NOQ	West Bengal			
New Bhuj	NBUJ	Gujarat			
New Bhuj	NBVJ				
New Bongaigaon Junction	NBQ	Assam	NFR/Northeast Frontier	59 m	
New Cooch Behar	NCB	West Bengal			
New Delhi	NDLS	Delhi NCT	NR/Northern	215 m	
New Farakka Junction	NFK	West Bengal			
New Garia	NGRI	West Bengal	ER/Eastern Railway		
New Giridih	NGRH	Jharkhand	East Central Railway zone		
New Gitldada Junction	NGTG				
New Guntur	NGNT	Andhra Pradesh			
New Jalpaiguri	NJP	West Bengal	NFR		
New Mal Junction	NMZ	West Bengal			
New Maynaguri	NMX	West Bengal			
New Misamari	NMM	Assam	NFR/Northeast Frontier	93 m	
Neyveli	NVL	Tamil Nadu			
Neyyattinkara	NYY	Kerala	SR/Southern	11 m	
Ngrjunanagaramu	NGJN				
Nibhapur	NBP				
Nidadavolu Junction	NDD	Andhra Pradesh			
Nidamangalam Junction	NMJ	Tamil Nadu			
Nidubrolu	NDO	Andhra Pradesh			
Nigohan	NHN				
Nihalgarh	NHH	Uttar Pradesh			
Nilaje		Maharashtra	CR/Central		
Nilambazar	NLBR	Assam	NFR/Northeast Frontier	20 m	
Nilambur Road	NIL	Kerala			
Nileshwar	NLE				
Nilokheri	NLKR	Haryana			
Nim Ka Thana	NMK	Rajasthan			
Nimach	NMH	Madhya Pradesh			
Nimar Kheri	NKR	Madhya Pradesh	Western	182 m	
Nimbahera	NBH	Rajasthan			
Nimbhora	NB				
Nimtita	NILE	West Bengal			
Nindhar Benar	NDH	Rajasthan			
Ningala Junction	NGA				
Nipani Vadgaon	NPW				
Niphad	NR				
Nira	NIRA				
Nirakarpur	NKP	Odisha			
Nirmali	NMA				
Nisui	NSU				
Nivari	NEW				
Nivasar	NIV				
Nizamabad	NZB	Telangana	SCR/South Central Railway	384 m	
Nizampur	NIP				
Nizbarganj	NBX				
Nizchatia	NCA				
Noamundi	NOMD	Jharkhand			
Nohar	NHR	Rajasthan			
Nokha	NOK	Rajasthan			
Nomoda	NMD				
Nonera	NNE				
Norla Road	NRLR	Odisha			
North Lakhimpur	NLP	Assam			
Nosaria	NOA				
Nowrozabad	NRZB				
Noyal	NOY				
Narayanpur Tatwar	NNW				
Nua	NUA				
Nungambakkam	NBK	Tamil Nadu			
Nunkhar	NRA				
Nurmahal	NRM				

== O ==
List of Indian Railways stations whose names start with 'O'

Station name	Station code	State	Railway zone	Elevation	Map
Okha	OKHA	Gujarat	Western	5 m	
Delhi Junction	DLI	Delhi	Northern	219 m	
Old Malda Junction	OMFL	West Bengal	Northeast Frontier	31 m	
Omkareshwar Road	OMR	Madhya Pradesh	Western	182 m	
Ondagram	ODM	West Bengal	South Eastern	76 m	
Ongole	OGL	Andhra Pradesh	South Central	12 m	
Ontimitta	OMT	Andhra Pradesh	South Central	134 m	
Orai	ORAI	Uttar Pradesh	North Central	139 m	
Ottapalam	OTP	Kerala	Southern	30 m	
Oorgaum	OGM	Karnataka	South Western	867 m	

== P ==
List of Indian Railways stations whose names start with 'P'

Station name	Station code	State	Railway zone	Elevation	Map
Pabai	PAI	Madhya Pradesh	WCR/West Central	432 m	
Pabli Khas	PQY	Uttar Pradesh	NR/Northern	230 m	
Pachrukhi	PCK	Bihar	NER/North Eastern	67 m	
Pachhapur	PCH	Karnataka	SWR/South Western		
Pachor Road	PFR	Madhya Pradesh	WCR/West Central	426 m	
Pachora Junction	PC	Maharashtra	CR/Central	258 m	
Pachperwa	PPW	Uttar Pradesh	NER/North Eastern		
Paddhari	PDH	Gujarat	WR/Western	70 m	
Padhegaon	PDGN	Maharashtra	CR/Central	512 m	
Padrauna	POU	Uttar Pradesh	NER/North Eastern	91 m	
Padse	PDP	Maharashtra	WR/Western	185 m	
Padubidri	PDD	Karnataka	KR/Konkan	21 m	
Pagara	PGA	Madhya Pradesh	WCR/West Central	494 m	
Pahara	PRE	Uttar Pradesh	NCR/North Central		
Paharpur	PRP	Bihar	ECR/East Central		
Pajian	PJA	Punjab	NR/Northern		
Pakala Junction	PAK	Andhra Pradesh	SCR/Southern Central	371 m	
Pakki	PKK	Punjab	NR/Northern		
Pakur	PKR	Jharkhand	ER/Eastern	37 m	
Palachauri	PCLI	Madhya Pradesh	CR/Central	791 m	
Palam	PM	Delhi	NR/Northern	218 m	
Palampur Himachal railway station	PLMX	Himachal Pradesh	NR/Northern	1116 m	
Palana	PAE	Rajasthan	NER/North Western	263 m	
Palani	PLNI	Tamil Nadu	SR/Southern	322 m	
Palanpur Junction	PNU	Gujarat	WR/Western	231 m	
Palappuram	PLPM	Kerala	SR/Southern	42 m	
Palasa	PSA	Andhra Pradesh	ECoR/East Coast	24 m	
Palasdari	PDI	Maharashtra	CR/Central	62 m	
Palayamkottai	PCO	Tamil Nadu			
Palayaseevaram	PYV	Tamil Nadu			
Paldhi	PLD	Maharashtra	WR/Western	208 m	
Pahlejaghat Junction	PHLG	Bihar	ECR/East Central		
Palej	PLJ	Gujarat	WR/Western	28 m	
Palghar	PLG	Maharashtra	WR/Western	15 m	
Palakkad Junction	PGT	Kerala	SR/Southern		
Palakkad Town	PGTN	Kerala	SR/Southern	84 m	
Palakollu	PKO	Andhra Pradesh	SCR/South Central	~1.9 m	
Pali Marwar	PMY	Rajasthan	NWR/North Western		
Palia	PLA	Madhya Pradesh	WR/Western		
Palia Kalan	PLK	Uttar Pradesh	NER/North Eastern	156 m	
Palitana	PIT	Gujarat	WR/Western		
Pallavaram	PV	Tamil Nadu			
Palpara	PXR	West Bengal	ER/Eastern	14 m	
Palsana	PLSN	Rajasthan	NWR/North Western		
Palsora Makrawa	PSO	Madhya Pradesh	WR/Western	500 m	
Palur	PALR	Tamil Nadu			
Palwal	PWL	Haryana	NR/Northern	199 m	
Pamba Kovil Shandy	PBKS	Tamil Nadu	SR/Southern		
Pamban Junction	PBM	Tamil Nadu	SR/Southern	7 m	
Pampur	PMPE	Jammu and Kashmir	NR/Northern	1594 m	
Panagarh	PAN	West Bengal	ER/Eastern	32 m	
Panbari	PNB	Assam	NFR/Northeast Frontier	53 m	
Panch Pipila	PCN	Madhya Pradesh	WR/Western	370 m	
Panch Rukhi	PHRH	Himachal Pradesh	NR/Northern	1053 m	
Pancharatna	PNVT	Assam	NFR/Northeast Frontier	49 m	
Panchgram	PNGM	Assam	NFR/Northeast Frontier	28 m	
Panchtalavda Rd	PCT	Gujarat	WR/Western	107 m	
Pandavapura	PANP	Karnataka	SWR/South Western	716 m	
Pandaravadai	PDV	Tamil Nadu	SR/Southern railway	37 m	
Pandharpur	PVR	Maharashtra	CR/Central	463 m	
Pandhurna	PAR	Madhya Pradesh	CR/Central	478 m	
Pandoli	PMO	Rajasthan	NWR/North Western		
Paneli Moti	PLM	Gujarat	WR/Western		
Paniahwa	PNYA	Uttar Pradesh	NER/North Eastern		
Panikhaiti	PHI	Assam	NFR/Northeast Frontier	55 m	
Panipat Junction	PNP	Haryana	NR/Northern	235 m	
Panitola	PNT	Assam	NFR/Northeast Frontier		
Panjhan	PJN	Maharashtra	CR/Central	513 m	
Panki	PNK	Uttar Pradesh	NCR/North Central	129 m	
Panruti	PRT	Tamil Nadu	SR/Southern	27 m	
Panskura Junction	PKU	West Bengal	SER/South Eastern	5 m	
Pantnagar	PBW	Uttarakhand	NER/North Eastern	236 m	
Panvel	PNVL	Maharashtra	CR/Central	12 m	
Panzgom	PJGM	Jammu and Kashmir	NR/Northern	1592 m	
Papanasam	PML	Tamil Nadu	SR/Southern	32 m	
Paradgaon	PDG	Maharashtra	SCR/South Central	455 m	
Paralakhemundi	PLH	Odisha	ECoR/East Coast	60 m	
Paramakkudi	PMK	Tamil Nadu	SR/Southern	42 m	
Parangipettai	PO	Tamil Nadu	SR/Southern	6 m	
Paranur	PWU	Tamil Nadu			
Paras	PS	Maharashtra	CR/Central	282 m	
Parasia	PUX	Madhya Pradesh	CR/Central	775 m	
Parasnath Station	PNME	Jharkhand	East Central Railway	228 m	
Paravur	PVU	Kerala	SR/Southern railway	18 m	
Parbati	PRB	Madhya Pradesh	WR/Western	472 m	
Parbhani Junction	PBN	Maharashtra	SCR/South Central	412 m	
Pardhande	PHQ	Maharashtra	CR/Central	243 m	
Pardi	PAD	Gujarat	WR/Western		
Parel	PR	Maharashtra	CR/Central		
Parhihara	PIH	Maharashtra	CR/Central	6 m	
Parkham	PRK	Uttar Pradesh	NCR/North Central		
Parli	PLL	Kerala	SR/Southern	63 m	
Parli Vaijnath	PRLI	Maharashtra	SCR/South Central		
Parlu	PRU	Rajasthan	NWR//North Western		
Parappanangadi	PGI	Kerala	SR/Southern	10 m	
Parsa Bazar	PRBZ	Bihar	ECR/East Central	55 m	
Parsa Khera	PKRA	Uttar Pradesh	NR/Northern	170 m	
Parsabad	PSB	Jharkhand	ECR/East Central	339 m	
Parsipur	PRF	Uttar Pradesh	NR/Northern	88 m	
Parsoda	PSD	Maharashtra	SCR/South Central	530 m	
Pratapgarh Junction	MBDP	Uttar Pradesh	NR/Northern		
Partapur	PRTP	Uttar Pradesh	NR/Northern	225 m	
Partur	PTU	Maharashtra	SCR/South Central	464 m	
Parvatipuram	PVP	Andhra Pradesh	ECoR/East Coast	122 m	
Parvatipuram Town	PVPT	Andhra Pradesh	ECoR/East Coast		
Pasur	PAS	Tamil Nadu	SR/Southern	153 m	
Patal Pani	PTP	Madhya Pradesh	WR/Western	572 m	
Patan	PTN	Gujarat	WR/Western		
Patara	PTRE	Uttar Pradesh	NCR/North Central	129 m	
Patas	PAA	Maharashtra	CR/Central		
Pataudi Road	PTRD	Haryana	NR/Northern	228 m	
Pathankot Junction	PTK	Punjab	NR/Northern	330 m	
Pathankot Cantt	PTKC	Punjab	NR/Northern	326 m	
Pathardih Junction	PEH	Jharkhand	ECR/East Central		
Patharkandi	PTKD	Assam	NFR/Northeast Frontier	27 m	
Patharkhola	PKB	Assam	NFR/Northeast Frontier	124 m	
Patharia	PHA	Madhya Pradesh	WCR/West Central	384 m	
Pathauli	PTLI	Uttar Pradesh	NCR/North Central		
Pathri	PRI	Uttarakhand	NR/Northern	257 m	
Pathsala	PBL	Assam	NFR/Northeast Frontier	47 m	
Patiala	PTA	Punjab	NR/Northern	252 m	
FpePatiladaha	PTLD	Assam	NFR/Northeast Frontier	49 m	
Patli	PT	Haryana	NR/Northern	226 m	
Patna Junction	PNBE	Bihar	ECR/East Central	57 m	
Patna Saheb	PNC	Bihar	ECR/East Central	58 m	
Patranga	PTH	Uttar Pradesh	NR/Northern		
Patratu	PTRU	Jharkhand	ECR/East Central	372 m	
Patsul	PTZ	Maharashtra	SCR/South Central		
Pattabiram	PAB	Tamil Nadu	SR/Southern	31 m	
Pattabiram West	PRWS	Tamil Nadu	SR/Southern	40 m	
Pattabiram East Depot	PRES	Tamil Nadu	SR/Southern	40 m	
Pattambi	PTB	Kerala	SR/Southern	24 m	
Pattan	PTTN	Jammu and Kashmir	NR/Northern	1580 m	
Pattaravakkam	PVM	Tamil Nadu	SR/Southern	16.01 m	
Pattukkottai	PKT	Tamil Nadu	SR/Southern	21 m	
Patti	PAX	Punjab	NR/Northern	220 m	
Pattikkad Halt	PKQ	Kerala	SR/Southern	61 m	
Pavur Chatram	PCM	Tamil Nadu	SR/Southern	158 m	
Pawapuri Road	PQE	Bihar	ECR/East Central	61 m	
Payagpur	PDR	Uttar Pradesh	NER/North Eastern		
Payangadi	PAZ	Kerala	SR/Southern	9 m	
Payyanur	PAY	Kerala	SR/Southern	9 m	
Payyoli	PYOL	Kerala	SR/Southern	12 m	
Pazhavanthangal	PZA	Tamil Nadu			
Peddapalli	PDPL	Telangana	SCR/South Central	230	
Pendra Road	PND	Chhattisgarh	SECR/South East Central	618 m	
Penganga	PGG	Maharashtra	SCR/South Central	494 m	
Penukonda	PKD	Andhra Pradesh	SWR/South Western	547 m	
Perambur	PER	Tamil Nadu	SR/Southern	7 m	
Perambur Carriage Works	PCW	Tamil Nadu	SR/Southern	7.16 m	
Perambur Loco Works	PEW	Tamil Nadu	SR/Southern	7.01 m	
Pernem railway station	PERN	Goa	KR/Konkan	18 m	
Perugamani	PGN	Tamil Nadu	SR/Southern	85 m	
Perungalathur	PRGL	Tamil Nadu			
Perungudi	PRGD	Tamil Nadu	SR/Southern		
Petlad Junction	PTD	Gujarat	WR/Western		
Pethanaickenpalayam	PDKM	Tamil Nadu	SR/Southern	262.0 m	
Pettaivayatalai	PLI	Tamil Nadu	SR/Southern	85 m	
Phagwara Junction	PGW	Punjab	NR/Northern	242 m	
Phakhoagram	PKGM	Assam	NFR/Northeast Frontier	36 m	
Phalodi	PLC	Rajasthan	NWR/North Western	232 m	
Phanda	PUD	Madhya Pradesh	WR/Western	453 m	
Phaphamau Junction	PFM	Uttar Pradesh	NR/Northern	93 m	
Phaphund	PHD	Uttar Pradesh	NCR/North Central	133 m	
Phephna Junction	PEP	Uttar Pradesh	NER/North Eastern		
Phesar	PES	Bihar	ECR/East Central		
Phillaur Junction	PHR	Punjab	NR/Northern	241 m	
Phulad	FLD	Rajasthan	NWR/North Western	352 m	
Phulaguri	PUY	Assam	NFR/Northeast Frontier	64 m	
Phulera Junction	FL	Rajasthan	NWR/North Western	386 m	
Phulia	FLU	West Bengal	ER/Eastern	15 M	
Phulpur	PLP	Uttar Pradesh	NR/Northern	95 m	
Pij	PIJ	Gujarat	WR/Western	34 m	
Pilamedu	PLMD	Tamil Nadu	SR/Southern	420 m	
Pili Bangan	PGK	Rajasthan	NWR/North Western	177 m	
Pilibhit Junction railway station	PBE	Uttar Pradesh	NER/North Eastern		
Piloda	PDZ	Rajasthan	WCR/West Central	245 m	
Piler	PIL	Andhra Pradesh	SCR/South Central		
Pilkhua	PKW	Uttar Pradesh	NR/Northern		
Pimpar Khed	PKE	Maharashtra	CR/Central	462 m	
Pimpri	PMP	Maharashtra	CR/Central	569 m	
Pindra Road	PDRD	Uttar Pradesh	NR/Northern	82 m	
Pingleshwar	PLW	Madhya Pradesh	WR/Western	509 m	
Pipalda Road	POR	Rajasthan	WCR/West Central	278 m	
Pipalsana	PLS	Uttar Pradesh	NER/North Eastern	204 m	
Pipar Road Junction	PPR	Rajasthan	NER/North Eastern		
Pipariya	PPI	Madhya Pradesh	WCR/West Central	335 m	
Piparpur	PPU	Uttar Pradesh	NR/Northern	100 m	
Piparsand	POF	Uttar Pradesh	NR/Northern		
Piplaj	PPF	Rajasthan	NWR/North Western	449 m	
Piplee	PLE	Gujarat	WR/Western		
Piplia	PIP	Madhya Pradesh	WR/Western	472 m	
Piplod Junction	PPD	Gujarat	WR/Western	209 m	
Piploda Bagla	PPG	Madhya Pradesh	WR/Western	475 m	
Pipraich	PPC	Uttar Pradesh	NER/North Eastern	86 m	
Pipraigaon	PIA	Madhya Pradesh	WCR/West Central		
Piprala	PFL	Gujarat	WR/Western	21 m	
Pipri Dih	PPH	Uttar Pradesh	NER/North Eastern	70 m	
Pirjhalar	PJH	Madhya Pradesh	WR/Western	503 m	
Pirpainti	PPT	Bihar	ER/Eastern	47 m	
Pirthiganj	PHV	Uttar Pradesh	NR/Northern	102 m	
Pirumadara	PRM	Uttarakhand	NER/North Eastern	293 m	
Pirwa	PW	Rajasthan	NWR/North Western	337 m	
Pitambarpur	PMR	Uttar Pradesh	NR/Northern	170 m	
Pithapuram	PAP	Andhra Pradesh	SCR/South Central	18 m	
Plassey	PLY	West Bengal	ER/Eastern	19 m	
Podanur Junction	PTJ	Tamil Nadu	SR/Southern	397 m	
Pokhrayan	PHN	Uttar Pradesh	North Central Railway	120 m	
Pokran	POK	Rajasthan	NWR/North Western		
Pollachi Junction	POY	Tamil Nadu	SR/Southern		
Polur	PRL	Tamil Nadu	SR/Southern	170 m	
Ponmalai (Golden Rock)	GOC	Tamil Nadu	SR/Southern	58 m	
Ponneri	PON	Tamil Nadu	SR/Southern	15 m	
Porbandar	PBR	Gujarat	WR/Western		
Potheri	POTI	Tamil Nadu			
Potul	POZ	Maharashtra	SCR/South Central		
Prabhadevi	EPR	Maharashtra	WR/Western		
Prachi Road Junction	PCC	Gujarat	WR/Western	98 m	
Pranpur Road	PQD	Bihar	NFR/Northeast Frontier	31 m	
Prantij	PRJ	Gujarat	WR/Western		
Prantik	PNE	West Bengal	ER/Eastern	43 m	
Pratapnagar	PRTN	Gujarat	WR/Western	32 m	
Prayag Junction	PRG	Uttar Pradesh	NR/Northern	91 m	
Prayag Ghat	PYG	Uttar Pradesh	NR/Northern		
Pritam Nagar	PRNG	Madhya Pradesh	WR/Western	518 m	
Proddatur	PRDT	Andhra Pradesh	SCR/South Central	162 m	
Puducherry	PDY	Puducherry	SR/Southern	2 m	
Puduchattiram	PUC	Tamil Nadu	SR/Southern	4 m	
Pudukkad	PUK	Kerala	SR/Southern	13 m	
Pudukkottai	PDKT	Tamil Nadu	SR/Southern	90 m	
Pugalur	PGR	Tamil Nadu	SR/Southern	156 m	
Pulgaon Junction	PLO	Maharashtra	CR/Central	273 m	
Punalur	PUU	Kerala	SR/Southern	39 m	
Punarakh	PHK	Bihar	ECR/East Central		
Pundhag	PNW	Jharkhand	SER/South Eastern	291 m	
Pune Junction	PUNE	Maharashtra	CR/Central	560 m	
Punkunnam(Thrissur)	PNQ	Kerala	SR/Southern		
Punpun	PPN	Bihar	ECR/East Central	58 m	
Puntamba	PB	Maharashtra	CR/Central		
Purab Sarai	PBS	Bihar	ER/Eastern	50 m	
Puraini	PNI	Uttar Pradesh	NR/Northern	246 m	
Puranigudam	PUQ	Assam	NFR/Northeast Frontier	69 m	
Puranpur	PP	Uttar Pradesh	NER/North Eastern	184 m	
Puratchi Thalaivar Dr. M.G. Ramachandran Central Railway Station	MAS	Tamil Nadu	SR/Southern	3 m	
Puri	PURI	Odisha	ECoR/East Coast	5 m	
Purna Junction	PAU	Maharashtra	SCR/South Central	382 m	
Purnia Junction	PRNA	Bihar	NFR/Northeast Frontier	44 m	
Purnia Court	PRNC	Bihar	ECR/East Central	42 m	
Purua Khera	PRKE	Uttar Pradesh	NR/Northern	182 m	
Pusad	PUB	Maharashtra	CR/Central	324 m	
Purulia Junction	PRR	West Bengal	SER/South Eastern	234 m	
Putlur	PTLR	Tamil Nadu	SR/Southern		
Puttur	PUT	Andhra Pradesh	SR/Southern	152 m	
Puzhuthivakkam	PZV	Tamil Nadu	SR/Southern		

== Q ==
List of Indian Railways stations whose names start with 'Q'

Station name	Station code	State	Railway zone	Elevation	Map
Quarry SDG	QRS	Odisha	SE		
Qazigund	QG	Jammu and Kashmir	NR/Northern	1722 m	

== R ==
List of Indian Railways stations whose names start with 'R'

Station name	Station code	State	Railway zone	Elevation	Map
Rabale		Maharashtra	Trans-Harbour (CR)		
Radhanpur	RDHP	Gujarat			
Radhikapur railway station	RDP	West Bengal			
Ramavarappadu	RMV	Andhra Pradesh	SCR		
Rae Bareli Junction	RBL	Uttar Pradesh			
Rafiganj	RFJ	Bihar			
Ragaul	RGU				
Raghunathpur	RPR	Bihar			
Raha	RAHA	Assam	NFR/Northeast Frontier	62 m	
Rahimabad, India	RBD				
Rahimatpur	RMP				
Rahul Road	RRE				
Rahuri	RRI	Maharashtra			
Rai Singh Nagar	RSNR				
Raibha railway station	RAI				
Raichur	RC	Karnataka			
Raiganj	RGJ	West Bengal			
Raigarh	RIG	Chhattisgarh			
Raika Bagh	RKB	Rajasthan			
Raila Road	RLR				
Raimehatpur	MTPR				
Raipur Junction	R	Chhattisgarh			
Rairakhol	RAIR	Odisha			
Raisi railway station	RSI				
Raiwala	RWL	Uttarakhand			
Raj Gangpur	GP	Odisha			
Raj Nandgaon	RJN	Chhattisgarh			
Raja Bhat Khawa	RVK				
Raja Ka Sahaspur	RJK	Uttar Pradesh			
Raja Ki Mandi	RKM	Uttar Pradesh	North Central Railway		
Rajaldesar	RJR	Rajasthan			
Rajamundry	RJY	Andhra Pradesh			
Rajapalayam	RJPM	Tamil Nadu			
Rajapur Road	RAJP	Maharashtra			
Rajawari	RJI				
Rajendranagar Terminal	RJPB	Bihar			
Rajgarh	RHG	Rajasthan			
Rajghat Narora	RG	Uttar Pradesh			
Rajgir	RGD	Bihar			
Rajhura	RHR				
Rajiyasar	RJS				
Rajkharsawan Junction	RKSN	Jharkhand			
Rajkot Junction	RJT	Gujarat			
Rajlu Garhi	RUG				
Rajmahal	RJL	Jharkhand			
Rajmane	RM				
Rajosi	ROS				
Rajpipla	RAJ	Gujarat			
Rajpura Junction	RPJ	Punjab			
Rajula City	RJU	Gujarat|			
Rajula Junction	RLA	Gujarat|			
Rajur	RAJR				
Rakha Mines	RHE				
Rakhi	RHI	Rajasthan			
Ram Chaura Road	RMC				
Raman	RMN	Punjab			
Ram Dayalu Nagar	RD	Bihar			
Ramanagaram	RMGM	Karnataka			
Ramanathapuram	RMD	Tamil Nadu			
Ramdevra	RDRA	Rajasthan			
Rameswaram	RMM	Tamil Nadu			
Ramganga	RGB	Uttar Pradesh			
Ramganj	RMGJ				
Ramganj Mandi	RMA	Rajasthan			
Ramgarh Cantonment	RMT	Jharkhand			
Ramgarhwa	RGH	Bihar			
Ramagundam	RDM	Telangana			
Ramkola	RKL				
Ram Mandir	RMAR	Maharashtra	WR/Western		
Ramna	RMF				
Ramnagar (J&K)	RMJK	Jammu and Kashmir	NR/Northern	571 m	
Ramnagar	RMR	Uttarakhand			
Rampur	RMU	Uttar Pradesh			
Rampur Dumra	RDUM				
Rampur Hat	RPH	West Bengal			
Rampura Phul	PUL				
Ramsan	RXN	Gujarat			
Ramsar	RMX	Rajasthan			
Ramtek	RTK	Maharashtra			
Rana Bordi	RNBD				
Ranaghat Junction	RHA	West Bengal			
Ranala	RNL				
Ranapratapnagar	RPZ	Rajasthan			
Ranavav	RWO				
Marwar Ranawas	MRWS	Rajasthan			
Ranchi	RNC	Jharkhand	SER/SouthEastern	632 m	
Ranchi Road	RRME	Jharkhand			
Rangapara North	RPAN	Assam			
Rangiya Junction	RNY	Assam	NFR/Northeast Frontier	53 m	
Rangjuli	RGJI	Assam	NFR/Northeast Frontier	50 m	
Rangmahal	RMH				
Rani	RANI	Rajasthan			
Ranibennur	RNR	Karnataka			
Raniganj	RNG	West Bengal			
Ranipur Road	RNRD				
Raniwara	RNV	Rajasthan			
Ranjangaon Rd	RNJD	Maharashtra			
Ranjani	RNE				
Ranoli	RNO				
Ranolishishu	RNIS				
Ranpur	RUR				
Ranthambhore	RNT	Rajasthan			
Ranuj	RUJ				
Rasra	RSR				
Rasulabad	RUB				
Rasull	RES				
Rasuriya	RYS				
Rasipuram	RASP	Tamil Nadu	SR		
Ratabari	RTBR	Assam	NFR/Northeast Frontier	38 m	
Ratan Shahr	RSH	Rajasthan			
Ratangaon	RTGN				
Ratangarh Junction	RTGH	Rajasthan			
Ratangarh West	RXW	Rajasthan			
Ratanpura	RTP				
Rathdhana	RDDE	Haryana			
Ratlam Junction	RTM	Madhya Pradesh			
Ratnagiri	RN	Maharashtra	KR / Konkan Railway	129 m	
Ratnal	RUT				
Rau	RAU				
Rauzagaon	RZN				
Raver	RV	Maharashtra			
Rawania Dungar	RWJ				
Rawatpur(Kanpur)	RPO	Uttar Pradesh			
Raxaul Junction	RXL	Bihar			
Rayagada	RGDA	Odisha			
Rayalcheruvu	RLO	Andhra Pradesh			
Raybag	RBG				
Rayadurg	RDG	Andhra Pradesh			
Razampeta	RJP				
Reay Road	RRD	Maharashtra	Harbour (CR)		
Rechni Road	RECH				
Reddypalayam	RPM	Tamil Nadu			
Ren	REN				
Renigunta Junction	RU	Andhra Pradesh			
Renukut	RNQ	Uttar Pradesh			
Renwal	RNW				
Reoti B Khera	RBK				
Repalle	RAL	Andhra Pradesh			
Rethorakalan	RAKL				
Rewa Terminal	REWA	Madhya Pradesh			
Rewari Junction	RE	Haryana			
Richha Road	RR	Uttar Pradesh	North Eastern Railway zone	200m	
Richughutu	RCGT				
Ridhore	RID				
Ringas Junction	RGS	Rajasthan			
Risama	RSA				
Rishikesh	RKSH	Uttarakhand			
Rishra	RIS	West Bengal			
Risia	RS				
Rithi	REI				
Rajendar Nagar Bihar	RJPB	Bihar			
Ramgarh Shekhwati	RSWT	Rajasthan			
Raninagar Jalpaiguri	RQJ	West Bengal			
Robertsganj	RBGJ	Uttar Pradesh	NCR	301 m	
Roha	ROHA	Maharashtra	CR/Central		
Rohana Kalan	RNA	Uttar Pradesh			
Rohini	RHNE	Maharashtra			
Rohtak Junction	ROK	Haryana			
Roorkee	RK	Uttarakhand			
Rora	RORA				
Roshanpur	RHN				
Rotegaon	RGO				
Rourkela	ROU	Odisha			
Rowta Bagan	RWTB				
Royapuram	RPM	Tamil Nadu			
Roza Junction	RAC	Uttar Pradesh			
Rudauli	RDL	Uttar Pradesh			
Rudrapur City	RUPC	Uttarakhand			
Rudrapur Road	RUPR				
Rukadi	RKD				
Runija	RNJ				
Runkhera	RNH				
Rupaheli	RPI				
Rupahigaon	RUP	Assam	NFR/Northeast Frontier	69 m	
Rupamau	RUM				
Rupaund	RPD				
Rupasibari	RPB	Assam	NFR/Northeast Frontier	26 m	
Rupbas	RBS				
Rupnagar	RPAR	Punjab			
Rupnarayanpur	RNPR				
Rupra Road	RPRD	Odisha			
Rupsa Junction	ROP	Odisha			
Rura	RRH	Uttar Pradesh	NCR/North Central Railway		
Rusera Ghat	ROA	Bihar			
Ruthiyai Junction	RTA	Madhya Pradesh	WR		

== S ==
List of Indian Railways stations whose names start with 'S'

Station name	Station code	State	Railway zone	Elevation	Map
Swami Narayan Chhapia	SNC	Uttar Pradesh	North Eastern	100 m	
Sabalgarh	SBL	Madhya Pradesh	Northern Central	207 m	
Sabarmati Bridge	SBIC	Gujarat	Western	48 m	
Sabarmati Junction (Metre Gauge)	SBI	Gujarat	Western	57 m	
Sabarmati Junction	SBT	Gujarat	Western	55 m	
Sabarmati South	SBIS	Gujarat	Western	61 m	
Sabaur	SBO	Bihar	Eastern	41 m	
Sabroom	SABRM	Tripura	Northeast Frontier	33 m	
Sachin	SCH	Gujarat	Western	12 m	
Sadar Bazar	DSB	Delhi	Northern Railways	503 m	
Sadat	SDT	Uttar Pradesh	North Eastern	n/a	
Sadhoogarh		Punjab	Northern	270 m	
Sadisopur	SDE	Bihar	East Central	n/a	
Sadulpur Junction	SDLP	Rajasthan	North Western	n/a	
Sadulshahr	SDS	Rajasthan	North Western	183 m	
Sadura	SDUA	Jammu and Kashmir	NR/Northern	1633 m	
Safdarjung	DSJ	Delhi	Northern Railways	503 m	
Safedabad	SFH	Uttar Pradesh	Northern	121 m	
Safilguda	SFX	Telangana	South Central Railway	534 m	
Sagardighi	SDI	West Bengal	Eastern	38 m	
Sagar Jambagaru	SRF	Karnataka	South Western	583 m	
Sagarpali	SVI	Uttar Pradesh	North Eastern	64 m	
Sagauli Junction	SGL	Bihar			
Sagoni	SAO				
Saharanpur Junction	SRE	Uttar Pradesh			
Saharsa Junction	SHC	Bihar			
Sahatwar	STW				
Sahawar Town	SWRT				
Sahibabad Junction	SBB	Uttar Pradesh	Northern Railways	209 m	
Sahibganj Junction	SBG	Jharkhand			
Sahibpur KML Junction	SKJ				
Sahjanwa	SWA				
Sri Sathya Sai Prasanthi Nilayam	SSPN	Andhra Pradesh	South Western	458 m	
Saidapet	SP	Tamil Nadu			
Saidkhanpur	SYK				
Saidraja	SYJ				
Sainthia railway station	SNT	West Bengal	Eastern Railway	58 m	
Saiyid Sarawan	SYWN				
Sajanvar Road	SJF				
Sajiyavadar	SVJ				
Sakaldiha	SLD				
Sakharayapatna (Sakrepatna)	SKPN	Karnataka	South Western Railway		
Sakhi Gopal	SIL	Odisha			
Sakhoti Tanda	SKF				
Sakhpur	SKR				
Sakleshpur	SKLR	Karnataka			
Sakri Junction	SKI				
Saktesgarh	SKGH				
Sakti	SKT	Chhattisgarh			
Salakati	SLKX	Assam	NFR/Northeast Frontier	49 m	
Salamatpur	SMT				
Salar	SALE				
Salarpur	SLRP				
Salawas	SZ	Rajasthan			
Salchapra	SCA	Assam	Northeast Frontier	21 m	
Salekasa	SKS	Maharashtra			
Salem Junction	SA	Tamil Nadu	Southern	283 m	
Salem Market	SAMT	Tamil Nadu			
Salem Town	SXT				
Salemgarhmasani	SJSM				
Salempur Junction	SRU	Uttar Pradesh			
Salogra	SLR				
Salona	SLON	Assam	Northeast Frontier	83 m	
Salpura	SYL				
Salur	SALR	Andhra Pradesh			
Salwa	SAL				
Samaguri	SMGR	Assam	NFR/Northeast Frontier	70 m	
Samakhiali	SIO				
Samakhiali B G	SIOB	Gujarat			
Samalkha	SMK	Haryana			
Samalpatti	SLY	Tamil Nadu			
Samalkot Junction	SLO	Andhra Pradesh			
Samastipur Junction	SPJ	Bihar		43 m	
Samba	SMBX	Jammu and Kashmir	NR/Northern	366 m	
Sambalpur	SBP	Odisha			
Sambalpur Road	SBPD				
Sambhar Salt Lake	SBR	Rajasthan			
Samdhari Junction	SMR	Rajasthan			
Samlaya Junction	SMLA				
Sampla	SPZ	Haryana			
Samrau	SRK				
Samsi	SM				
Sanehwal	SNL	Punjab			
Sanand	SAU	Gujarat			
Sanaura	SWU				
Sanawad	SWD	Madhya Pradesh	Western	200 m	
Sanchi	SCI	Madhya Pradesh			
Sandal Kalan	SLKN	Haryana			
Sandila	SAN				
Sanathnagar	SNF				
Sandhurst Road	SNRD	Maharashtra	CR/Central/Harbour		
Saneh Road	SNX				
Sangar	SGRR	Jammu and Kashmir	NR/Northern	450 m	
Sanganapur	SNGR				
Sanganer	SNGN				
Sangaria	SGRA				
Sangat	SGF				
Sangli	SLI	Maharashtra			
Sangameshwar Road	SGR	Maharashtra	KR / Konkan Railway	37 m	
Sangola	SGLA				
Sangrampur	SNU				
Sangrana Sahib	SBS				
Sangrur	SAG	Punjab			
Sanichara	SAC				
Sanjan	SJN				
Sankarankovil	SNKL	Tamil Nadu			
SankariDurg	SGE	Tamil Nadu			
Shankarpur	SNQ	Jharkhand	Eastern Railways	235	
Sankval	SKVL				
Sanosara Nandra	SNSR				
Sanosra	SOA				
Sanpada		Maharashtra	Harbour/Trans-Harbour (CR)		
Sant Road	SAT				
Santacruz	STC	Maharashtra	WR/Western/Harbour (CR)		
Santaldih	SNTD				
Santalpur	SNLR				
Santragachi Junction	SRC				
Santir Bazar	SNTBR	Tripura	Northeast Frontier	44 m	
Sanvordam Curchorem	DCR	Goa			
Sanvatsar	SNVR				
Sanvrad	SVO				
Sapatgram	SPX	Assam	NFR/Northeast Frontier	45 m	
Saphale	SAH	Maharashtra	WR/Western		
Saradhna	SDH				
Sarai Chandi	SYC				
Sarai Harkhu	SVZ				
Sarai Kansrai	SQN				
Sarai Mir	SMZ				
Sarai Rani	RKS				
Sarangpur	SFW				
Sardarnagar	SANR				
Sardarshahr	SRDR				
Sardiha	SUA	West Bengal	South Eastern		
Sareigram	SGAM				
Sareri	SSR				
Sarkoni	SIQ				
Sarnath	SRNT				
Sarojini Nagar	SOJ				
Sarola	SRL				
Sarotra Road	SZA				
Sarsawa	SSW				
Sarupathar	SZR				
Sarwari	SVD				
Sasan Gir	SASG				
Sasaram Junction	SSM	Bihar			
Sasni	SNS				
Satadhar	STDR				
Satara	STR	Maharashtra			
Sathajagat	STJT				
Sathiaon	SAA				
Sathin Road	SWF				
Satna	STA	Madhya Pradesh			
Satnali	STNL				
Satsang Nagar	SSNR	Jharkhand	Jharkhand	253	
Satuna	SCO				
Satur	SRT	Tamil Nadu			
Saugor (Sagar)	SGO	Madhya Pradesh			
Savarda	SVX				
Savarkundla	SVKD				
Savda	SAV				
Sawai Madhopur	SWM	Rajasthan			
Sawai Madhopur Junction	SWMM	Uttar Pradesh			
Sawantwadi Road	SWV	Maharashtra			
Sealdah	SDAH	West Bengal			
Seawoods-Darave-Karave	SWDK	Maharashtra	Harbour (CR)		
Secunderabad Junction	SC	Telangana			
Sehore	SEH	Madhya Pradesh			
Sehramau	SW				
Selu	SELU	Maharashtra			
Semarkheri	SRKI				
Senapura	SEN	Karnataka	KRCL		
Senchoa Junction	SCE	Assam	Northeast Frontier	63 m	
Sendra	SEU				
Sengottai	SCT	Tamil Nadu			
Seohara	SEO				
Seoraphuli	SHE	West Bengal			
Seram	SEM	Karnataka			
Serampore	SRP	West Bengal			
Settihally	SET				
Sevagram	SEGM	Maharashtra			
Sevaliya	SVL				
Sewapuri	SWPR				
Sewri	SVE	Maharashtra	Harbour (CR)		
Shadhoragaon	SHDR				
Shahabad	SDB	Karnataka			
Shahad	SHAD	Maharashtra	CR/Central		
Saharsa Junction	SHS	Bihar			
Shahbad Markanda	SHDM	Haryana			
Shahbad Mohammadpur					
Shahdol	SDL	Madhya Pradesh			
Shahganj Junction	SHG	Uttar Pradesh			
Shahjehanpur	SPN	Uttar Pradesh			
Shahpur Patoree	SPP	Bihar			
Shahzad Nagar	SAR				
Shajahanpur court	SXK	Uttar Pradesh			
Shajapur	SFY	Madhya Pradesh			
Shakti Nagar	SKTN	Uttar Pradesh			
Shakurbasti	SSB	Delhi			
Shambhupura	SMP				
Shamgarh	SGZ	Madhya Pradesh			
Shamlaji Road	SJS				
Shankargarh	SRJ				
Shankarpalli	SKP	Telangana			
Shantipur	STB				
Shapur Sorath Junction	SHH				
Sharma	SHRM				
SHDSPRA_PADMPRA	SAS				
Shedbal	SED				
Shegaon	SEG	Maharashtra			
Sheikpura	SHK				
Shelu		Maharashtra	CR/Central		
Shendri	SEI				
Shenoli	SNE				
Sheo Singh Pura	SHNX				
Sheopur Kalan	SOE	Madhya Pradesh	North Central	231 m	
Sherekan	SRKN				
Shertalai	SRTL				
Shikohabad Junction	SKB	Uttar Pradesh			
Shimla	SML	Himachal Pradesh			
Shimoga	SME	Karnataka			
Shimoga Town	SMET				
Shirdi (Sainagar Shirdi)	SNSI	Maharashtra			
Shrivagilu	SVGL	Karnataka	SWR		
Shiroor	SHMI				
Shirravde	SIW				
Shirsoli	SS				
Shisho	SHEO	Bihar	East Central Railway	56 m	
Shiupur	SOP				
Shivamogga		Karnataka			
Shivarampur	WSC				
Shivnagar	SHNG				
Shivni Shivapur	SVW	Maharashtra			
Shivpuri	SVPI	Madhya Pradesh			
Shivrampur	SWC				
Shivaji Bridge	CSB	Delhi			
Shoghi	SGS				
Shohratgarh	SOT				
Sholapur CB	SURC	Maharashtra			
Sholavandan	SDN	Tamil Nadu			
Sholinghur	SHU	Tamil Nadu			
Shoranur Junction	SRR	Kerala			
Shravanabelagola	SBGA	Karnataka			
Shri Amirgadh	SIM	Gujarat			
Shri Ganganagar	SGNR	Rajasthan			
Shri Karanpur	SRW				
Shri Madhopur	SMPR				
Shri Mahabirji	SMBJ	Rajasthan			
Shri Mata Vaishno Devi Katra	SVDK	Jammu and Kashmir	NR/Northern	813 m	
Shridham	SRID	Madhya Pradesh			
Shrigonda Road	SGND	Maharashtra			
Shrikalyanpura	SKPA				
ShriKshetra Nagzari	NGZ	Maharashtra			
Shrirajnagar	SAGR				
Shrirangapattana	S	Karnataka			
Shrivagilu	SVGL				
Shujaatpur	SJT				
Shujalpur	SJP				
Shyamnagar	SNR	West Bengal			
Siajuli	SWJ				
Sibsagar Town	SRTN	Assam	Northeast Frontier	n/a	
Siddhpur	SID	Gujarat			
Sidhauli	SD	Uttar Pradesh	North Eastern	138 m	
Sidmukh	SDMK				
Sihapar	SIPR				
Siho	SIHO				
Sihor	SOJN	Gujarat			
Sihora Road	SHR				
Sikandarpur	SKQ				
Sikandra Rao	SKA				
Sikar Junction	SIKR	Rajasthan			
Sikir	SFK				
Silanibari	SOB				
Silao	SILO				
Silapathar	SPTR	Assam	NFR/Northeast Frontier		
Silaut	SLT				
Silchar	SCL	Assam	NFR/Northeast Frontier	26 m	
Siliguri Junction	SGUJ	West Bengal			
Siliguru Town	SGUT				
Silli	SLF	Jharkhand			
Simaluguri Junction	SLGR	Assam			
Simaria	SAE				
Simbhooli	SMBL				
Simen Chapari	SMCP				
Simhachalam	SCM	Andhra Pradesh			
Simlagarh	SLG				
Simultala	STL				
Simurali	SMX	West Bengal			
Sindhudurg	SNDD	Maharashtra			
Sindi	SNI	Maharashtra			
Sindkheda	SNK	Maharashtra			
Sindpan	SDPN				
Sindri Town	SNDT				
Sindurwa	SYW				
Singanallur(Coimbatore)	SHIN	Tamil Nadu			
Singaperumal Koil	SKL	Tamil Nadu			
Singapur Road	SPRD	Andhra Pradesh			
Singarayakonda	SKM	Andhra Pradesh			
Singareni Colleries	SYI	Telangana			
Singarpur	SNPR				
Singrauli	SGRL	Madhya Pradesh			
Singwal	SGW				
Sini Junction	SINI	Jharkhand			
Sion	SIN	Maharashtra	CR/Central		
Siras	SRAS				
Sirathu	SRO				
Sirhind Junction	SIR	Punjab			
Sirkazhi	SY	Tamil Nadu			
Sirli	SIF				
Sirohi Road	SOH	Rajasthan			
Sirpur Kaghaznagar	SKZR	Telangana			
Sirpur Town	SRUR	Telangana			
Sirran	SIRN				
Sirsa	SSA	Haryana			
Sisarka	SSKA				
Sisvinhalli	SVHE				
Siswa Bazar	SBZ				
Sitamarhi	SMI	Bihar			
Sitapur Junction	STP	Uttar Pradesh	NER/North Eastern	142 m	
Sitapur Cantonment	SCC	Uttar Pradesh	NER/North Eastern	142 m	
Sitapur City Junction	SPC	Uttar Pradesh	NR/Northern	140 m	
Sitarampur	STN				
Sithalavai	SEV				
Sithouli	STLI				
Sitimani	SII				
Sivaganga	SVGA	Tamil Nadu			
Sivajinagar	SVJR	Maharashtra	Central	552 m	
Sivakasi	SVKS	Tamil Nadu			
Sivarakottai	SVK	Tamil Nadu			
Siwaith	SWE				
Siwan Junction	SV	Bihar			
Siwani	SWNI	Haryana			
Sodepur	SEP	West Bengal			
Sogariya	SGAC	Rajasthan	WCR/Western Central		
Sohagpur	SGP	Madhya Pradesh			
Sohwal	SLW				
Sojat Road	SOD	Rajasthan			
Sojitra	SJTR				
Solan	SOL	Himachal Pradesh			
Solan Brewery	SBY				
Solapur Junction	SUR	Maharashtra			
Solapur Junction	SURM	Maharashtra			
Somanur	SNO	Tamil Nadu			
Somesar	SOS				
Somna	SOM				
Somnath	SMNH	Gujarat			
Sompeta	SPT	Andhra Pradesh			
Son Nagar	SEB	Bihar			
Sonagir	SOR				
Sonarpur Junction	SPR	West Bengal	ER/Eastern Railway		
Sondha Road	SCN				
Sonegaon	SNN				
Songadh	SGD				
Soni	SONI				
Sonik	SIC				
Sonipat Junction	SNP	Haryana	Northern Railways		
Sonpur Junction	SEE	Bihar			
Sonwara	SWO				
Sopur	SXZM	Jammu and Kashmir	NR/Northern	1594 m	
Sorbhog Junction	SBE	Assam	NFR/Northeast Frontier	52 m	
Sorupeta	SPQ	Assam	NFR/Northeast Frontier	47 m	
Soro	SORO	Odisha			
Soron Shukar Kshetra	SRNK	Uttar Pradesh	North Eastern Railway zone		
Sri Dungargarh	SDGH	Rajasthan			
Sri Kalahasti	KHT	Andhra Pradesh			
Srikakulam Road	CHE	Andhra Pradesh	EcoR/East Coast Railway		
Srikrishna Nagar	SKN				
Srinagar	SINA	Jammu and Kashmir	NR/Northern	1583 m	
Sriramnagar	SRNR	Andhra Pradesh			
Srirampur, Assam	SRPB	Assam	NFR/Northeast Frontier	50 m	
Srirangam	SRGM	Tamil Nadu			
Srivaikuntam	SVV	Tamil Nadu			
Srivilliputtur	SVPR	Tamil Nadu			
St. Thomas Mount	STM	Tamil Nadu			
Subansiri	SUZ				
Subedarganj	SFG				
Subrahmanya Road railway station	SBHR	Karnataka	SWR		
Subzi Mandi	SZM	Delhi			
Suchindram	SCH	Tamil Nadu			
Sudsar	SDF	Rajasthan			
Sujangarh	SUJH				
Sujanpur	SJNP				
Sukhisewaniyan	SUW				
Sukhpar Roha	SRHA				
Sukhpur	SUKP				
Sukritipur	SQF	Assam	NFR/Northeast Frontier	24 m	
Suladhal	SUL				
Sulah Himachal Pradesh	SLHP	Himachal Pradesh			
Sulgare	SGRE				
Sullurupeta	SPE	Andhra Pradesh			
Sultanganj	SGG				
Sultanpur	SLN				
Sultanpur Lodi	SQR				
Sulur Road (Coimbatore)	SUU	Tamil Nadu			
Sumer	SUMR				
Summadevi	SUDV				
Summer Hill	SHZ				
Sumreri	SMRR				
Sunam	SFM	Punjab			
SundaraperumalKoil	SPL	Tamil Nadu			
Sunderabad	SNBD				
Sundlak	SDLK				
Supaul	SOU	Bihar			
Suraimanpur	SIP				
Surajgarh	SRGH				
Surajpur	SUPR	Chhattisgarh			
Surajpur Road	SJQ				
Surat	ST	Gujarat	WR/Western Railway		
Suratgarh Junction	SOG	Rajasthan			
Surathkal	SL	Karnataka	KRCL		
Suravali	SRVX				
Sureli	SURL				
Surendranagar	SUNR	Gujarat			
Suriyawan	SAW				
Surla Road	SLRD	Odisha			
Surpura	SPO				
Suwansa	SWS				
Suwasra	SVA				
Swamimalai	SWI	Tamil Nadu			
Swarupganj	SRPJ				
Sanjuje Da Arey]	SJDA	Goa	SWR	17	
Sankval	SKVL	Goa	SWR	26	
Sonalium	LIM	Goa	SWR	170	
Suravali	SRVX	Goa	KRCL	19	

== T ==
List of Indian Railways stations whose names start with 'T'

Station name	Station code	State	Railway zone	Elevation	Map
Tadali	TAE	Maharashtra			
Tadepalligudem	TDD	Andhra Pradesh	SCR/South Central		
Tadipatri	TU	Andhra Pradesh	SCR/South Central		
Tadwal	TVL	Maharashtra			
Tahsil Bhadra	TSD	Rajasthan			
Tahsil Fatehpur	TSF	Uttar Pradesh			
Tajpur	TJP	Madhya Pradesh			
Tajpur Dehma	TJD	Uttar Pradesh			
Takal	TAKL	Maharashtra			
Takari	TKR	Maharashtra			
Takarkhede	TKHE	Maharashtra			
Takia	TQA	Uttar Pradesh			
Takkolam	TKO	Tamil Nadu			
Taksal	TSL	Himachal Pradesh			
Taku	TAKU	Madhya Pradesh			
Talaiyuthu	TAY	Tamil Nadu			
Talara	TLRA	Himachal Pradesh			
Talakhajuri	TLKH	Uttar Pradesh			
Talala Junction	TAV	Gujarat			
Talvadiya Junction	TLZ	Madhya Pradesh	West Central	308 m	
Talbahat	TBT	Uttar Pradesh			
Talcher	TLHR	Odisha			
Talchhapar	TLC	Rajasthan			
Talegaon Dabhade	TGN	Maharashtra			
Talguppa	TLGP	Karnataka			
Talheri Buzurg	THJ	Uttar Pradesh			
Talli Saidasahu	TSS	Punjab			
Talod	TOD	Gujarat			
Taloja		Maharashtra	CR/Central		
Talwandi	TWB	Punjab			
Tambaram	TBM	Tamil Nadu			
Tambaram Sanatorium	TBMS	Tamil Nadu			
Tamkuhi Road	TOI	Uttar Pradesh			
Tamluk	TMZ	West Bengal	SER/South Eastern		
Tamuriya	TMA	Bihar			
Tanakpur	TPU	Uttarakhand			
Tanda Urmar	TDO	Punjab			
Tandur railway station	TDU	Telangana			
Tangla	TNL	Assam			
Tangra	TRA	West Bengal			
Tankuppa	TKN				
Tanuku	TNKU	Andhra Pradesh			
Tanur	TA	Kerala			
Tapa	TAPA	Punjab			
Tapri	TPZ	Uttar Pradesh			
Tarabari	TRBE	Assam	NFR/Northeast Frontier	69 m	
Taradevi	TVI				
Tarak Nagar	TNX				
Taramani	TMN	Tamil Nadu			
Tarana Road	TAN				
Taranga Hill	TRAH				
Taraori	TRR	Haryana			
Taregna	TEA				
Targaon	TAZ				
Tarighat	TRG				
Tarlupadu	TRL				
Tarn Taran	TTO	Punjab			
Tarsai	TRSR				
Tarsari Muria	TRSR				
Tatanagar Junction	TATA	Jharkhand			
Tatibahar	TBH				
Tatisilwai	TIS	Jharkhand			
Teghra	TGA				
Teharka	TKA				
Telam	TQM				
Telwa bazar	TLB	Bihar			
Tellicherry	TLY	Kerala			
Tenali Junction	TEL	Andhra Pradesh			
Theni	TENI	Tamil Nadu			
Tenkasi	TSI	Tamil Nadu			
Tenmalai	TML	Tamil Nadu			
Tetelia	TTLA	Assam	NFR/Northeast Frontier	57 m	
Tetulmari	TET				
Tezpore	TZTB	Assam			
Thakurkuchi	TKC	Assam	NFR/Northeast Frontier	80 m	
Thakurli		Maharashtra	CR/Central		
Than Junction	THAN	Gujarat			
Thana Bihpur Junction	THB	Bihar			
Thandla Rd	THDR	Madhya Pradesh			
Thane	TNA	Maharashtra	CR/Central/Trans-Harbour		
Thanjavur Junction	TJ	Tamil Nadu	SR/Southern Railway	62 m	
Thathana Mithri	THMR				
Thawe Junction	THE	Maharashtra			
Thekeraguri	TGE	Assam	NFR/Northeast Frontier	64 m	
Therubali	THV	Odisha			
Thrissur	TCR	Kerala			
Trivandrum Central	TVC	Kerala			
Thirumullaivoyal	TMVL	Tamil Nadu	SR/Southern	21.73 m	
Thiruninravur	TI	Tamil Nadu	SR/Southern	37 m	
Thiruvananthapuram Pettah	TVP	Kerala			
Thiruvarur Junction	TVR	Tamil Nadu			
Thivim railway station	THVM	Goa	KRCL	23	
Thokur	TOK	Karnataka			
Thuria, India	THUR				
Tibi	TIBI	Rajasthan			
Tihu	TIHU	Assam	NFR/Northeast Frontier	46 m	
Tikaria	TKYR				
Tikekarwadi	TKKD				
Tikunia	TQN				
Tilak Bridge	TKJ	Delhi			
Tilak Nagar	TKNG	Maharashtra	Harbour (CR)		
Tilaru	TIU	Andhra Pradesh			
Tilaiya	TIA	Bihar			
Tilda	TLD	Chhattisgarh			
Tilhar	TLH				
Tilrath	TIL				
Tilwara	TWL				
Timarni	TBN	Madhya Pradesh			
Timba Road	TBA				
Timmapur	TMX	Andhra Pradesh			
Tinai Ghat	TGT				
Tindivanam	TMV	Tamil Nadu			
Tinpahar Junction	TPH	Jharkhand			
Tinsukia Junction	TSK	Assam			
Tipkai	TPK	Assam	NFR/Northeast Frontier	43 m	
Tipling	TPG				
Tiptur	TTR	Karnataka	SWR		
Tirodi	TRDI	Madhya Pradesh			
Tirora	TRO	Maharashtra			
Tiruchanur	TCNR	Andhra Pradesh			
Tiruchirapalli Fort	TP	Tamil Nadu			
Tiruchirapalli Junction	TPJ	Tamil Nadu	SR/Southern Railway	85 m	
Tiruchendur	TCN	Tamil Nadu	SR/Southern Railway	5m	
Tiruchirapalli Palakkarai	TPE	Tamil Nadu			
Tirukoilur	TRK	Tamil Nadu			
Tirumayilai	MYL	Tamil Nadu			
Tirumalairayanpattinam	TMPT	Puducherry	SR/Southern		
Tirumalpur	TMLP	Tamil Nadu			
Tirumangalam	TMQ	Tamil Nadu			
Tirumayam	TYM	Tamil Nadu			
Tirunagesvaram	TRM	Tamil Nadu			
Tirunelveli Junction	TEN	Tamil Nadu	SR/Southern Railway	45m	
Tirupadripuliyur	TDPR	Tamil Nadu			
Tirupati	TPTY	Andhra Pradesh			
Tiruparankndrm	TDN	Tamil Nadu			
Tirupattur Junction	TPT	Tamil Nadu			
Tiruppappuliyur	CUD	Tamil Nadu			
Tiruppur	TUP	Tamil Nadu			
Tiruppuvanam	TVN	Tamil Nadu			
Tirur	TIR	Kerala	SR/Southern Railway		
Tirusulam	TLM	Tamil Nadu			
Tiruttani	TRT	Tamil Nadu			
Tiruttangal	TTL	Tamil Nadu	SR/Southern	90 m	
Tiruturaipundi Junction	TTP	Tamil Nadu			
Tiruvalam	THL	Tamil Nadu			
Tiruvalangadu	TO	Tamil Nadu			
Tiruvalla	TRVL	Kerala			
Tiruvallur	TRL	Tamil Nadu	SR/Southern	47.46 m	
Tiruvanmiyur	TMU	Tamil Nadu			
Tiruvannamalai railway station	TNM	Tamil Nadu			
Tiruverumbur	TRB	Tamil Nadu			
Tiruvidaimarudur	TDR	Tamil Nadu			
Tiruvottiyur	TVT	Tamil Nadu	SR/Southern	7 m	
Tisi	TISI	Maharashtra			
Tisua	TSA	Uttar Pradesh			
Titabar	TTB	Assam			
Titlagarh	TGH	West Bengal			
Titlagarh Junction	TIG	Odisha	ECoR/East Coast		
Titwala	TL	Maharashtra	CR/Central		
Tivari	TIW	Rajasthan			
Todarpur	TDP	Uttar Pradesh			
Tohana	TUN	Haryana			
Toranagallu	TNGL	Karnataka	SWR/South Western		
Tori	TORI	Jharkhand			
Trichur	TCR	Kerala			
Trikarpur	TKQ	Kerala			
Trilochan Mahdo	TLMD	Uttar Pradesh			
Triplicane	TPQ	Tamil Nadu			
Tripunittura	TRTR	Kerala			
Tondiarpet	TNP	Tamil Nadu	SR/Southern	5 m	
Tsunduru	TSR	Andhra Pradesh			
Tughlakabad	TKD	Delhi			
Tukaithad	TTZ	Maharashtra			
Tulsipur	TLR	Uttar Pradesh			
Tulwara Jhil	TLI	Rajasthan			
Tumkur	TK	Karnataka			
Tumsar Road	TMR	Maharashtra			
Tundla Junction	TDL	Uttar Pradesh			
Tuni	TUNI	Andhra Pradesh			
Turbhe	TUH	Maharashtra	Trans-Harbour (CR)		
Turtipar	TTI	Uttar Pradesh			
Tuti-Melur	TME	Tamil Nadu	Southern Railway		
Tuticorin	TN	Tamil Nadu	Southern Railway		
Tuwa	TUWA	Gujarat			
Twining Ganj	TWG	Bihar			
Tada	TXD	Andhra Pradesh			

== U ==
List of Indian Railways stations whose names start with 'U'

Station name	Station code	State	Railway zone	Elevation	Map
Ubarni	UBN	Uttar Pradesh	NR/Northern		
Uchana	UCA	Haryana	NR/Northern		
Uchippuli	UCP	Tamil Nadu	SR/Southern		
Udagamandalam	UAM	Tamil Nadu	SR/Southern		
Udaipur City	UDZ	Rajasthan	NWR/North Western	582 m	
Udaipur Khurd Halt	UDKN	Tripura	NER/North Eastern	182 m	
Udaipur Tripura	UDPU	Tripura	NEFR/Northeast Frontier	19 m	
Udaipura	UDPR	Uttar Pradesh	NCR/North Central	331 m	
Udairampur	URP	West Bengal	ER/Eastern	331 m	
Udalguri	ULG	Assam	NEFR/North East Frontier		
Udalkachar	UKR	Madhya Pradesh	SECR/South East Central		
Udasar	UDS	Rajasthan	North Western		
Udgir	UDGR	Maharashtra	SCR/South Central		
Udhampur	UHP	Jammu & Kashmir	NR/Northern	660 m	
Udhna Junction	UDN	Gujarat	WR/Western		
Udramsar	UMS	Rajasthan	NWR/North West		
Udupi	UD	Karnataka	SWR/South West		
Udvada	UVD	Gujarat	WR/Western		
Udwantnagar Halt	UWNR	Bihar	ECR/East Central		
Udyankheri	UDK	Madhya Pradesh	WC/West Central		
Ugaon	UGN	Maharashtra	CR/Central		
Ugar Khurd	UGR	Karnataka	SWR/South Western		
Ugarpur	UGP	Uttar Pradesh	NCR/North Central		
Ugna Halt	UGNA	Bihar	ECR/East Central		
Ugrasenpur	URPR	Uttar pradesh	NR/Northern		
Ugu	UGU	Uttar Pradesh	NR/Northern		
Ugwe	UGWE	Maharashtra	SCR/South Central		
Ujalvav	UJ	Gujarat	WR/Western		
Ujhani	UJH	Uttar Pradesh	NER/North East		
Ujiarpur	UJP	Bihar	ECR/East Central		
Ujjain Junction	UJN	Madhya Pradesh	WR/Western	493 m	
Ukai Songadh	USD	Gujarat	WR/Western		
Ukhali	UKH	Maharashtra	SCR/South Central		
Ukhra	UKA	West Bengal	ER/Eastern		
Ukilerhat Halt	UKLH	West Bengal	ER/Eastern		
Uklana	UKN	Haryana	NR/Northern		
Ukshi	UKC	Maharashtra	KR/Konkan		
Ulavapadu	UPD	Andhra Pradesh	SCR/South Central		
Ulhasnagar	ULNR	Maharashtra	CR/Central		
Ulindakonda	UKD	Andhra Pradesh	SCR/South Central		
Ullal	ULL	Karnataka	SR/Southern		
Ulnabhari	ULL	Uttar Pradesh	NR/Northern		
Ulubaria	ULB	West Bengal	SER/South Eastern		
Ulundurpet	ULU	Tamil Nadu	SR/Southern		
Umar Tali	UTA	Uttar Pradesh	NR/Northern		
Umardashi	UM	Gujarat	Western		
Umaria	UMR	Madhya Pradesh	SECR/South East Central		
Umariaispah Halt	UIH	Madhya Pradesh	SECR/South East Central		
Umarpada	UMPD	Gujarat	WR/Western		
Umargam Road	UBR	Gujarat	WR/Western		
Umda Nagar	UR	Andhra Pradesh	SCR/South Central		
Umed	UMED	Rajasthan	NWR/North Western		
Umeshnagar	UMNR	Bihar	ECR/East Central		
Umra	UMRA	Rajasthan	NWR/North Western		
Umranala	ULA	Madhya Pradesh	SECR/South East Central		
Umram	UMM	Andhra Pradesh	SCR/South Central		
Umred	URR	Maharashtra	SECR/South East Central		
Umreth	UMH	Gujarat	WR/Western		
Umri	UMRI	Maharashtra	SCR/South Central		
Umroli	UOI	Maharashtra	WR/Western		
Una	UNA	Gujarat	WR/Western		
Una Himachal	UHL	Himachal Pradesh	NR/Northern		
Unai Vansada Rd	UN	Gujarat	WR/Western		
Unaula	UNLA	Uttar Pradesh	NER/North Eastern		
Unchahar Junction	UCR	Uttar Pradesh	NR/Northern		
Unchaulia	UCH	Uttar Pradesh	NR/North		
Unchdih	UND	Uttar Pradesh	NCR/North Central		
Unchhera	UHR	Madhya Pradesh	WCR/West Central		
Unchi Bassi	UCB	Punjab	NR/Northern		
Undasa Madhawpu	UDM	Madhya Pradesh	WR/Western		
Undi	UNDI	Andhra Pradesh	SCR/South Central		
Unguturu	VGT	Andhra Pradesh	SCR/South Central		
Unhel	UNL	Madhya Pradesh	WR/Western		
Unjalur	URL	Tamil Nadu	SR/Southern		
Unjha	UJA	Gujarat	WR/Western		
Unkal	UNK	Uttar Pradesh	SWR/South Western		
Unnao Junction	ON	Uttar Pradesh	NR/Northern		
Untare Road	URD	Jharkhand	ECR/East Central		
Uplai	UPI	Maharashtra	CR/Central		
Upleta	UA	Gujarat	WR/Western		
Uppal	OPL	Telangana	SCR/South Central		
Uppala	UAA	Kerala	SR/Southern		
Uppalavai	UPW	Telangana	SCR/South Central		
Uppalur	UPL	Andhra Pradesh	SCR/South Central		
Uppuguda	HPG	Andhra Pradesh	SCR/South Central		
Uppugunduru	UGD	Andhra Pradesh	SCR/South Central		
Urapakkam	UPM	Tamil Nadu	SR/Southern		
Urdauli	UDX	Uttar Pradesh	NER/North Eastern		
Uren	UREN	Bihar	ER/Eastern		
Urga	URGA	Chhattisgarh	SECR/South East Central		
Urkura	URK	Chhattisgarh	SECR/South East Central		
Urlam	ULM	Andhra Pradesh	ECoR/East Coastal		
Urma	URMA	West Bengal	SER/South Eastern		
Uruli	URI	Maharashtra	CR/Central		
Usalapur	USL	Chhattisgarh	SECR/South East Central		
Usia Khas	USK	Bihar	ECR/East Central		
Uska Bazar	UB	Uttar Pradesh	NER/North East		
Usmanpur	UPR	Maharashtra	SCR/South Central		
Usra	USRA	Gujarat	WR/Western		
Utarlai	UTL	Rajasthan	NWR/West Western		
Utarsanda	UTD	Gujarat	WR/Western		
Utraitia Jn	UTR	Uttar Pradesh	NER/North Eastern		
Utran	URN	Gujarat	WR/Western		
Utripura	UTP	Uttar Pradesh	NER/North Eastern		
Uttamarkovil	UKV	Tamil Nadu	SR/Southern		
Uttangal Mangalam	UMG	Tamil Nadu	SR/Southern		
Uttar Radhanagar Halt	UTN	West Bengal	ER/Eastern		
Uttarpara	UPA	West Bengal	ER/Eastern		
Uttukuli	UKL	Tamil Nadu	SR/Southern		
Udumalpettai	UDT	Tamil Nadu	SR/Southern		

== V ==
List of Indian Railways stations whose names start with 'V'

Station name	Station code	State	Railway zone	Elevation	Map
V.O.C. Nagar	VOC	Tamil Nadu	SR/Southern		
Vachaspati Nagar	VPH	Bihar	ECR/East Central		
Vadaj	VRJ	Gujarat	WR/Western		
Vadakara	BDJ	Kerala	SR/Southern		
Vadal	VAL	Gujarat	WR/Western	86 m	
Vadali	VAE	Gujarat	WR/Western		
Vadali Luter Road	VLTR	Gujarat	WR/Western		
Vadalur	VLU	Tamil Nadu	SR/Southern		
Vadamadura	VDM	Tamil Nadu	SR/Southern		
Vadanam Kurussi Halt	VDKS	Kerala	SR/Southern		
Vadgaon	VDN	Maharashtra	CR/Central		
Vadgaon Nila	VDGN	Maharashtra	SCR/South Central		
Vadhvana	VAN	Gujarat	WR/Western		
Vadippatti	VDP	Tamil Nadu	SR/Southern		
Vadiya Devli	VDV	Gujarat	WR/Western		
Vadlamannadu	VMD	Andhra Pradesh	SCR/South Central		
Vadnagar	VDG	Gujarat	WR/Western	156 m	
Vadod	VXD	Gujarat	WR/Western		
Vadodara Junction	BRC	Gujarat	WR/Western	37 m	
Vadtal Swaminarayan	VTL	Gujarat	WR/Western		
Vadviyala	VVL	Gujarat	WR/Western		
Vagdiya	VD	Gujarat	WR/Western		
Vaghli	VGL	Maharashtra	CR/Central		
Vaibhavwadi Road	VBW	Maharashtra	KR/Konkan		
Vaikom Road	VARD	Kerala	SR/Southern		
Vailapuzha	VPZ	Kerala	SR/Southern		
Vaitarna	VTN	Maharashtra	WR/Western		
Vaitheeswaran Koil	VDL	Tamil Nadu	SR/Southern		
Vakav	WKA	Maharashtra	CR/Central		
Valadar	VLDR	Gujarat	WR/Western		
Valadi	VLDE	Tamil Nadu	SR/Southern		
Valantaravai	VTV	Tamil Nadu	SR/Southern		
Valapattanam	VAPM	Kerala	SR/Southern		
Valappadi G Halt	VGE	Tamil Nadu	SR/Southern		
Valaramanikkam	VMM	Tamil Nadu	SR/Southern		
Valathoor	VLT	Tamil Nadu	SR/Southern		
Valavanur	VRA	Tamil Nadu	SR/Southern		
Valha	WLH	Maharashtra	CR/Central		
Valivade	VV	Maharashtra	CR/Central		
Vallabhnagar	VBN	Rajasthan	NWR/North Western	489 m	
Vallabh Vidyanagar	VLYN	Gujarat	WR/Western	39 m	
Vallampadugai	VMP	Tamil Nadu	SR/Southern		
Vallathol Nagar	VTK	Kerala	SR/Southern		
Vallikkunnu	VLI	Kerala	SR/Southern		
Valliveedu	VLV	Andhra Pradesh	SCR/South Central		
Valliyur	VLY	Tamil Nadu	SR/Southern		
Valmikinagar Road	VKNR	Bihar	ECR/East Central		
Valsad	BL	Gujarat	WR/Western		
Valyampatti	VPJ	Tamil Nadu	SR/Southern		
Vambori	VBR	Maharashtra	CR/Central		
Vandalur	VDR	Tamil Nadu	SR/Southern		
Vangani	VGI	Maharashtra	CR/Central		
Vanganur	VRN	Andhra Pradesh	SCR/South Central		
Vangaon	VGN	Maharashtra	WR/Western		
Vangal	VGL	Tamil Nadu	SR/Southern		
Vani Road	VNRD	Gujarat	WR/Western		
Vanigonda	VLG	Andhra Pradesh	SCR/South Central		
Vaniyambadi	VN	Tamil Nadu	SR/Southern		
Vaniyambadi	VN	Tamil Nadu	SR/Southern		
Vaniyambalam	VNB	Kerala	SR/Southern		
Vanji Maniyachi Junction	MEJ	Tamil Nadu	SR/Southern		
Vankal	VKL	Gujarat	WR/Western		
Vapi	VAPI	Gujarat	WR/Western		
Varahi	VRX	Gujarat	WR/Western		
Varakalpattu	VKP	Tamil Nadu	SR/Southern		
Varanasi City	BCY	Uttar Pradesh	NER/North Eastern	76 m	
Varanasi Junction	BSB	Uttar Pradesh	NER/ Northern Eastern	82 m	
Varangaon	VNA	Maharashtra	CR/Central		
Varediya	VRE	Gujarat	WR/Western		
Varkala	VAK	Kerala	SR/Southern	58 m	
Varkhedi	VRKD	Maharashtra	CR/Central		
Varnama	VRM	Gujarat	WR/Western		
Vartej	VTJ	Gujarat	WR/Western		
Varvala	VVA	Gujarat	WR/Western		
Vasad Junction	VDA	Gujarat	WR/Western		
Vasai Road	BSR	Maharashtra	WR/Western		
Vasan Iyawa	WSE	Gujarat	WR/Western		
Vasco da Gama railway station	VSG	Goa	SWR		
Vashi	V	Maharashtra	Harbour/Trans-Harbour (CR)		
Vasind	VSD	Maharashtra	CR/Central		
Vaso	VASO	Gujarat	WR/Western		
Vastrapur	VTP	Gujarat	WR/Western		
Vatluru	VAT	Andhra Pradesh	SCR/South Central		
Vatva	VTA	Gujarat	WR/ Western		
Vavdi	VVD	Gujarat	WR/Western		
Vavdi Khurd	VKG	Gujarat	WR/Western		
Vavera	VVV	Gujarat	WR/Western		
Vayalar	VAY	Kerala	SR/Southern		
Vayalpad	VLD	Andhra Pradesh	SCR/South Central		
Vazeerpur Halt	ZPH	Uttar Pradesh	NER/North Eastern		
Vedaranniyam	VDY	Tamil Nadu			
Vedayapalem	VDE	Andhra Pradesh	SCR/South Central		
Vedchha	VDH	Gujarat	WR/Western		
Veer	VEER	Maharashtra	KR / Konkan	6 m	
Vejalka	VJK	Gujarat	WR/Western		
Vejendla	VJA	Andhra Pradesh	SCR/South Central		
Velachery	VLCY	Tamil Nadu	SR/Southern		
Velaccha	VLC	Gujarat	WR/Western		
Velankanni	VLNK	Tamil Nadu	SR/Southern		
Veldurti	VDI	Andhra Pradesh	SCR/South Central		
Vellanur	VEL	Tamil Nadu	SR/Southern		
Vellarakkad	VEK	Kerala	SR/Southern		
Vellayil	VLL	Kerala	SR/Southern		
Vellipalayem	VXM	Tamil Nadu	SR/Southern		
Velliyani	VEI	Tamil Nadu	SR/Southern		
Vellodu	VO	Tamil Nadu	SR/Southern		
Vellore Cantonment	VLR	Tamil Nadu	SR/Southern		
Vellore Town	VT	Tamil Nadu	SR/Southern		
Vellur Halt	VER	Tamil Nadu	SR/Southern		
Velpuru	VPU	Andhra Pradesh	SCR/South Central		
Velpuru Road	VEP	Andhra Pradesh	SCR/South Central		
Vemuru	VMU	Andhra Pradesh	SCR/South Central		
Vendodu	VDD	Andhra Pradesh	SCR/South Central		
Vendra	VND	Andhra Pradesh	SCR/South Central		
Venkatachalam	VKT	Andhra Pradesh	SCR/South Central		
Venkatagiri	VKI	Andhra Pradesh	SCR/South Central		
Venkatagiri Kote Halt	VTE/H	Karnataka	SWR/South Western		
Venkatampalli	VPL	Andhra Pradesh	SCR/South Central		
Venkatanarashimarajuvaripeta	VKZ	Andhra Pradesh	SR/Southern	126 m	
Venkatnagar	VKR	Madhya Pradesh	SECR/South East Central		
Ventraptagada	VPG	Andhra Pradesh	SCR/South Central		
Vepagunta	VGA	Andhra Pradesh	SR/Southern		
Veppampattu	VEU	Tamil Nadu	SR/Southern		
Veraval	VRL	Gujarat	WR/Western		
Verka Junction	VKA	Punjab	NR/Northern		
Verna railway station	VEN	Goa	KRCL	9 m	
Vetapalemu	VTM	Andhra Pradesh	SCR/South Central		
Vidisha	BHS	Madhya Pradesh	WCR/West Central		
Vidhraswattha	VWA	Karnataka	SWR/South Western		
Vidya Nagar	VAR	Andhra Pradesh	SCR/South Central		
Vidyapatinagar	VPN	Bihar	ECR/East Central		
Vidyasagar	VDS	Jharkhand	ER/Eastern		
Vidyavihar	VVH	Maharashtra	CR/Central		
Vijapur	VJP	Madhya Pradesh	WCR/West Central		
Vijayamangalam	VZ	Tamil Nadu	SR/Southern		
Vijianagar	VJR	Maharashtra	SWR/South Western		
Vijayawada Junction	BZA	Andhra Pradesh	SCR/South Central		
Vijaypur Jammu	VJPJ	Jammu and Kashmir	NR/Northern	355 m	
Vijpadi Road	VJD	Gujarat	WR/Western		
Vikarabad Junction	VKB	Telangana	SCR/South Central		
Vikhran	VKH	Maharashtra	WR/Western		
Vikhroli	VK	Maharashtra	CR/Central		
Vikramgarh Alot	VMA	Madhya Pradesh	WCR/West Central		
Vikramnagar	VRG	Madhya Pradesh	WR/Western		
Vikravandi	VVN	Tamil Nadu	SR/Southern		
Vilad	VL	Maharashtra	CR/Central		
Vilavade	VID	Maharashtra	KR/Konkan		
Vialayatkalan Road	VYK	Madhya Pradesh	SCR/South Central		
Vile Parle	VLP	Maharashtra	WR/Western/Harbour (CR)		
Vilegaon	VLN	Maharashtra	CR/Central		
Villianur	VI	Pondicherry	SR/Southern		
Villivakkam	VLK	Tamil Nadu	SR/Southern	10.25 m	
Villiyambakkam	VB	Tamil Nadu	SR/Southern		
Villuppuram Junction	VM	Tamil Nadu	SR/Southern		
Vindhyachal	BDL	Uttar Pradesh	NCR/North Central		
Vinhere	VINH	Maharashtra	KR/Konkan		
Vinnamangalam	VGM	Tamil Nadu	SR/Southern		
Vinukonda	VKD	Andhra Pradesh	SCR/South Central		
Viramdad	VQD	Gujarat	WR/Western		
Viramgam Junction	VG	Gujarat	WR/Western		
Virani Alur	VRLR	Tamil Nadu	SR/Southern		
Virapandy Road	VRPD	Tamil Nadu	SR/Southern		
Viraput	VP	Andhra Pradesh	SCR/South Central		
Virar	VR	Maharashtra	WR/Western		
Virarakkiyam	VRQ	Tamil Nadu	SR/Southern		
Viravada	VRV	Gujarat	NWR/North Western		
Viravalli	VRVL	Andhra Pradesh	SCR		
Viravasaram	VVM	Andhra Pradesh	SCR/South Central		
Virbhadra	VRH	Uttarakhand	NR/Northern		
Virinchipuram	VJ	Tamil Nadu	SR/Southern		
Virochannagar	VCN	Gujarat	WR/Western		
Virol	VOL	Gujarat	WR/Western		
Virpur	VRR	Gujarat	WR/Western		
Virudunagar Junction	VPT	Tamil Nadu	SR/Southern		
Virul	VUL	Maharashtra	CR/Central		
Visakhapatnam	VSKP	Andhra Pradesh	SCoR/South Coastal	5.97m	
Visapur	VPR	Maharashtra	CR/Central		
Visavadar	VSW	Gujarat	WR/Western		
Vishnupuram	VNUP	Andhra Pradesh	SCR/South Central		
Vishrambag	VRB	Maharashtra	CR/Central		
Vishvamitri	VS/VSI	Gujarat	WR/Western		
Visnagar	VNG	Gujarat	WR/Western		
Viswanath Chrli	VNE	Assam	NFR/Northern Frontier		
Vithalwadi	VLDI	Maharashtra	CR/Central		
Viveka Vihar	VVB	Delhi	NR/Northern		
Vivekanandpuri Halt	VVKP	Delhi	NR/Northern		
Vizianagaram Junction	VZM	Andhra Pradesh	ECoR/East Coastal		
V. O. C. Nagar railway station	VOC	Tamil Nadu	SR/Southern	5 m	
Vondh	VON	Gujarat	WR/Western		
Vriddhachalam Junction	VRI	Tamil nadu	SR/Southern		
Vrindhachalam Town	VRT	Tamil Nadu	SR/Southern		
Vrindaban Road	VRDB	Uttar Pradesh	NCR/North Central		
Vyara	VYA	Gujarat	WR/Western		
Vyasarpadi Jeeva	VJM	Tamil Nadu	SR/Southern	5 m	
Vyasnagar	VYN	Uttar Pradesh	NR/Northern		

== W ==
List of Indian Railways stations whose names start with 'W'

Station name	Station code	State	Railway zone	Elevation	Map
Wadakanchery	WKI	Kerala	SR/Southern		
Wadala Road	BPTW	Maharashtra	Harbour (CR)		
Wadegaon	WDG	Maharashtra	SCR/South East Central		
Wadhwan City	WC	Gujarat	WR/Western		
Wadi Junction	WADI	Karnataka	CR/Central		
Wadiaram	WDR	Telangana	SCR/South Central		
Wadrengdisa	WDA	Assam	NFR/North Fronterior		
Wadsa	WSA	Maharashtra	SECR/South East Central		
Wadsinge	WDS	Maharashtra	CR/Central		
Wadwal Nagnath	WDLN	Maharashtra	SCR/South Central		
Waghai	WGI	Gujarat	WR/Western		
Waghoda	WGA	Madhya Pradesh	CR/Central		
Wair	WAIR	Uttar Pradesh	NCR/North Central		
Walajabad	WJ	Tamil Nadu	SR/Southern		
Walajah Road	WJR	Tamil Nadu	SR/Southern		
Walayar	WRA	Kerala	SR/Southern		
Wan Road	WND	Maharashtra	SCR/South Central		
Wandal	WDL	Karnataka	SWR/South Western		
Wanderjatana	WDJ	Punjab	NR/Northern		
Wanegaon	WNG	Maharashtra	SCR/South Central		
Wangapalli	WP	Andhra Pradesh	SCR/South Central		
Wani	WANI	Maharashtra	CR/Central		
Wankaner City	WKRC	Gujarat	WR/Western		
Wankaner Junction	WKR	Gujarat	WR/Western		
Wanparti Road	WPR	Telangana	SCR/South Central		
Wansjaliya	WSJ	Gujarat	WR/Western		
Warangal	WL	Telangana	SCR/South Central		
Wardha East	WRE	Maharashtra	CR/Central		
Wardha Junction	WR	Maharashtra	CR/Central		
Waria	OYR	West Bengal	ER/Eastern		
Warigaon Newada	WRGN	Uttar Pradesh	NR/Northern		
Waris Aleganj	WRS	Bihar	ECR/East Central		
Warora	WRR	Maharashtra	CR/Central		
Warud	WARUD	Maharashtra	CR/Central		
Warudkhed	WRD	Maharashtra	CR/Central		
Wasanapura	VSP	Maharashtra	CR/Central		
Washermanpet	WST	Tamil Nadu	SR/Southern		
Washim	WHM	Maharashtra	SCR/South Central		
Washimbe	WSB	Maharashtra	CR/Central		
Wasud	WSD	Maharashtra	CR/Central		
Wathar	WTR	Maharashtra	CR/Central		
Wazerganj	WZJ	Bihar	ECR/East Central		
Wellington	WEL	Tamil Nadu	SR/Southern		
Wena	WENA	Bihar	ECR/East Central		
West Hill	WH	Kerala	SR/Southern		
West Mambalam	MBM	Tamil Nadu	SR/Southern		
Whitefield	WFD	Karnataka	SWR/South Western		
Wihirgaon	VHGN	Maharashtra	SCR/South Central		
Wimco Nagar	WCN	Tamil Nadu	SR/Southern	9 m	
Wirur	WIRR	Maharashtra	SCR/South Central		
WRS Colony PH	WRC	Chhattisgarh	SECR/South East Central		
Wyndhamganj	WDM	Uttar Pradesh	ECR/East Central		

== Y ==
List of Indian Railways stations whose names start with 'Y'

Station name	Station code	State	Railway zone	Elevation	Map
Yadalapur	YDLP	Andhra Pradesh	SCR/South Central		
Yadgir	YG	Karnataka	SCR/South Central		
Yadudih	YDD	Jharkhand	ECR/East Coastal		
Yadvendranagar	YDV	Uttar Pradesh	NER/North Eastern		
Yakutpura	YKA	Andhra Pradesh	SCR/South Central		
Yalvigi	YLG	Karnataka	SWR/South Western		
Yamuna Bridge	JAB	Uttar Pradesh	NCR/North Central		
Yamuna South Bank	JSB	Uttar Pradesh	NCR/North Central		
Yaqutganj	YAG	Uttar Pradesh	NER/North Eastern		
Yataluru	YAL	Andhra Pradesh	SCR/South Central		
Yavatmal	YTL	Maharashtra	CR/Central		
Yedamangala	YDM	Karnataka	SWR/South Western		
Yedapalli	YDP	Andhra Pradesh	SCR/South Central		
Yedakumeri	YDK	Karnataka	SWR/South Western		
Yedshi	YSI	Maharashtra	CR/Central		
Yelahanka Junction	YNK	Karnataka	SWR/South Western		
Yelgur	YGL	Andhra Pradesh	SCR/South Central		
Yeliyur	Y	Karnataka	SWE/South Western		
Yellakaru	YLK	Andhra Pradesh	SCR/South Central		
Yeola	YL	Maharashtra	CR/Central		
Yermaras	YS	Karnataka	SCR/South Central		
Yerpedu	YPD	Andhra Pradesh	SCR/South Central		
Yerra Goppa Halt	YGA	Karnataka	SWE/South Western		
Yerraguntla Junction	YA	Andhra Pradesh	SCR/South Central		
Yesvantpur Junction	YPR	Karnataka	SWR/South Western		
Yeulkhed	YAD	Maharashtra	CR/Central		
Yevat	YT	Maharashtra	CR/Central		
Yogendra Dham Halt	YEAM	Uttar Pradesh	NER/North Eastern		
Yusufpur	YFP	Uttar Pradesh	NER/North Eastern		

== Z ==
List of Indian Railways stations whose names start with 'Z'

Station name	Station code	State	Railway zone	Elevation	Map
Zafarabad Junction	ZBD	Uttar Pradesh	NR/Northern	84 m	
Zahirabad	ZB	Telangana	SCR/South Central	634 m	
Zamania	ZNA	Uttar Pradesh	ECR/East Central	76 m	
Zampini	ZPI	Andhra Pradesh	SCR/South Central	10 m	
Zantalapalle	ZPL	Andhra Pradesh	SCR/South Central		
Zankhvav	ZNK	Gujarat	WR/Western	121 m	
Zarap	ZARP	Maharashtra	KR/Konkan		
Zarpur Pali	ZP	Haryana	NWR/North Western		
Zawar	ZW	Rajasthan	NWR/North Western	353 m	
Zindpura	ZNP	Uttar Pradesh	NE/North Eastern		

== List of stations (Code Wise) ==
Station code	Station name	State	Railway division	Railway zone	Elevation	Notes
AABH	Ambika Bhawani Halt					
AADR	Amb Andaura					
AAG	Angar					
AAGH	Antagarh					
AAH	Itehar					
AAL	Amlai					
ABP	Akbarpur Junction					
ADI	Ahmedabad Junction					
AF	Agra Fort					
AGC	Agra Cantt.					
AGTL	Agartala					
AHQ	Ahera					
AII	Ajmer Junction					
AILM	Ailum					
AIRL	Airoli					
AIT	Ait Junction					
AJN	Ajnod					
AJNI	Ajni					
AKLA	Aklera					
AKN	Akbarnagar					
AKRA	Akra					
ALN	Aalandi Mhaatobaachi					
ANG	Ahilyanagar Junction					
ANVT	Anand Vihar Terminal					
ASH	Aishbagh Junction					
ASN	Asansol Junction					
ASR	Amritsar Junction					
ATNR	Awatarnagar					
ATPA	Awantipora					
AVD	Avadi					
AWPR	Awapur					
AWR	Alwar Junction					

== See also ==
- List of railway lines in India
- Rail transport in India
- Indian Railways
