= Udhna (Surat)–Brahmapur Amrit Bharat Express =

Amrit Bharat Express train route in India

Udhna Junction (Surat)–Brahmapur Amrit Bharat Express
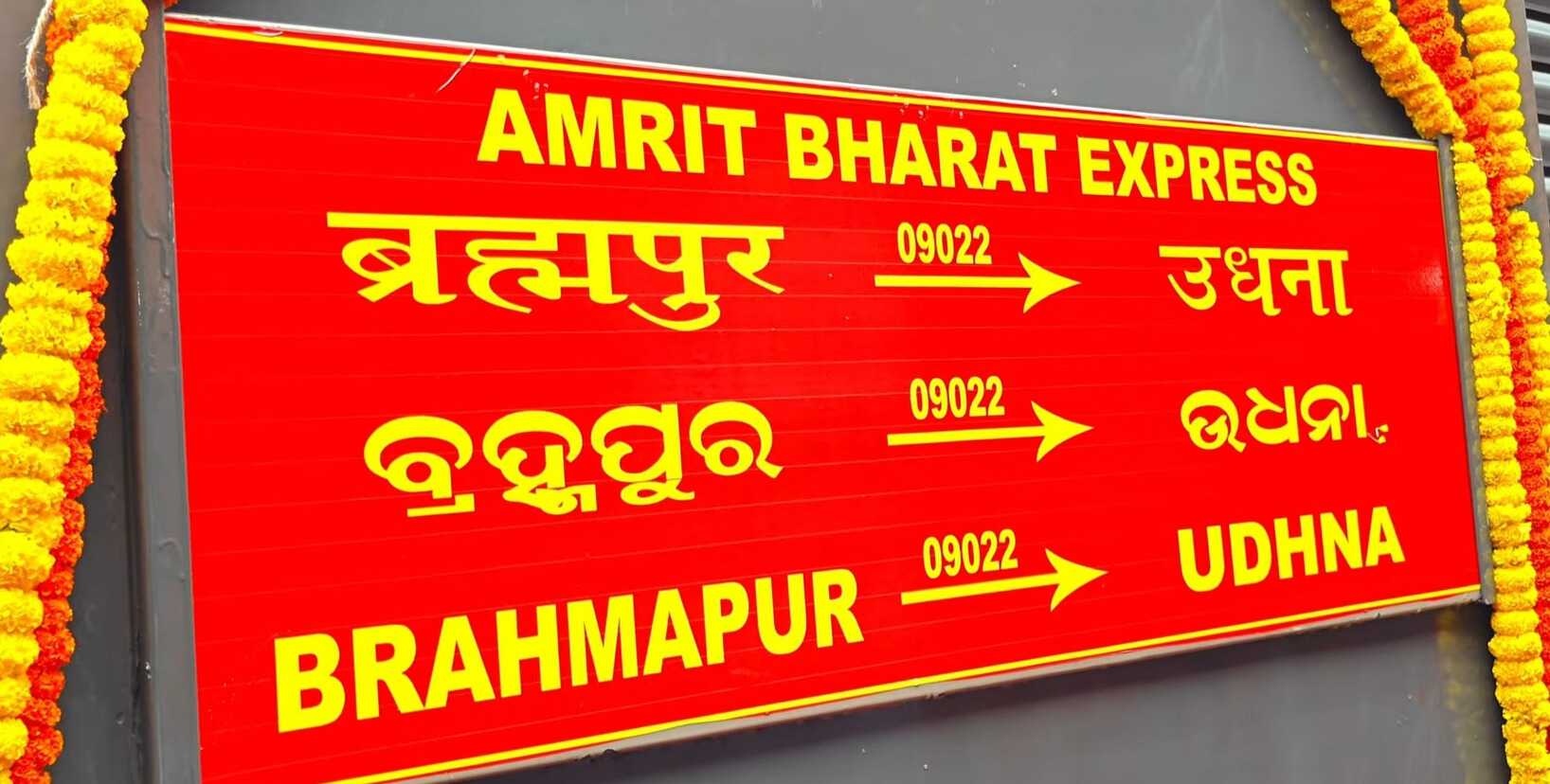

Overview
- Service type: Amrit Bharat Express, Superfast Express Train
- Status: Active
- Locale: Gujarat, Maharashtra, Chhattisgarh, Odisha and Andhra Pradesh
- First service: 27 September 2025; 13 months ago (Inaugural) 5 October 2025; 12 months ago (commercially)
- Current operator: Western Railways (WR)

Route
- Termini: Udhna Junction (UDN); Brahmapur (BAM)
- Stops: 30
- Distance travelled: 1,710 km (1,063 mi)
- Average journey time: 30h 15m
- Service frequency: Daily
- Train number: 19021/19022
- Lines used: Udhna–Jalgaon line; Bhusaval–Nagpur main line; Nagpur–Raipur line; Titlagarh–Vizianagaram line; Vizianagaram–Brahmapur line

On-board services
- Class: Sleeper class coach (SL) General unreserved coach (GS)
- Seating arrangements: Yes (12 coaches)
- Sleeping arrangements: Yes (08 coaches)
- Catering facilities: Pantry car
- Observation facilities: Saffron-grey livery
- Entertainment facilities: Electric outlets; Reading lights; Bottle holder
- Other facilities: CCTV cameras; Bio-vacuum toilets; Foot-operated water taps; Passenger information system

Technical
- Rolling stock: Modified LHB coaches
- Track gauge: Indian gauge
- Electrification: 25 kV 50 Hz AC overhead line
- Operating speed: 56 km/h (35 mph) (Avg.)
- Average length: 23.54 m (77.2 ft) (each) and 22 coaches
- Track owner: Indian Railways
- Rake maintenance: Udhna Jn (UDN)

The 19021/19022 Udhna (Surat)–Brahmapur Amrit Bharat Express is India's 12th Non-AC Superfast Amrit Bharat Express train, which runs across the states of Gujarat, Maharashtra, Chhattisgarh, Odisha and Andhra Pradesh by connecting the Silk weaving city of Surat in Gujarat with Berhampur, the Silk city of Odisha via Bhusaval Junction, Nagpur Junction and Titlagarh Junction. Initially train started Weekly, then Tri-weekly and on 6 July 2026, running Daily.

This express train is inaugurated on 27 September 2025 by Prime Minister Narendra Modi from Berhampur, Odisha in India.

== Overview ==
This train will be operated by Indian Railways, connecting Udhna Junction and Brahmapur. It will be operated with train numbers 19021/19022 on Daily basis.

== Rakes ==
It is the 12th Amrit Bharat Express train in which the locomotives were designed by Chittaranjan Locomotive Works (CLW) at Chittaranjan, West Bengal and the coaches were designed and manufactured by the Integral Coach Factory at Perambur, Chennai under the Make in India initiative.

== Service ==
The 19021/19022 Udhna (Surat)–Brahmapur Amrit Bharat Express operating Daily, covering a distance of 1,710 km (1,063 mi) in a travel time of 30hrs 15mins with average speed of 56 km/h. The Maximum Permissible Speed (MPS) is 130 km/h (81 mph).

== Routes & halts ==
The halts for this 19021/19022 Udhna (Surat)–Brahmapur Amrit Bharat Express are as follows:-

1. Udhna Junction
2. Bardoli
3. Vyara
4. Navapur
5. Nandurbar
6. Dondaicha
7. Sindkheda
8. Amalner
9. Dharangaon
10. Jalgaon Junction
11. Bhusaval Junction
12. Malkapur
13. Akola Junction
14. Badnera Junction
15. Wardha Junction
16. Nagpur Junction
17. Gondia Junction
18. Durg Junction
19. Raipur Junction
20. Mahasamund
21. Khariar Road
22. Kantabanji
23. Titlagarh Junction
24. Kesinga
25. Muniguda
26. Rayagada
27. Parvathipuram
28. Bobbili Junction
29. Vizianagaram Junction
  (Reversal)
30. Srikakulam Road
31. Palasa
32. Brahmapur

== See also ==
- Amrit Bharat Express
- Vande Bharat Express
- Tejas Express
- Udhna Junction railway station
- Brahmapur railway station
