= Nandura railway station =

Railway station in Maharashtra, India

Nandura
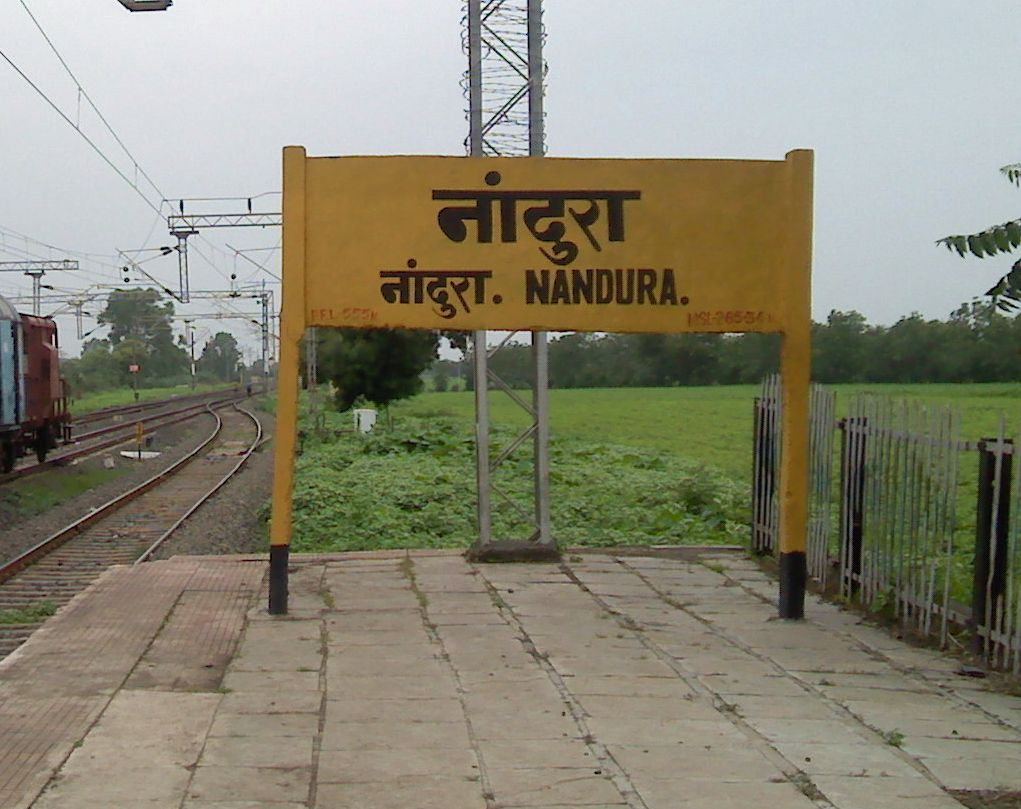

General information
- Location: Nandura, Buldhana district, Maharashtra; India
- Coordinates: 20°50′19″N 76°27′38″E
- Elevation: 268 metres (879 ft)
- System: Indian Railways station
- Owner: Indian Railways
- Operator: Central Railway
- Line: Howrah–Nagpur–Mumbai line
- Platforms: 2
- Tracks: 2

Construction
- Structure type: Standard (on ground)
- Parking: Yes

Other information
- Status: Active
- Station code: NN
- Zone(s): Central Railway
- Division(s): Bhusawal

History
- Opening: 1867
- Electrified: 1989-90
Location
- Location within Maharashtra

Nandura railway station is located in Nandura city of Buldhana district, Maharashtra. Its code is NN. It has two platforms. Passenger, Express, and Superfast trains halt here.

== Trains ==
The following trains halt at Nandura railway station in both directions:

- Surat–Amravati Express
- Sewagram Express
- Shalimar–Lokmanya Tilak Terminus Express
- Maharashtra Express
- Howrah–Ahmedabad Superfast Express
- Vidarbha Superfast Express
- Mumbai CSMT–Amravati Superfast Express
- Navjeevan Express
- Howrah–Mumbai CSMT Mail (via Nagpur)
- Puri–Ajmer Express
