= Amalner railway station =

Railway Station in Maharashtra, India

Amalner

General information
- Location: Amalner, Maharashtra; India
- Coordinates: 21°02′58″N 75°03′28″E
- Elevation: 186 metres (610 ft)
- System: Indian Railways station
- Owner: Indian Railways
- Operator: Western Railway
- Line: Udhna–Jalgaon line
- Platforms: 3
- Tracks: 5

Construction
- Parking: Yes
- Cycle facilities: Yes

Other information
- Status: Active
- Station code: AN
- Zone(s): Western Railway
- Division(s): Mumbai WR
Location
- Location within India Location within Maharashtra

Amalner railway station serves Amalner city in Jalgaon district in the Indian state of Maharashtra. Its code is AN. It has three platforms. Passenger, MEMU, Express and Superfast trains halt here. On 26 February 2024, Prime Minister Narendra Modi virtually lay the foundation stone for the re-development of the station.

== Trains ==
The following major trains halt at Amalner railway station in both directions:

- 12834/33 Howrah–Ahmedabad Superfast Express
- 12655/56 Navjeevan Express
- 20903/04 Vadodara–Varanasi Mahamana Express
- 20905/06 Vadodara–Rewa Mahamana Express
- 22937/38 Rajkot–Rewa Superfast Express
- 15563/64 Jaynagar–Udhna Antyodaya Express
- 22973/74 Gandhidham–Puri Weekly Express
- 22947/48 Surat–Bhagalpur Express
- 22939/40 Hapa–Bilaspur Superfast Express
- 22967/68 Ahmedabad–Allahabad Weekly Superfast Express
- 18421/22 Puri–Ajmer Express
- 19057/58 Udhna–Banaras Express
- 16501/02 Yesvantpur–Ahmedabad Weekly Express
- 18405/06 Puri–Ahmedabad Weekly Express
- 18401/02 Puri–Okha Dwarka Express
- 15559/60 Darbhanga–Ahmedabad Antyodaya Express
- 19025/26 Surat–Amravati Express
- 19003/04 Khandesh Express
- 19045/46 Tapti Ganga Express
- 17037/38 Secunderabad–Hisar Express
- 17623/24 Hazur Sahib Nanded–Shri Ganganagar Weekly Express
- 13425/26 Surat–Malda Town Express
