= Surat–Amravati Express =

Train in India

Overview
- Service type: Superfast Express
- Locale: Gujarat & Maharashtra
- First service: 4 August 2017; 8 years ago
- Current operator: Western Railway

Route
- Termini: Surat (ST); Amravati (AMI)
- Stops: 20
- Distance travelled: 562 km (349 mi)
- Average journey time: 10 hrs 05 mins
- Service frequency: Tri-weekly (Note: Runs three days in a week for every direction.)
- Train number: 20925 / 20926

On-board services
- Classes: AC Chair Car, Second Class Seating, Sleeper Class, General Unreserved
- Seating arrangements: Yes
- Sleeping arrangements: No
- Catering facilities: On-board catering, E-catering
- Observation facilities: Large windows
- Baggage facilities: No
- Other facilities: Below the seats

Technical
- Rolling stock: LHB coach
- Track gauge: 1,676 mm (5 ft 6 in)
- Operating speed: 56 km/h (35 mph) average including halts.

The 20925 / 20926 Surat–Amravati Express is an superfast express train belonging to Western Railway zone that runs between Surat and Amravati in India. It is currently being operated with 20925/20926 train numbers on tri-weekly basis.

== Service ==
- The 20925/Surat–Amravati Express has an average speed of 55 km/h and covers 562 km in 10 hours 05 mins.
- The 20926/Amravati–Surat Express has an average speed of 56 km/h and covers 562 km in 10 hours.

== Route and halts ==
The halts of the train are:

- Surat
- Udhna Junction
- Vyara
- Navapur
- Nandurbar
- Dondaicha
- Sindkheda
- Nardana
- Amalner
- Dharangaon
- Jalgaon Junction
- Bhusaval Junction
- Varangaon
- Bodwad
- Malkapur
- Nandura
- Jalamb Junction
- Shegaon
- Akola Junction
- Murtizapur Junction
- Badnera Junction
- Amravati terminal

== Coach composition ==
The train has LHB rakes with max speed of 130 kmph. The train consists of 17 coaches:

- 1 AC Chair Car
- 4 Second Class Seating
- 8 General Unreserved
- 2 Sleeper Class
- 2 Seating cum Luggage Rake & EoG

== Traction ==
Both trains are hauled by a Valsad Loco Shed-based WAP-4E electric locomotive from Surat to Amravati and vice versa.
