= Prerana Express =

Train in India

Overview
- Service type: Superfast
- Locale: Gujarat & Maharashtra
- First service: 6 July 2000; 25 years ago
- Current operator: Central Railway

Route
- Termini: Ahmedabad (ADI); Nagpur (NGP)
- Stops: 14
- Distance travelled: 957 km (595 mi)
- Average journey time: 16 hours 30 minutes
- Service frequency: Tri-weekly
- Train number: 22137 / 22138

On-board services
- Classes: AC 2 tier, AC 3 tier, Sleeper class, General Unreserved
- Seating arrangements: Yes
- Sleeping arrangements: Yes
- Catering facilities: On-board catering, E-catering
- Observation facilities: Large windows
- Baggage facilities: Available
- Other facilities: Below the seats

Technical
- Rolling stock: ICF coach
- Track gauge: 1,676 mm (5 ft 6 in); Broad Gauge
- Operating speed: 110 km/h (68 mph) maximum, 58 km/h (36 mph) average including halts.
Route map
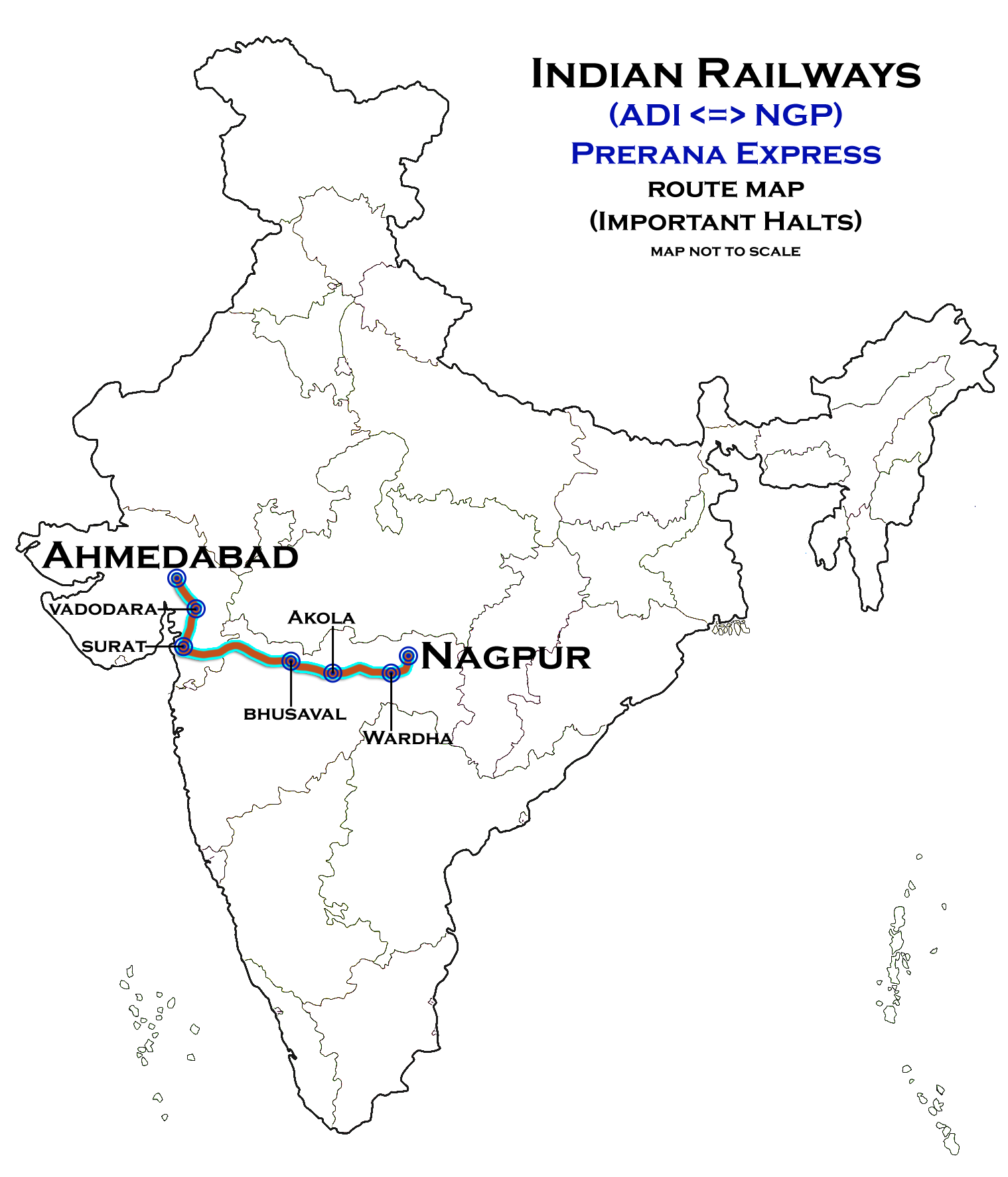

The 22137 / 22138 Prerana Express is an Express train belonging to Indian Railways that runs between Nagpur Junction and Ahmedabad Junction in India.

It operates as train number 22138 from Ahmedabad Junction to Nagpur Junction and as train number 22137 in the reverse direction.

== Coaches ==
The 22137/22138 Nagpur–Ahmedabad Prerana Express presently has ICF coach, 1 AC II tier, 3 AC III tier, 9 Sleeper class, 2 General unreserved and 2 SLR.

As with most train services in India, coach composition may be amended at the discretion of Indian Railways depending on demand.

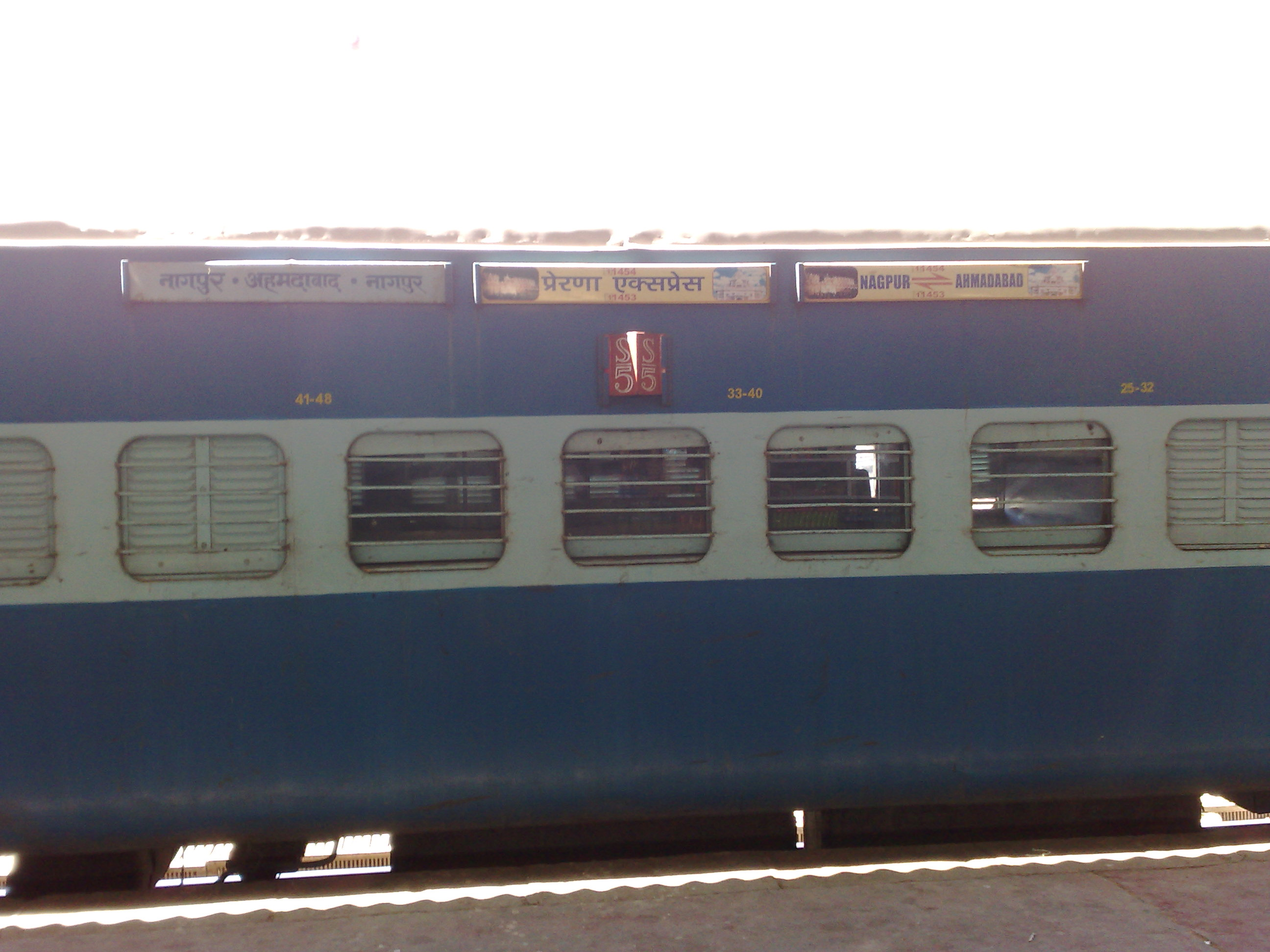
11453 Prerana Express – Sleeper coach

== Service ==
The 11454 Nagpur–Ahmedabad Prerana Express covers the distance of 957 kilometres in 18 hours 10 mins (52.68 km/h) and in 19 hours 40 mins (48.66 km/h) as 11453 Ahmedabad–Nagpur Prerana Express.

As the average speed of the train is below 55 km/h, as per Indian Railways rules, its fare does not include a Superfast surcharge.

== Route and halts ==
- Nagpur Junction
- Wardha Junction
- Badnera Junction
- Akola Junction
- Malkapur
- Bhusaval Junction
- Jalgaon Junction
- Dondaicha
- Nandurbar
- Surat
- Bharuch Junction
- Vadodara Junction
- Anand Junction
- Nadiad Junction
- Ahmedabad Junction

== Traction ==
It is hauled by a Ajni Loco Shed-based WAP-7 electric locomotive on its entire journey.

== Rake sharing ==
The train shares its rake with 11203/11204 Nagpur–Jaipur Weekly Express.

== Time table ==
- 22137 Nagpur–Ahmedabad Prerana Express leaves Nagpur Junction every Wednesday, Saturday and Sunday at 8:15 am hrs IST and reaches Ahmedabad Junction at 10:45 PM hrs IST the next day.
- 22138 Ahmedabad–Nagpur Prerana Express leaves Ahmedabad Junction every Tuesday, Thursday and Sunday at 7:10 PM hrs IST and reaches Nagpur Junction at 10:00 AM hrs IST the next day.

== Schedule ==
Station code	Station name	22137 – Nagpur Junction to Ahmedabad Junction		Distance from source in km	Day	22138 – Ahmedabad Junction to Nagpur Junction		Distance from source in km	Day
Station code	Station name	Arrival	Departure	Distance from source in km	Day	Arrival	Departure	Distance from source in km	Day
NGP	Nagpur Junction	Source	10:30	0	1	10:40	Destination	957	2
WR	Wardha Junction	11:27	11:30	79	1	09:12	09:15	878	2
BD	Badnera Junction	13:07	13:10	174	1	07:57	08:00	783	2
AK	Akola Junction	14:10	14:15	253	1	06:15	06:20	704	2
MKU	Malkapur	15:23	15:25	343	1	04:58	05:00	614	2
BSL	Bhusaval Junction	16:20	16:30	393	1	03:50	04:00	564	2
JL	Jalgaon Junction	17:20	17:25	417	1	03:18	03:20	540	2
NDB	Nandurbar	20:00	20:05	568	1	23:55	00:15	389	2
ST	Surat	23:25	23:35	728	1	21:10	21:20	229	1
BH	Bharuch Junction	00:16	00:18	787	2	19:52	19:54	170	1
BRC	Vadodara Junction	01:21	01:26	857	2	19:02	19:07	100	1
ANND	Anand Junction	02:03	02:05	893	2	18:16	18:18	64	1
ND	Nadiad Junction	02:21	02:23	911	2	17:59	18:01	46	1
ADI	Ahmedabad Junction	03:35	Destination	957	2	Source	17:20	0	1
