= Dondaicha railway station =

Railway station in Maharashtra, India

Dondaicha

General information
- Location: Dondaicha, Dhule district, Maharashtra; India
- Coordinates: 21°19′53″N 74°33′45″E
- Elevation: 163 metres (535 ft)
- System: Indian Railways station
- Owner: Indian Railways
- Operator: Western Railway zone
- Line: Udhna–Jalgaon line
- Platforms: 3
- Tracks: 6

Construction
- Structure type: Standard (on ground)
- Parking: Yes

Other information
- Status: Active
- Station code: DDE
- Zone(s): Western Railways
- Division(s): Mumbai WR

Passengers
- 1400 Per Day

Services
Preceding station	Indian Railways	Following station
Ranala towards ?	Udhna–Jalgaon line	Vikhran towards ?
Location
- Location within India Location within Maharashtra

Dondaicha railway station is located in Dondaicha town of Dhule district, Maharashtra. Its code is DDE. It has two platforms. Passenger, MEMU, Express and Superfast trains halt here.

== Trains ==
The following trains halt at Dondaicha railway station in both directions:

- 12834/33 Howrah–Ahmedabad Superfast Express
- 12655/56 Navjivan Express
- 19045/46 Tapti Ganga Express
- 22947/48 Surat–Bhagalpur Express
- 19025/26 Surat–Amravati Express
- 17037/38 Secunderabad–Hisar Express
- 19003/04 Khandesh Express
- 18405/06 Puri–Ahmedabad Weekly Express
- 18401/02 Puri–Okha Dwarka Express
- 18421/22 Puri–Ajmer Express
- 22138/37 Prerana Express
- 69170/80 Udhna–Paldhi MEMU
- 59013/14 Surat–Bhusawal Passenger
- 59077/78 Surat–Bhusawal Passenger
- 59075/76 Surat–Bhusawal Passenger
