= Ukai Songadh railway station =

Railway station in Gujarat, India

Ukai Songadh

General information
- Location: Songadh, Tapi district India
- Coordinates: 21°09′04″N 73°33′33″E
- Elevation: 144 metres (472 ft)
- System: Indian Railways station
- Owner: Ministry of Railways, Indian Railways
- Operator: Western Railway
- Line: Udhna–Jalgaon line
- Platforms: 3
- Tracks: 3

Construction
- Structure type: Standard (on-ground station)
- Parking: Available

Other information
- Status: Functioning
- Station code: USD
- Zone(s): Western Railways
- Division(s): Mumbai WR
Location
- Location within India Location within Gujarat

Ukai Songadh railway station is a railway station in Tapi district of Gujarat state of India. It is under Mumbai WR railway division of Western Railway zone of Indian Railways. Ukai Songadh railway station is 18 km far away from Vyara railway station. It serves Songadh and Ukai town. It is located on Udhna – Jalgaon main line of the Indian Railways.

It is located at 144 m above sea level and has two platform. As of 2016, electrified double broad-gauge railway line exists at this station. Passenger, MEMU trains halt here.

== See also ==
- Vyara railway station
- Tapi district
