= Nardana railway station =

Railway station in Maharashtra, India

Nardana

General information
- Location: Nardana, Dhule district, Maharashtra; India
- Coordinates: 21°10′40″N 74°49′42″E
- Elevation: 184 metres (604 ft)
- System: Indian Railways station
- Owner: Indian Railways
- Operator: Western Railway zone
- Line: Udhna–Jalgaon line
- Platforms: 3
- Tracks: 3

Construction
- Structure type: Standard (on ground)
- Parking: Yes

Other information
- Status: Active
- Station code: NDN
- Zone(s): Western Railways
- Division(s): Mumbai WR
Location
- Location within India Location within Maharashtra

Nardana railway station is located near Nardana town of Dhule district, Maharashtra. Its code is NDN. It has three platforms. Passenger and Express trains halt here.

== Trains ==
The following trains halt at Nardana railway station in both directions:

- 19025/26 Surat–Amravati Express
- 19003/04 Khandesh Express
