= Dharangaon railway station =

Railway Station in Maharashtra, India

Dharangaon

General information
- Location: Dharangaon, Maharashtra; India
- Coordinates: 21°00′23″N 75°17′10″E
- Elevation: 216 metres (709 ft)
- System: Indian Railways station
- Owner: Indian Railways
- Operator: Western Railway
- Line: Udhna–Jalgaon line
- Platforms: 2
- Tracks: 2

Construction
- Structure type: Standard (on ground)
- Parking: Yes
- Cycle facilities: Yes

Other information
- Status: Active
- Station code: DXG
- Zone(s): Western Railway
- Division(s): Mumbai WR

History
- Opened: 1900
- Former names: Great Indian Peninsula Railway
Location
- Location within India Location within Maharashtra

Dharangaon railway station serves Dharangaon city in Jalgaon district in the Indian state of Maharashtra. Its code is DXG. It has two platforms. Passenger, MEMU, Express and Superfast trains halt here.

== Trains ==
The following trains halt at Dharangaon railway station in both directions:

- 12834/33 Howrah–Ahmedabad Superfast Express
- 12655/56 Navjeevan Express
- 12843/44 Puri–Ahmedabad Express
- 19025/26 Surat–Amravati Express
- 19003/04 Khandesh Express
