= Sindkheda railway station =

Railway station in Maharashtra, India

Sindkheda

General information
- Location: Sindkheda, Dhule district, Maharashtra; India
- Coordinates: 21°14′39″N 74°43′26″E
- Elevation: 178 metres (584 ft)
- System: Indian Railways station
- Owner: Indian Railways
- Operator: Western Railway zone
- Line: Udhna–Jalgaon line
- Platforms: 2
- Tracks: 2

Construction
- Structure type: Standard (on ground)
- Parking: Yes

Other information
- Status: Active
- Station code: SNK
- Zone(s): Western Railways
- Division(s): Mumbai WR

Passengers
- 322 Per Day

Services
Preceding station	Indian Railways	Following station
Sonshelu towards ?	Udhna–Jalgaon line	Hol towards ?
Location
- Location within India Location within Maharashtra

Sindkheda railway station is located near Sindkheda town of Dhule district, Maharashtra. Its code is SNK. It has two platforms. Passenger, MEMU, Express and Superfast trains halt here.

== Trains ==
The following trains halt at Sindkheda railway station in both directions:

- 12834/33 Howrah–Ahmedabad Superfast Express
- 12655/56 Navjivan Express
- 19025/26 Surat–Amravati Express
- 19003/04 Khandesh Express
- 19045/46 Tapti Ganga Express
