= Vyara railway station =

Railway station in Gujarat, India

General information
- Location: Vyara, Gujarat; India
- Coordinates: 21°07′04″N 73°23′07″E
- Elevation: 90 metres (300 ft)
- System: Indian Railways station
- Owner: Ministry of Railways, Indian Railways
- Operator: Western Railway
- Line: Udhna–Jalgaon line
- Platforms: 2
- Tracks: 2

Construction
- Structure type: Standard (on-ground station)
- Parking: Available

Other information
- Status: Functioning
- Station code: VYA
- Zone(s): Western Railways
- Division(s): Mumbai WR
Location
- Location within India Location within Gujarat

Vyara railway station is a railway station in Tapi district of Gujarat state of India. It is under Mumbai WR railway division of Western Railway zone of Indian Railways. Vyara railway station is 61 km far away from Surat railway station. It is located on Udhna – Jalgaon main line of the Indian Railways.

It is located at 90 m above sea level and has two platform. As of 2016, electrified double broad-gauge railway line exists at this station. Passenger, MEMU, Express and Superfast trains halt here.

== Nearby stations ==
Lotarva is the nearest railway station towards Surat, whereas Kikakui Road is the nearest railway station towards Jalgaon.

== Major trains ==
The following Express and Superfast trains halt at Vyara railway station in both directions:

- 12834/33 Howrah–Ahmedabad Superfast Express
- 19045/46 Tapti Ganga Express
- 22947/48 Surat–Bhagalpur Express
- 19051/52 Shramik Express
- 19025/26 Surat–Amravati Express
- 12655/56 Navjeevan Express

== See also ==
- Bardoli railway station
- Tapi district
