= Ajni (Nagpur)–Pune Vande Bharat Express =

Longest Mini Vande Bharat Express train route in India

Ajni (Nagpur)–Pune Junction Vande Bharat Express

Overview
- Service type: Vande Bharat Express
- Locale: Maharashtra
- First service: 10 August 2025; 11 months ago (Inaugural); 11 August 2025; 11 months ago (Commercial) (TBC)
- Current operator: Central Railways (CR)

Route
- Termini: Ajni (AJNI); Pune Junction (PUNE)
- Stops: 10
- Distance travelled: 882 km (548 mi)
- Average journey time: 12 hrs 00 mins
- Service frequency: Six days a week (Note: 26102 – Except Mondays | 26101 – Except Tuesdays)
- Train number: 26102 / 26101
- Lines used: Howrah–Nagpur–Mumbai (Ajni to Manmad), Manmad–Daund branch line, Mumbai–Chennai line (Daund to Pune)

On-board services
- Classes: AC Chair Car, AC Executive Chair Car
- Seating arrangements: Airline style; Rotatable seats
- Sleeping arrangements: No
- Catering facilities: On-board catering
- Observation facilities: Large windows in all coaches
- Entertainment facilities: On-board WiFi; Infotainment system; Electric outlets; Reading light; Seat pockets; Bottle holder; Tray table
- Baggage facilities: Overhead racks
- Other facilities: Kavach

Technical
- Rolling stock: Mini Vande Bharat 2.0
- Track gauge: Indian gauge
- Electrification: 25 kV 50 Hz AC overhead line
- Operating speed: 73 km/h (45 mph) (Avg.)
- Average length: 192 metres (630 ft) (08 coaches)
- Track owner: Indian Railways
- Rake maintenance: Nagpur Jn (NGP)

The 26102/26101 Ajni (Nagpur)–Pune Vande Bharat Express is India's 73rd and longest Vande Bharat Express train, which connects the Orange city of India, Nagpur with the cultural capital of Maharashtra, Pune.

This express train was inaugurated on August 10, 2025, by Prime Minister Narendra Modi via video-conferencing from Bangalore in Karnataka.

== Overview ==
This train is currently operated by Indian Railways, connecting Ajni (Nagpur), Wardha Junction, Badnera Junction, Akola Junction, Shegaon, Bhusaval Junction, Jalgaon Junction, Manmad Junction, Kopargaon, Ahilyanagar, Daund Chord Line and Pune Junction. It is currently operated with train numbers 26102/26101 on 6 days a week basis.

== Rakes ==
It is the sixty-eighth and the longest 2nd Generation Mini Vande Bharat Express train which was designed and manufactured by the Integral Coach Factory at Perambur, Chennai under the Make in India initiative.

== Service ==
The 26102/26101 Ajni (Nagpur)–Pune Vande Bharat Express currently operates 6 days a week, covering a distance of 882 km (548 mi) in a travel time of 12 hrs 00 mins with average speed of 73 km/h. The Maximum Permissible Speed (MPS) is 130 km/h (81 mph).

== See also ==
- Vande Bharat Express
- Tejas Express
- Gatiman Express
- Ajni railway station
- Pune Junction railway station
