= Khandesh Express =

Train in India

Overview
- Service type: Express
- Locale: Gujarat & Maharashtra
- First service: 16 February 2019; 7 years ago
- Current operator: Western Railway

Route
- Termini: Dadar (DDR); Bhusaval (BSL)
- Stops: 18
- Distance travelled: 581 km (361 mi)
- Average journey time: 11 hrs 55 mins
- Service frequency: Tri-weekly (Note: Runs 3 days in a week for every direction.)
- Train number: 19003 / 19004

On-board services
- Classes: AC 2 Tier, AC 3 Tier, Sleeper Class, General Unreserved
- Seating arrangements: Yes
- Sleeping arrangements: Yes
- Catering facilities: On-board catering, E-catering
- Observation facilities: Large windows
- Baggage facilities: No
- Other facilities: Below the seats

Technical
- Rolling stock: ICF coach
- Track gauge: 1,676 mm (5 ft 6 in)
- Operating speed: 49 km/h (30 mph) average including halts.
- Rake sharing: 19015/19016 Saurashtra Express

The 19003 / 19004 Khandesh Express is an express train belonging to Western Railway zone that runs between Dadar and Bhusaval Junction in India. It is currently being operated with 19003/19004 train numbers on tri-weekly basis.

== Coach composition ==
The train has standard ICF rakes with max speed of 110 km/h. The train consists of 21 coaches:

- 3 AC II Tier
- 3 AC III Tier
- 9 Sleeper Coaches
- 4 General Unreserved
- 2 Seating cum Luggage Rake

== Service ==
- 19003 Khandesh Express has an average speed of 49 km/h and covers 576 km in 11h 40m.
- 19004 Khandesh Express has an average speed of 50 km/h and covers 576 km in 11h 25m.

== Route and halts ==
The important halts of the train are:

- Dadar
- Borivali
- Virar
- Palghar
- Vapi
- Valsad
- Navsari
- Bhestan
- Bardoli
- Navapur
- Nandurbar
- Dondaicha
- Sindkheda
- Nardana
- Amalner
- Dharangaon
- Jalgaon Junction
- Bhusaval Junction

== Schedule ==
Train number	Station code	Departure station	Departure time	Departure day	Arrival station	Arrival time	Arrival day
19003	DDR	Dadar	12:20 AM	Sun, Tue, Thu	Bhusaval Junction	12:00 PM	Sun, Tue, Thu
19004	BSL	Bhusaval Junction	17:40 PM	Sun, Tue, Thu	Dadar	05:05 AM	Mon, Wed, Fri

== Traction ==
Both trains are hauled by a Valsad Loco Shed-based WAP-4E or Vadodara Loco Shed-based WAP-5 electric locomotive from Bandra Terminus to Bhusaval.

== See also ==
- Pune–Bhusaval Express
