= Varangaon railway station =

Railway station in Maharashtra, India

Varangaon

General information
- Location: Varangaon, Jalgaon district, Maharashtra; India
- Coordinates: 21°00′38″N 75°54′05″E
- System: Indian Railways station
- Owner: Indian Railways
- Operator: Central Railway
- Line: Howrah–Nagpur–Mumbai line
- Platforms: 3
- Tracks: 3

Construction
- Structure type: Standard (on ground)
- Parking: Yes

Other information
- Station code: VNA
- Zone(s): Central Railway
- Division(s): Bhusawal
Location
- Location within India Location within Maharashtra

Varangaon railway station is located near Varangaon town of Jalgaon district, Maharashtra. Its code is VNA. It has three platforms. Passenger, Express, and Superfast trains halt here.

== Trains ==
The following trains halt at Varangaon railway station in both directions:

- Surat–Amravati Express
- Mumbai CSMT–Nagpur Sewagram Superfast Express
- Shalimar–Lokmanya Tilak Terminus Express
- Gondia–Kolhapur Maharashtra Express
