= Ahmedabad–Prayagraj (Allahabad) Weekly Superfast Express =

Train in India

Overview
- Service type: Superfast
- First service: 13 November 2014; 11 years ago
- Current operator: Western Railway zone

Route
- Termini: Ahmedabad Junction (ADI); Prayagraj Junction (PRYJ)
- Stops: 18
- Distance travelled: 1,483 km (921 mi)
- Average journey time: 26h 40m
- Service frequency: Weekly (Note: Runs one day in a week for every direction.)
- Train number: 22967/22968

On-board services
- Classes: AC 2 tier, AC 3 tier, Sleeper class, General Unreserved
- Seating arrangements: No
- Sleeping arrangements: Yes
- Catering facilities: On-board catering E-catering
- Observation facilities: LHB coach
- Entertainment facilities: No
- Baggage facilities: No
- Other facilities: Below the seats

Technical
- Rolling stock: 2
- Track gauge: 1,676 mm (5 ft 6 in)
- Operating speed: 56 km/h (35 mph), including halts

The Ahmedabad–Prayagraj (Allahabad) Weekly Superfast Express is a Superfast train belonging to the Western Railway zone that runs between Ahmedabad Junction and Prayagraj Junction in India. It is currently being operated with 22967/22968 train numbers on a weekly basis.

== Service ==
The 22967/Ahmedabad–Prayagraj (Allahabad) Weekly Superfast Express has an average speed of 56 km/h and covers 1483 km in 26h 40m. The 22968/Allahabad–Prayagraj (Allahabad) Weekly Superfast Express has an average speed of 55 km/h and covers 1483 km in 27h.

== Route and halts ==
The important halts for the train are:

- Ahmedabad Junction
- Nadiad Junction
- Anand Junction
- Vadodara Junction
- Bharuch Junction
- Surat
- Nandurbar
- Jalgaon Junction
- Bhusaval Junction
- Khandwa Junction
- Itarsi Junction
- Narsinghpur
- Jabalpur Junction
- Katni Junction
- Maihar
- Satna Junction
- Manikpur Junction
- Allahabad Junction

== Coach composition ==
The train has standard LHB rakes with a maximum speed of 130 km/h. The train consists of 18 coaches:

- 1 AC II Tier
- 2 AC III Tier
- 7 Sleeper coaches
- 6 General Unreserved
- 2 Seating cum Luggage Rake

== Traction ==
Both trains are hauled by a Vadodara Loco Shed-based WAP-4E or Itarsi Loco Shed-based WAP-4 electric locomotive from Ahmedabad to Itarsi. From Itarsi the train is hauled by a Samastipur Loco Shed-based WDM-3A or WDM-3D diesel locomotive to Prayagraj, and vice versa.

== Direction reversal/Rake sharing ==
The train shares its rake with 19415/19416 Ahmedabad–Shri Mata Vaishno Devi Katra Express.

== See also ==
- Prayagraj Junction railway station
- Ahmedabad Junction railway station
