= Navapur railway station =

Railway station in Maharashtra, India

Navapur

General information
- Location: Navapur, Nandurbar district, Maharashtra; India
- Coordinates: 21°09′59″N 73°46′21″E
- Elevation: 123 metres (404 ft)
- System: Indian Railways station
- Owner: Indian Railways
- Operator: Western Railway zone
- Line: Udhna–Jalgaon line
- Platforms: 3
- Tracks: 4

Construction
- Structure type: Standard (on ground)
- Parking: Yes

Other information
- Status: Active
- Station code: NWU
- Zone(s): Western Railways
- Division(s): Mumbai WR
Location
- Location within India Location within Maharashtra

Navapur railway station is located on Gujarat–Maharashtra state border in Navapur town of Nandurbar district, Maharashtra. Its code is NWU. It has three platforms. Passenger, MEMU, Express and Superfast trains halt here.

== About Navapur ==
- Navapur railway station is located on the border of Gujarat and Maharashtra
- Navapur is a Tehsil of Nandurbar district, Maharashtra.

== Trains ==
The following trains halt at Navapur railway station in both directions:

- 12834/33 Howrah–Ahmedabad Superfast Express
- 19045/46 Tapti Ganga Express
- 22947/48 Surat–Bhagalpur Express
- 19025/26 Surat–Amravati Express
- 19003/04 Khandesh Express
- 59013/14 Surat-Bhusawal Passenger
- 69179/80 Udhna-Paldhi MEMU
