= Sevagram Junction railway station =

Railway station in Maharashtra, India

Coordinates: 20.7391°N 78.6185°E

Sevagram Junction
- Indian Railways logo

General information
- Location: Wardha, Maharashtra; India
- Elevation: 279 metres (915 ft)
- System: Indian Railways junction station
- Owner: Indian Railways
- Operator: Central Railway
- Lines: Howrah–Nagpur–Mumbai line New Delhi–Chennai main line
- Platforms: 5
- Tracks: 10

Construction
- Structure type: At ground
- Parking: Available

Other information
- Station code: SEGM
- Division(s): Nagpur

History
- Opened: 1985
- Electrified: 1990–91
Location
- Location within Maharashtra Location within India

Sevagram Junction is a railway station serving Wardha city, in Wardha district, Maharashtra, India. It is under Nagpur railway division of Central Railway zone of Indian Railways. It is an important junction station on the Howrah–Mumbai and Delhi–Chennai trunk line of the Indian Railways. This was known earlier as "Wardha East" (station code WRE).

It is located at 279 m above sea level and has five platforms. As of 2016, at this station, 76 trains stop.

It is notable for the extremely steep rail curve south of the station requiring inbound and outbound trains to slow down considerably.

== History ==
The first passenger train in India travelled from Mumbai to Thane on 16 April 1853. By May 1854, Great Indian Peninsula Railway's Bombay–Thane line was extended to Kalyan. Bhusawal railway station was set up in 1860, and in 1867 the GIPR branch line was extended to Nagpur.

Before establishment of Sevagram railway station, north–south-bound trains had to get their engines reversed in opposite direction, which was a very time-consuming process. To avoid this problem, a new station for halting north–south-bound trains was established in 1985, named Sevagram railway station. Since then, trains running on New Delhi–Chennai main line halt at Sevagram railway station, bypassing Wardha railway station.

The railways in the Badnera–Wardha sector were electrified in 1990–1991.

The station has been equipped with new Route Relay Interlocking (RRI) for faster train operation.

Preceding station	Indian Railways	Following station
Warud towards Nagpur Junction	Central Railway zone Nagpur–Bhusawal section	Wardha Junction towards Bhusaval Junction
Warud towards Nagpur Junction	Central Railway zone Nagpur–Secunderabad line	Chitoda towards Secunderabad Junction
