= Darbhanga–Ahmedabad Antyodaya Express =

Train service in India

Darbhanga Junction – Ahmedabad Junction Antyodaya Express

Overview
- Service type: Antyodaya Express
- First service: 4 February 2015
- Current operator: East Central Railways

Route
- Termini: Darbhanga Junction (DBG); Ahmedabad Junction (ADI)
- Stops: 25
- Distance travelled: 2,015 km (1,252 mi)
- Average journey time: 39h 55m
- Service frequency: Once a week
- Train number: 15559 / 15560

On-board services
- Class: Unreserved
- Seating arrangements: No
- Sleeping arrangements: Yes
- Catering facilities: No

Technical
- Rolling stock: LHB-Antyodaya
- Track gauge: 1,676 mm (5 ft 6 in)
- Operating speed: 44 km/h (27 mph)
Route map
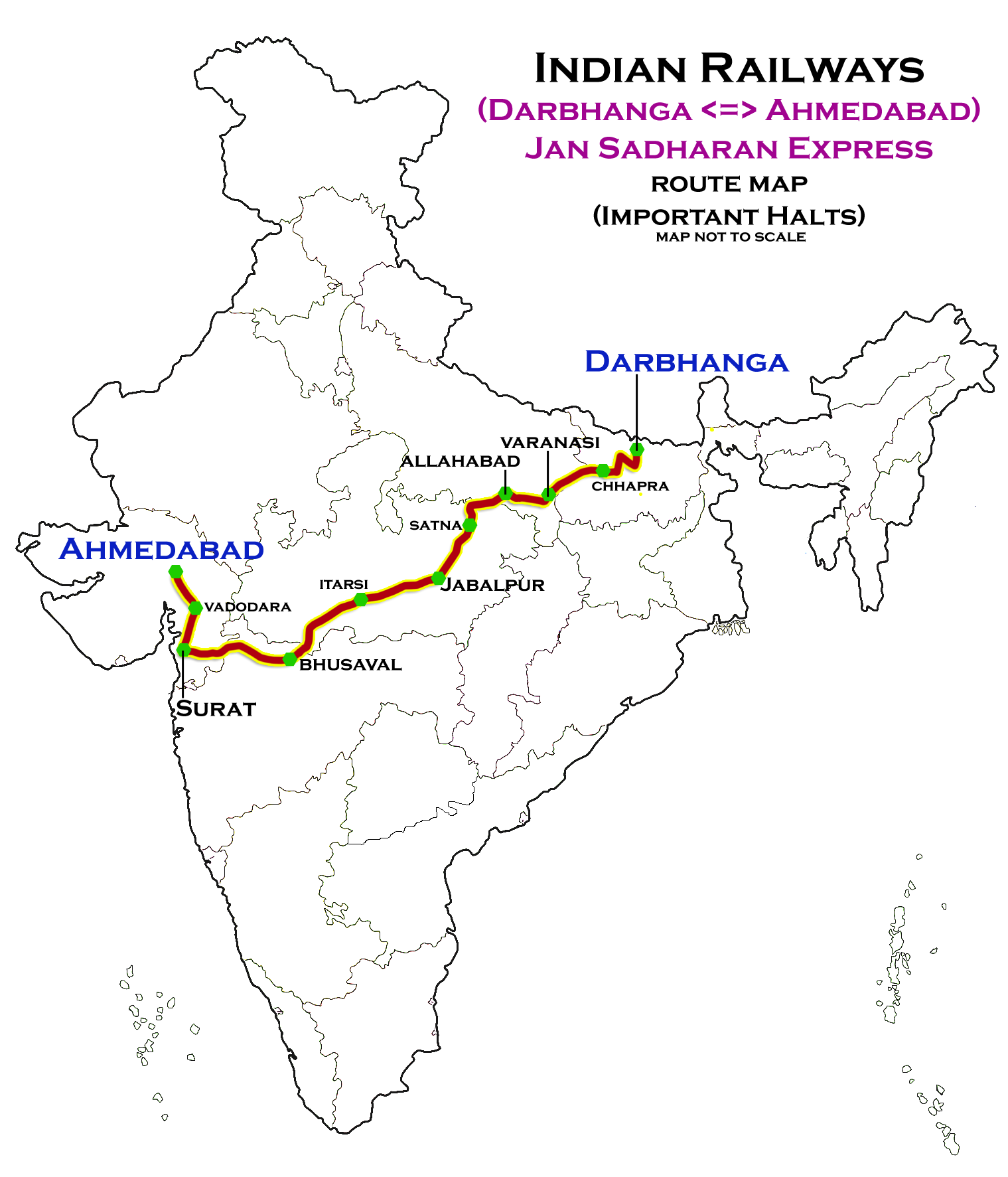

The 15559 / 15560 Darbhanga–Ahmedabad Antyodaya Express is a fully unreserved Express train of the Indian Railways for connecting Darbhanga Junction in Bihar and Ahmedabad Junction in Gujarat. It is currently being operated with 15559/15560 train numbers on once in week.

This train was started as Jan Sadharan Express on 04 Feb 2015 with the rake zone of Western Railway, It has become popular for direct connectivity to East and West part of India with lower rates. Till 4 years it gave service. Later, after approval for a more comfortable journey from Ministry of Railways of India, it was converted into Antyodaya Express and also the Rake zone was also transferred to East Central Railway zone.

== Service ==
It covers the distance of 2016 km with an average speed of 50 km/h on both sides.

== Route & halts ==
The important halts of the train are :

- Darbhanga Junction
- Samastipur
- Muzaffarpur Junction
- Chhapra Junction
- Ballia
- Ghazipur City
- Varanasi Junction
- Manduadih
- Allahabad Junction
- Satna
- Katni Junction
- Jabalpur Junction
- Itarsi Junction
- Khandwa
- Bhusaval
- Amalner
- Nandurbar
- Surat
- Bharuch Junction
- Vadodara
- Anand Junction
- Ahmedabad Junction

== Coach composite ==
The train consists of 22 coaches: earlier was ICF rakes now gets an LHB Antyodaya coaches

- 16 General
- 2 Second-class Luggage/parcel van
- 4 Deen Dayalu (unreserved)

== Traction ==
earlier was Jan Sadharan Express it used pull with WDP-4D. As the route is yet to be fully electrified, it is hauled by a Samastipur Diesel Loco Shed-based WDM-3D or WDM-3A locomotive from Darbhanga up to Itarsi handing over to an Itarsi Electric Loco Shed-based WAP-4 locomotive for the remainder of the journey until Ahmedabad. Once the route was fully electrified this train gets an WAP-7 or WAP-4 pulled end to end

== Direction reversal ==
The train reverses its direction 2 times:

- Allahabad Junction
- Samastipur Junction

== See also ==
- Sabarmati Express
