= Maharashtra Express =

Train in India

Overview
- Service type: Express
- Locale: Maharashtra
- First service: 1 November 1971; 55 years ago
- Current operator: Central Railway

Route
- Termini: Gondia Junction (G); SCSMT Kolhapur (KOP)
- Stops: 59
- Distance travelled: 1,348 km (838 mi)
- Average journey time: 28 hours 45 minutes
- Service frequency: Daily
- Train number: 11039 / 11040

On-board services
- Classes: AC 2 Tier, AC 3 Tier, Sleeper Class, General Unreserved
- Seating arrangements: Yes
- Sleeping arrangements: Yes
- Catering facilities: On-board catering, E-catering
- Observation facilities: Large windows
- Baggage facilities: No
- Other facilities: Below the seats

Technical
- Rolling stock: LHB coach
- Track gauge: 1,676 mm (5 ft 6 in)
- Operating speed: 48 km/h (30 mph) average including halts.

The 11039 / 11040 Maharashtra Express is an express train belonging to Indian Railways that run between Gondia Junction and SCSMT Kolhapur in India. It operates as train number 11040 from Gondia Junction to SCSMT Kolhapur and as train number 11039 in the reverse direction.

It holds the current record for the longest distance covered in one state as its entire run of 1,348 km (838 mi) is entirely within Maharashtra

This train is named after the state of Maharashtra. Although its name puts it in the league of trains named after their states .i.e. Kerala Express, Tamil Nadu Express, Andhra Pradesh Express etc., it does not connect the state & national capitals.

== Coaches ==
The 11039/11040 Maharashtra Express presently has 1 AC 2 Tier, 4 AC 3 Tier, 8 Sleeper Class, 5 General Unreserved and 2 SLR cum EoG LHB coaches.

It does not carry a pantry car coach.

As with most train services in India, coach composition may be amended at the discretion of Indian Railways depending on demand.

== Service ==
The 11039 Maharashtra Express covers the distance of 1,348 km (838 mi) in 28 hours 45 mins averaging 46.82 km/h (29 mph) & 28 hours 25 mins as 11040 Maharashtra Express averaging 47.37 km/h (29 mph).

As its average speed in both directions is below 55 km/h (34 mph) as per Indian Railways rules, it does not have an express surcharge.

It reverses direction at Pune Junction.

== Traction ==
As the route is fully electrified, a Bhusawal Loco Shed-based WAP-4 electric loco hauls the train from Gondia to Kolhapur and vice versa.

== Routing ==
The 11039/11040 Maharashtra Express runs from SCSMT Kolhapur via Miraj Junction, Karad, Satara, Pune Junction, Daund Chord Line, Ahilyanagar, Manmad Junction,Chalisgaon Junction, Jalgaon Junction, Bhusaval Junction, Shegaon, Akola Junction, Badnera Junction, Wardha Junction, Nagpur Junction, Bhandara Road to Gondia Junction.

== Time table ==
- 11040 Maharashtra Express leaves Gondia Junction on a daily basis and reaches SCSMT Kolhapur the next day.
- 11039 Maharashtra Express leaves SCSMT Kolhapur on a daily basis and reaches Gondia Junction the next day.
