= Shegaon railway station =

Railway Station in Maharashtra, India

Coordinates: 20.8012°N 76.6903°E

Shegaon railway station संत श्री गजानन महाराज नगरी

General information
- Location: Shegaon; India
- Elevation: 281 m (922 ft)
- System: Express & Passenger Train Station
- Operator: Indian Railways, Central Railway Zone, Bhusawal railway division
- Lines: Howrah–Nagpur–Mumbai line, Nagpur–Bhusawal section
- Platforms: 3
- Tracks: 6
- Train operators: Indian Railway

Construction
- Structure type: Standard Ground
- Parking: Available
- Cycle facilities: Available

Other information
- Station code: SEG
- Fare zone: Bhusawal

History
- Opened: 1867
- Electrified: 1989-90

Services
Good
Location
- Location within Maharashtra

Shegaon railway station is railway station located on Nagpur–Bhusawal section of Howrah–Nagpur–Mumbai line of Indian Railways. It is located near Panchayat Samiti Office, on North West side of Shegaon, which is famous for Gajanan Maharaj Temple.

The railway station comes under the Bhusawal railway division of Central Railway zone. The station has double electrified broad-gauge track and has three platforms of which one is under construction (as of 2019), at the elevation of 281 m (922 ft) above sea level. Its IR Station code is SEG. As of 2019 around 46 trains halt at this station. It serves Shegaon taluka and neighboring talukas of Buldhana district of Maharashtra.

This railway station is one of 44 railway stations of Maharashtra to be Redeveloping through Prime Minister of India Narendra Modi's Dream Project Amrit Bharat Station Scheme

== Major Stoppage trains ==
- Pune–Nagpur Garib Rath Express
- Ajni (Nagpur)–Pune Vande Bharat Express
- Howrah–Mumbai CSMT Mail (via Nagpur)
- Visakhapatnam–Lokmanya Tilak Terminus Superfast Express
- Vidarbha Superfast Express
- Maharashtra Express
- Azad Hind Express
- Pune–Ajni Humsafar Express
- Hazur Sahib Nanded–Jammu Tawi Humsafar Express
- Sewagram Express
