= Bardoli railway station =

Railway station in Gujarat, India

General information
- Location: Bardoli, Gujarat; India
- Coordinates: 21°08′02″N 73°06′18″E
- Elevation: 35 metres (115 ft)
- System: Indian Railways station
- Owner: Ministry of Railways, Indian Railways
- Operator: Western Railway
- Line: Udhna–Jalgaon line
- Platforms: 2
- Tracks: 2

Construction
- Structure type: Standard (on ground station)
- Parking: Available

Other information
- Status: Functioning
- Station code: BIY
- Zone(s): Western Railway
- Division(s): Mumbai WR

Services
Preceding station	Indian Railways	Following station
Gangadhara towards ?	Udhna–Jalgaon line	Timbarva towards ?
Location
- Location within India Location within Gujarat

Bardoli railway station is a railway station in Surat district of Gujarat state of India. It serves Bardoli town. It is under Mumbai WR railway division of Western Railway Zone of Indian Railways. Bardoli railway station is 31 km away from Surat railway station. It is located on Udhna – Jalgaon main line of the Indian Railways.

It is located at 35 m above sea level and has one platform. As of 2016, electrified double broad-gauge railway line exists at this station. Passenger, MEMU, and one Superfast trains halt here.

== Major trains ==
The following trains halt at Bardoli railway station in both directions:

- 12834/33 Howrah Ahmedabad Superfast Express
- 19003/04 Bandra Terminus–Bhusaval Khandesh Express

== See also ==
- Surat railway station
- Surat district
- List of tourist attractions in Surat
