= Nardana =

Coordinates: 21°12′N 74°49′E

Nardana is a small town in Shindkheda taluka, Dhule district, Maharashtra, India (PIN:425404). It has 15+ villages connected to it for commercial purpose. It is a local hub or main market place for these villagers. It has Gram panchayat, Civil Hospital, Schools (Medium: Marathi, English, Urdu). All primary needs are facilitated here. Police station is central to all these villages.

It is hot spot in nearby area. It has a Railway route (Bhusawal - Surat) only route for near by 90 km^{2} connected to Jalgaon junction. National Highway-3 is attraction for it. Also MIDC Maharashtra Industrial development Corporation near village giving it huge benefit for the employment and development of smart village.
