= Varangaon =

- City
- Location in Maharashtra, India
- Coordinates: 21°01′N 75°54′E
- Country: India
- State: Maharashtra
- District: Jalgaon

Government
  - Body: Varangaon Municipal Council

Dimensions
  - Length: 2.64 km (1.64 mi)
  - Width: 1.75 km (1.09 mi)

Population (2011)
  - Total: 35,411
- Demonym: Varangaonkar

Language
  - Official: Marathi
- Time zone: UTC+5:30 (IST)
- PIN: 425305
- Telephone code: 02582
- Vehicle registration: MH 19

Varangaon is a town in Jalgaon district of Maharashtra in India. It is situated in Bhusawal taluka.

== Geography ==
A river, Bhogvati, flows through the town. Bhogvati later joins the Tapi River near Bhusaval. The Hatnur Dam, is present 11 km north on the River Tapi, provides water to the town.

== Economics ==
The Ordnance Factory of Varangaon of the Ordnance Factories Board.It manufactures gunpowder and similar military products for the Indian Armed Forces is located in Varangaon. Varangaon railway station falls on the Mumbai–Howrah rail route.

== Demographics ==
AS per Indian census 2011, the population of Varangaon was 35,411. Out of these 18,385 were male and 17,026 were female.

Year	Male	Female	Total Population	Change	Religion (%)							
Year	Male	Female	Total Population	Change	Hindu	Muslim	Christian	Sikhs	Buddhist	Jain	Other religions and persuasions	Religion not stated
2011	18385	17026	35411	-	70.114	19.610	0.384	0.107	8.983	0.661	0.000	0.141

== Religion ==
Nageshwar Temple is situated on the outskirts of the town, which is an ancient Shiva temple. It is believed that the Maratha Sardar Bajirao Peshva paid his tributes to this temple, before marching on to Delhi and the Mughal Sultanate. Muktai Temple of Mehun Muktainagar is also nearby.

== Economy ==
Farming is the main source of income of the majority of the people. Sugarcane, banana, cotton and jowar are the main crops, taken twice a year in both harvests. The fields are irrigated by water from the River Tapi.
