= Sewagram Express =

Train in India

Sewagram Superfast Express
Overview
- Service type: SuperFast
- Locale: Maharashtra
- First service: 18 February 1867; 158 years ago
- Current operator: Central Railway

Route
- Termini: CSMT Mumbai (CSMT); Nagpur Junction (NGP)
- Stops: 26
- Distance travelled: 833 km (518 mi)
- Average journey time: 14 hours 50 minutes
- Service frequency: Daily
- Train number: 12139 / 12140

On-board services
- Classes: AC 2 tier, AC 3 tier, Sleeper Class, General Unreserved
- Seating arrangements: Yes
- Sleeping arrangements: Yes
- Catering facilities: On-board catering, E-catering
- Observation facilities: Large windows
- Baggage facilities: Available

Technical
- Rolling stock: LHB coach
- Track gauge: 1,676 mm (5 ft 6 in)
- Operating speed: 130 km/h (81 mph) maximum, 56 km/h (35 mph) average including halts.
Route map
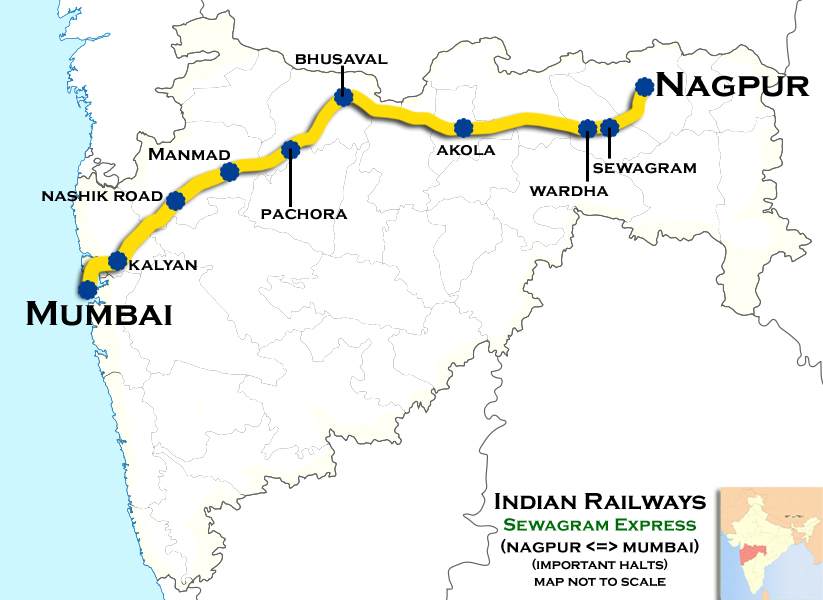

The 12139 / 12140 Sewagram Superfast Express is an Superfast Express train belonging to Indian Railways that runs between Mumbai CSMT and Nagpur Junction in India.

It operates as train number 12139 from Mumbai CSMT to Nagpur Junction and as train number 12140 in the reverse direction.

== Coaches ==
The 12139/40 Mumbai CSMT Nagpur Sewagram Superfast Express presently has 1 AC 2 tier, 3 AC 3 tier, 9 Sleeper Class and 5 General Unreserved coaches.

As with most train services in India, coach composition may be amended at the discretion of Indian Railways depending on demand.

== Service ==
The 12139 Mumbai CSMT Nagpur Sewagram Superfast Express covers the distance of 837 kilometres in 15 hours 10 mins (55.19 km/h) and in 15 hours 00 mins (55.80 km/h) as 12140 Nagpur Mumbai CSMT Sewagram Superfast Express.

== Routeing ==
The 12139/12140 Sewagram Superfast Express runs via Kalyan Junction, Nashik Road, Bhusaval Junction, Akola Junction, Badnera Junction, Wardha Junction to Nagpur Junction.

The slip coaches of the Mumbai CSMT Balharshah are detached/attached at Wardha Junction.

== Traction ==
The train is hauled by an Ajni Loco Shed-based WAP-7 electric locomotive from end to end.

== Time table ==
12139 Mumbai CSMT Nagpur–Sewagram Superfast Express leaves Mumbai CSMT daily at 15:00 hrs IST and reaches Nagpur Junction at 06:10 hrs IST the next day.

12140 Nagpur Mumbai CSMT–Sewagram Superfast Express leaves Nagpur Junction daily at 20:50 hrs IST and reaches Mumbai CSMT at 11:40 hrs IST the next day.

== Gallery ==
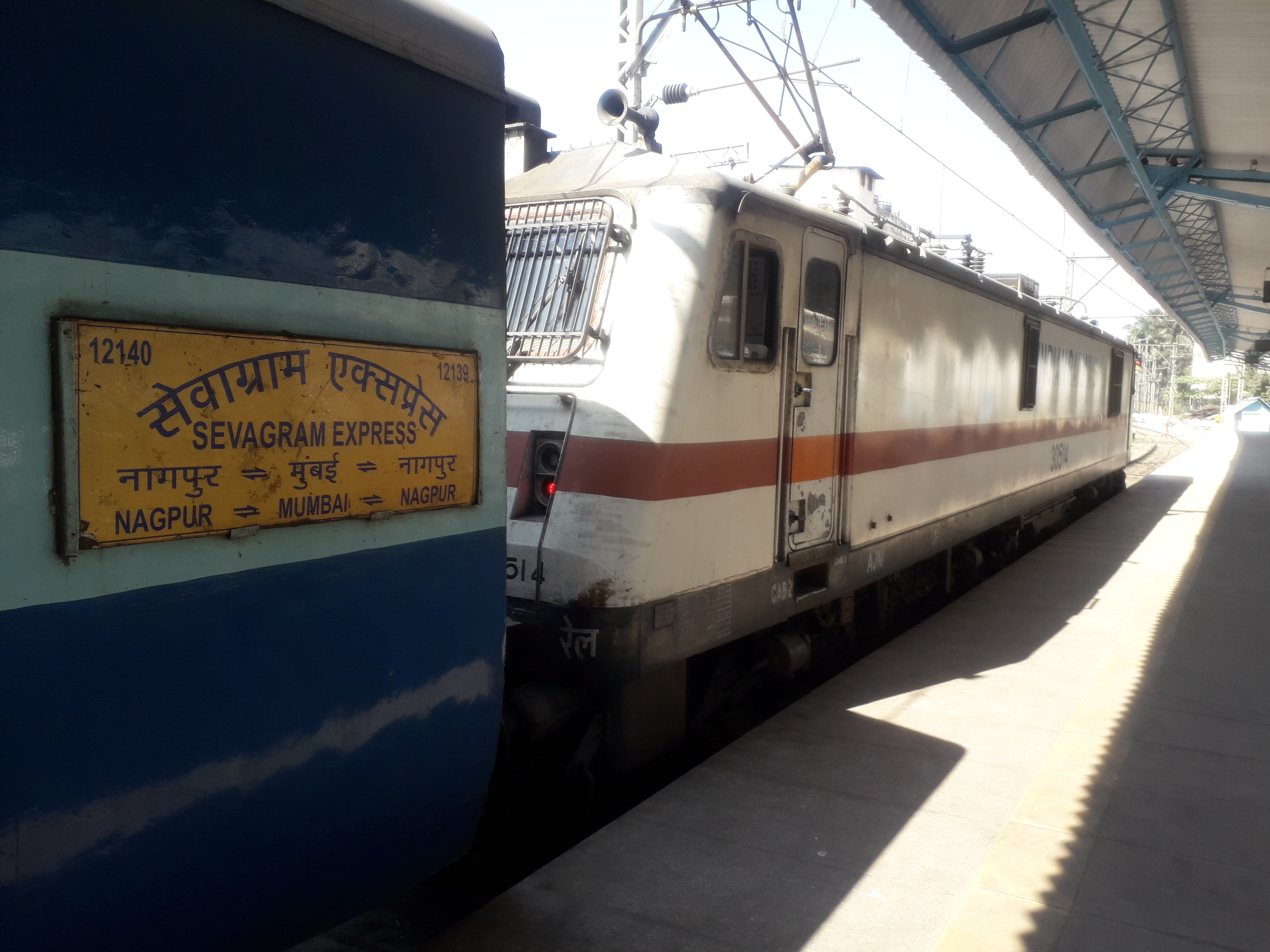
12139 Sewagram Express with Ajni-based WAP-7 locomotive

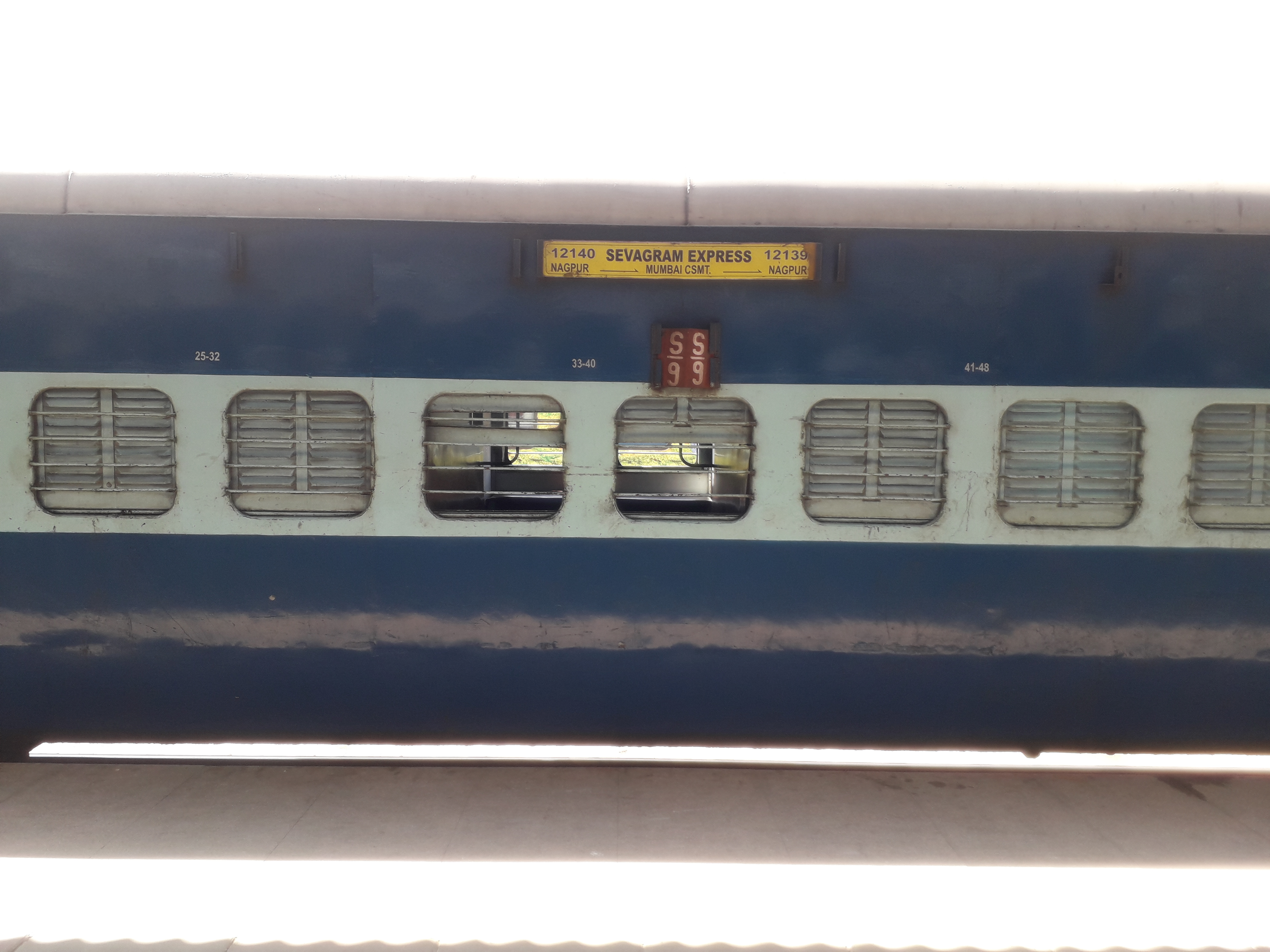
12139 Sewagram Express – Nagpur-bound Sleeper Class coach

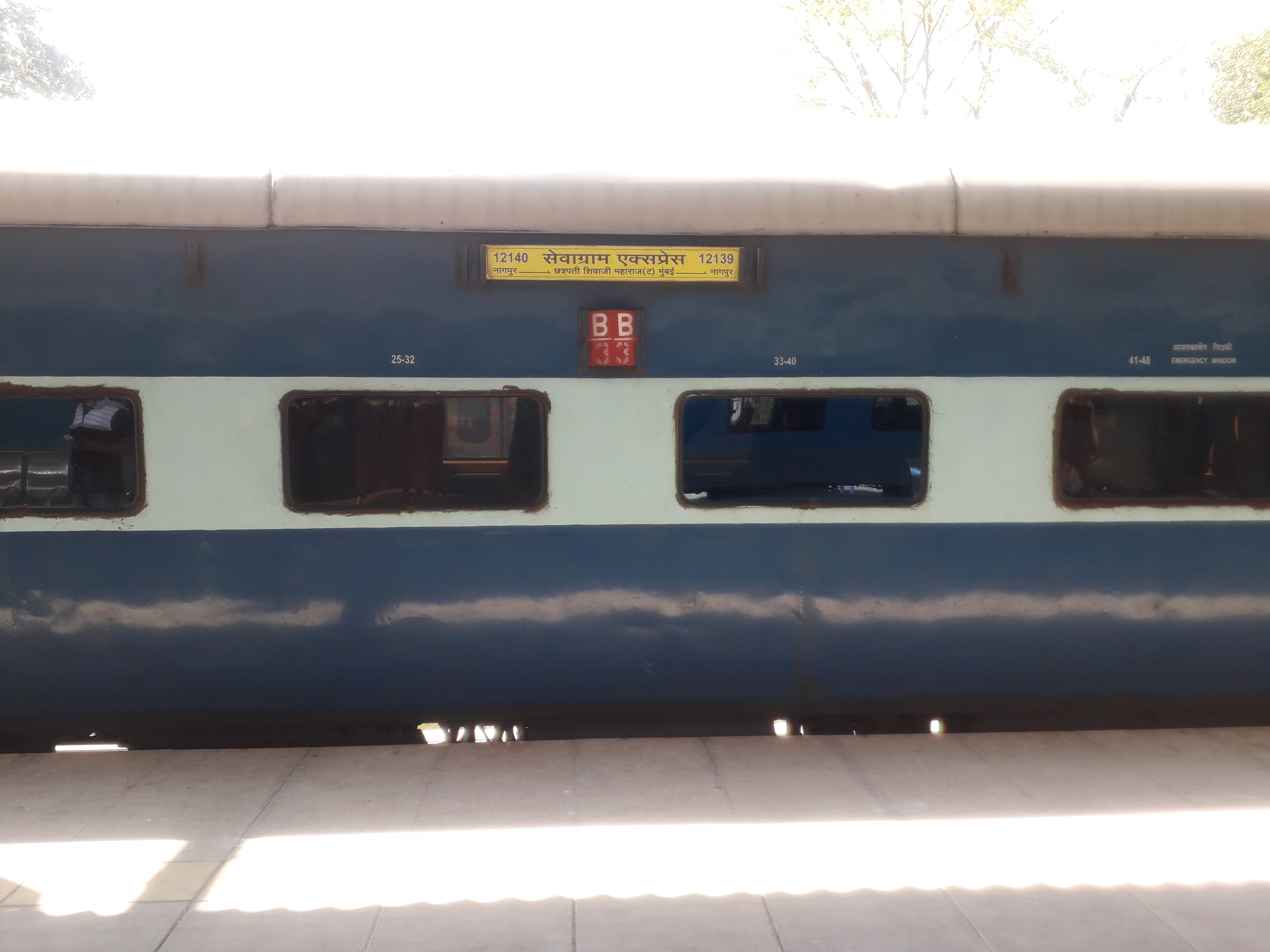
12139 Sewagram Express – Nagpur-bound AC 3 tier coach

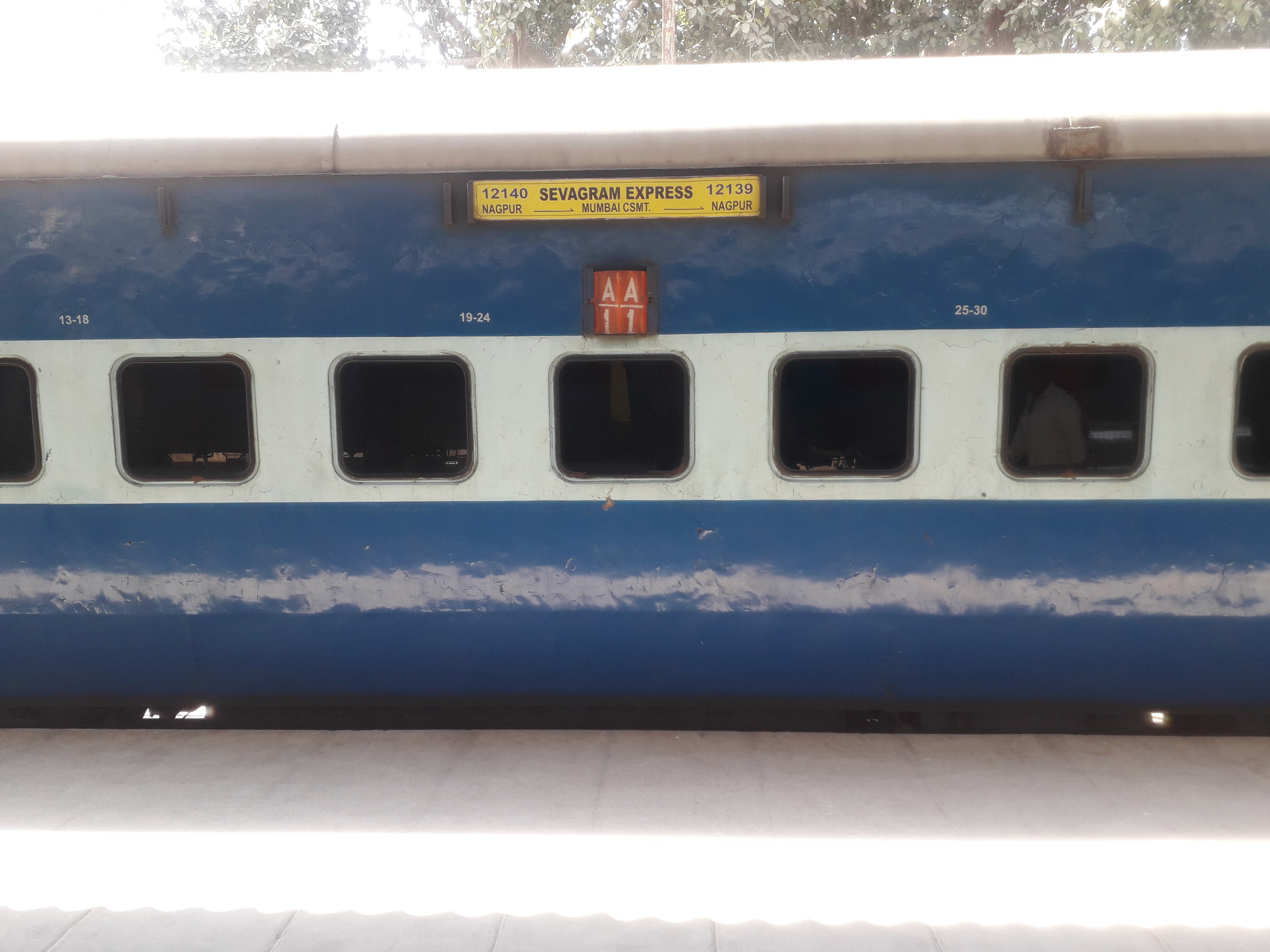
12139 Sewagram Express – Nagpur-bound AC 2 tier coach

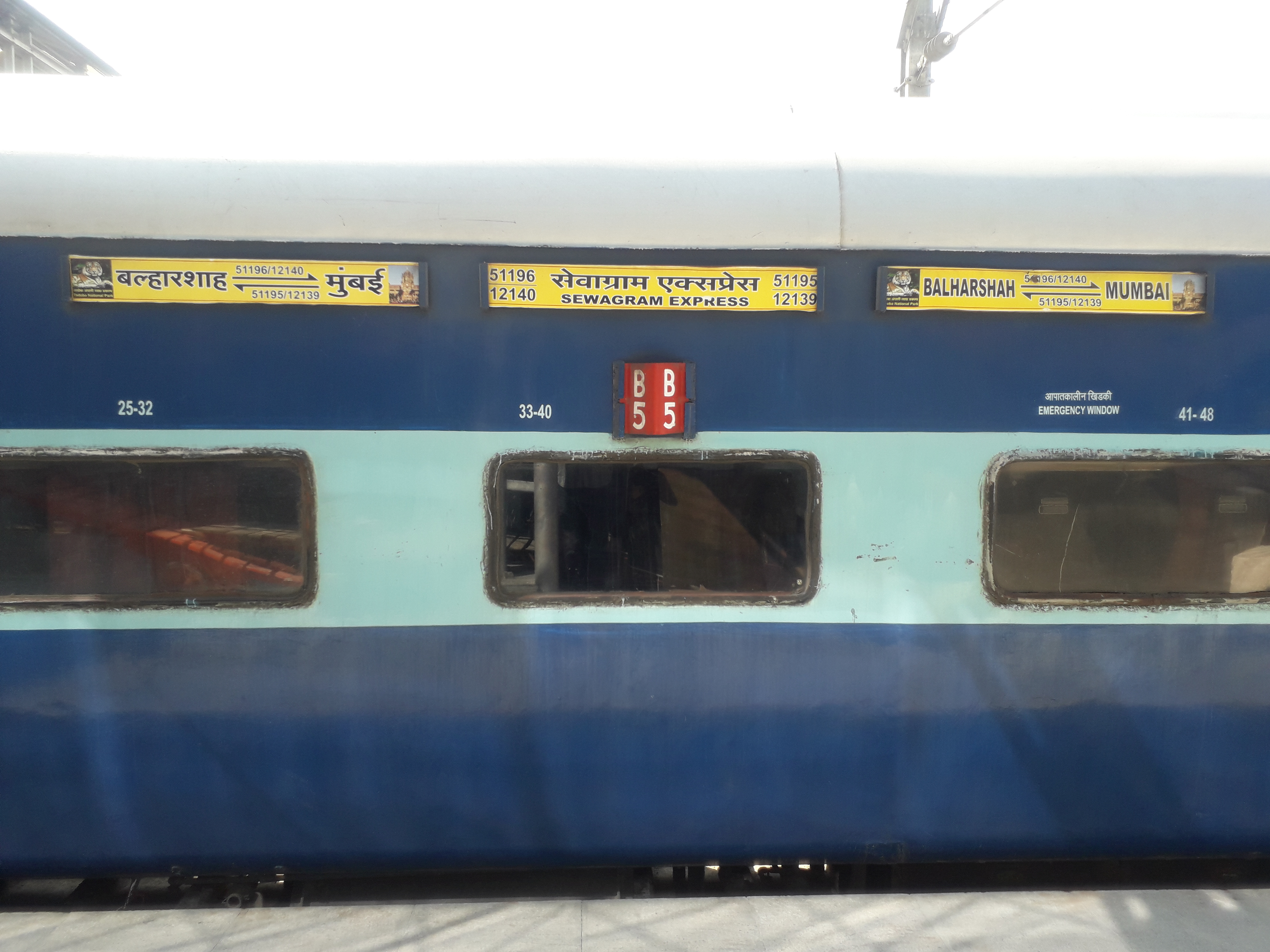
12139 Sewagram Express – Balharshah bound AC 3 tier coach

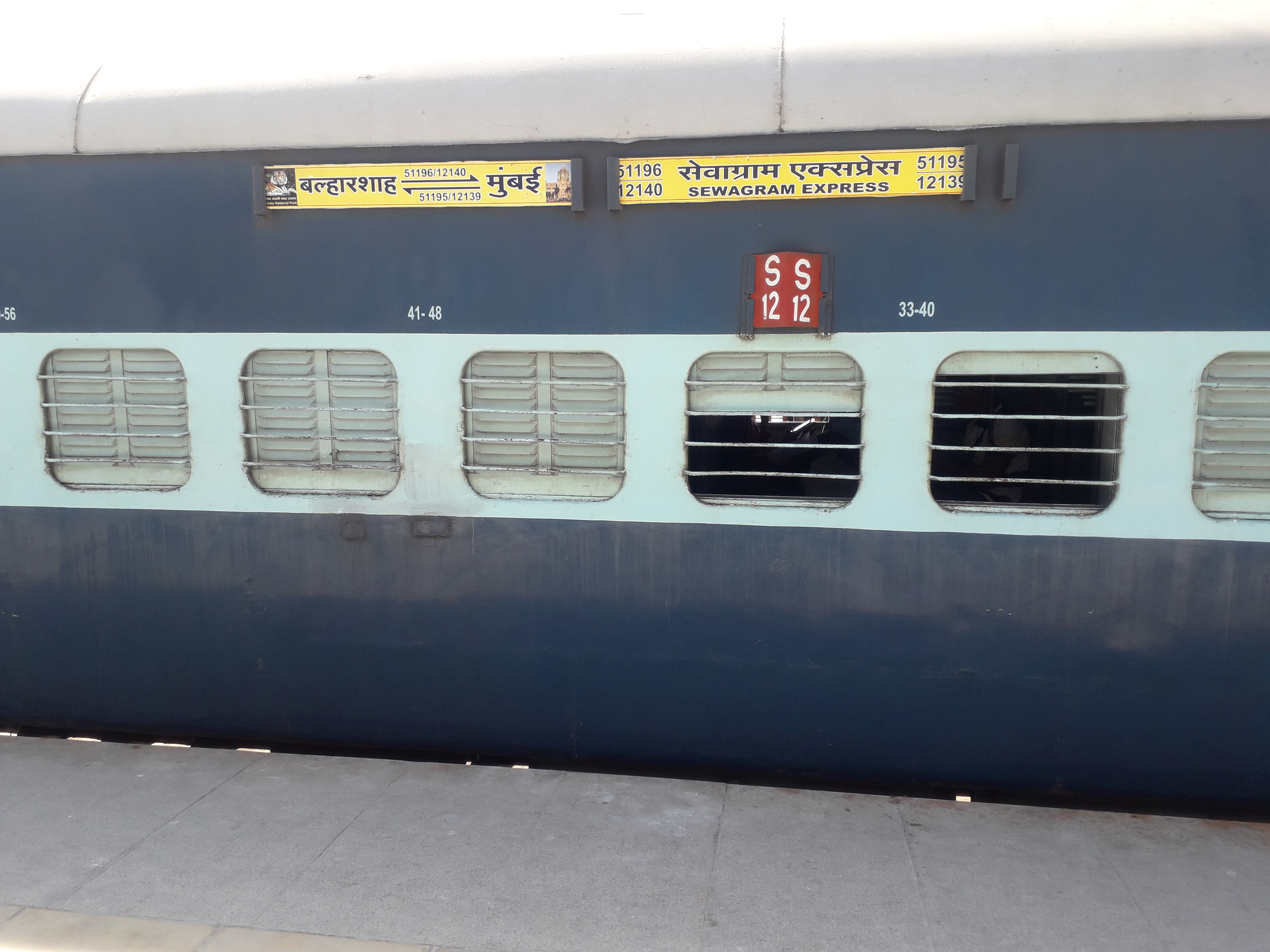
12139 Sewagram Express – Balharshah bound Sleeper Class coach

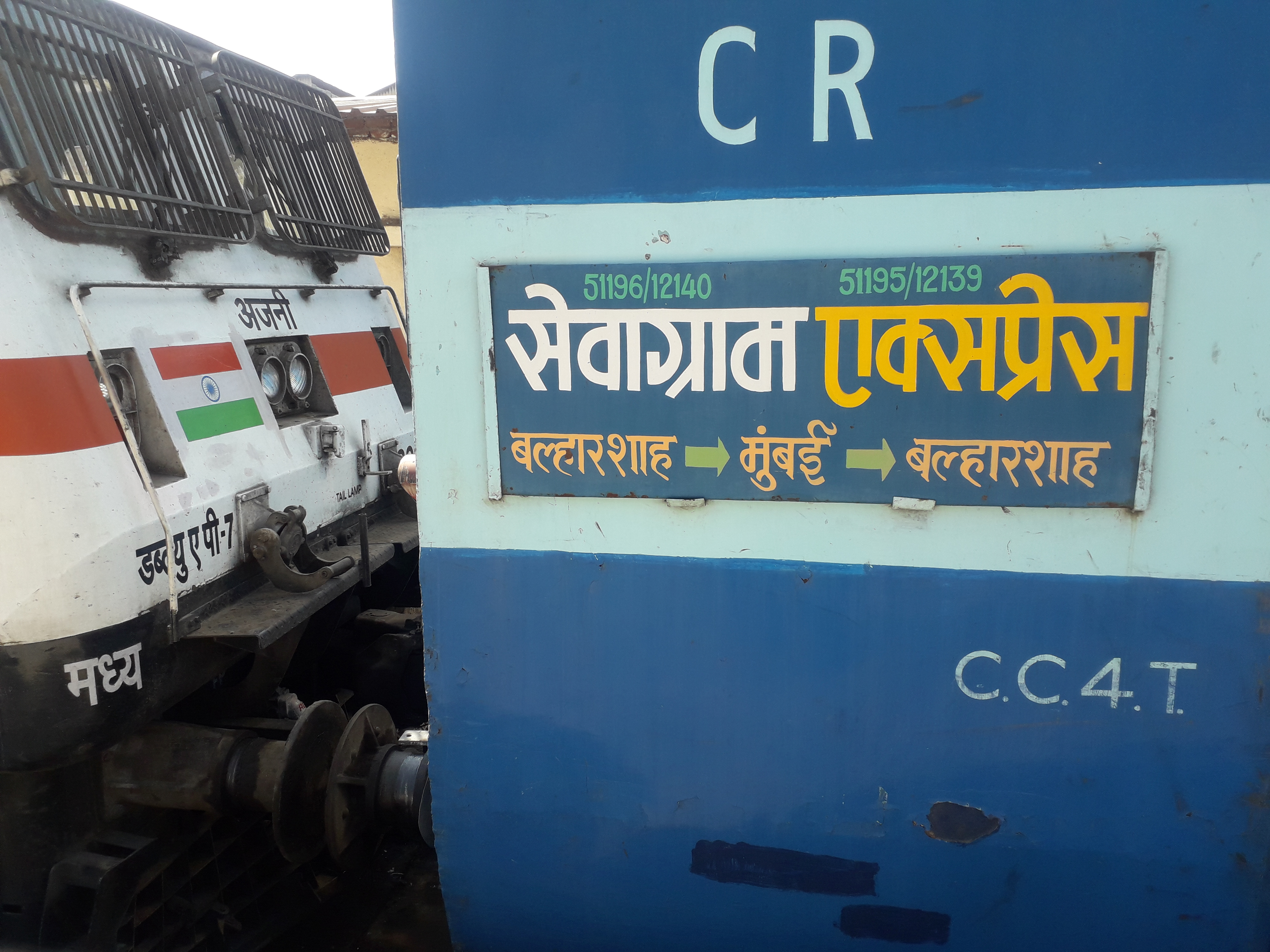
12139 Sewagram Express – Balharshah Train board

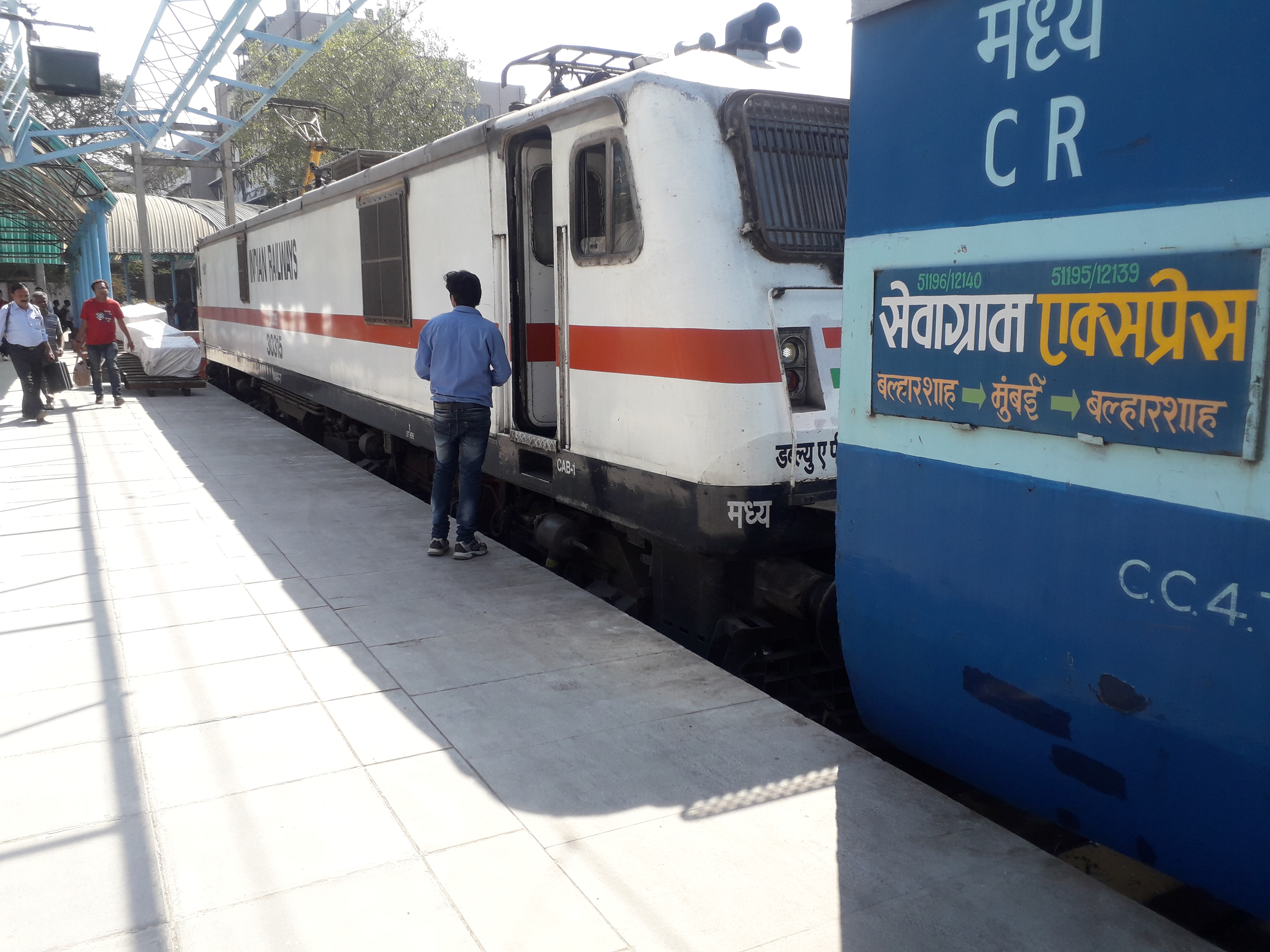
12139 Balharshah Sewagram Express with Ajni-based WAP-7 locomotive
