= Navjeevan Express =

Train in India

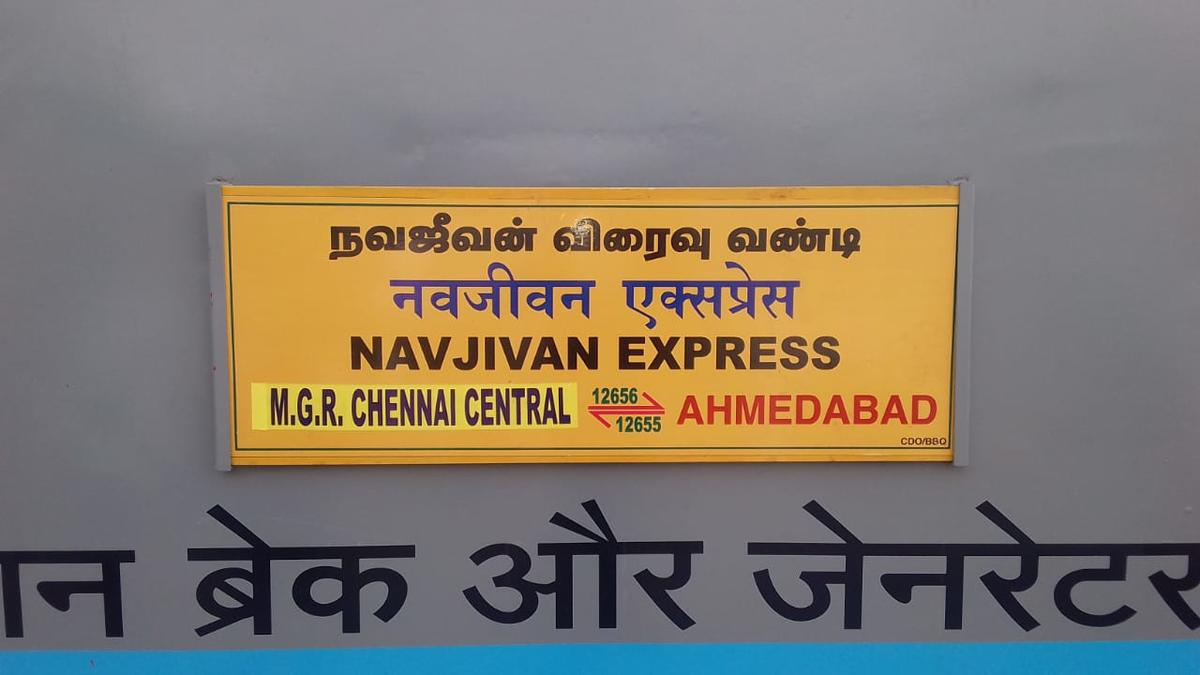
- Navjeevan Express train board.

Overview
- Service type: Superfast Express
- Locale: Tamil Nadu, Andhra Pradesh, Telangana, Maharashtra & Gujarat
- First service: 6 April 1978; 47 years ago
- Current operator: Southern Railway

Route
- Termini: Ahmedabad Junction (ADI); MGR Chennai Central (MAS)
- Stops: 37
- Distance travelled: 1,892 km (1,176 mi)
- Average journey time: 31 hours 50 minutes
- Service frequency: Daily
- Train number: 12655 / 12656

On-board services
- Classes: AC First Class, AC 2 Tier, AC 3 Tier, AC 3 Tier Economy, Sleeper Class, General Unreserved
- Seating arrangements: Yes
- Sleeping arrangements: Yes
- Catering facilities: Available
- Observation facilities: Large windows
- Baggage facilities: Available
- Other facilities: Below the seats

Technical
- Rolling stock: LHB coach
- Track gauge: 1,676 mm (5 ft 6 in); Broad Gauge
- Operating speed: 60 km/h (37 mph) average including halts.
Route map
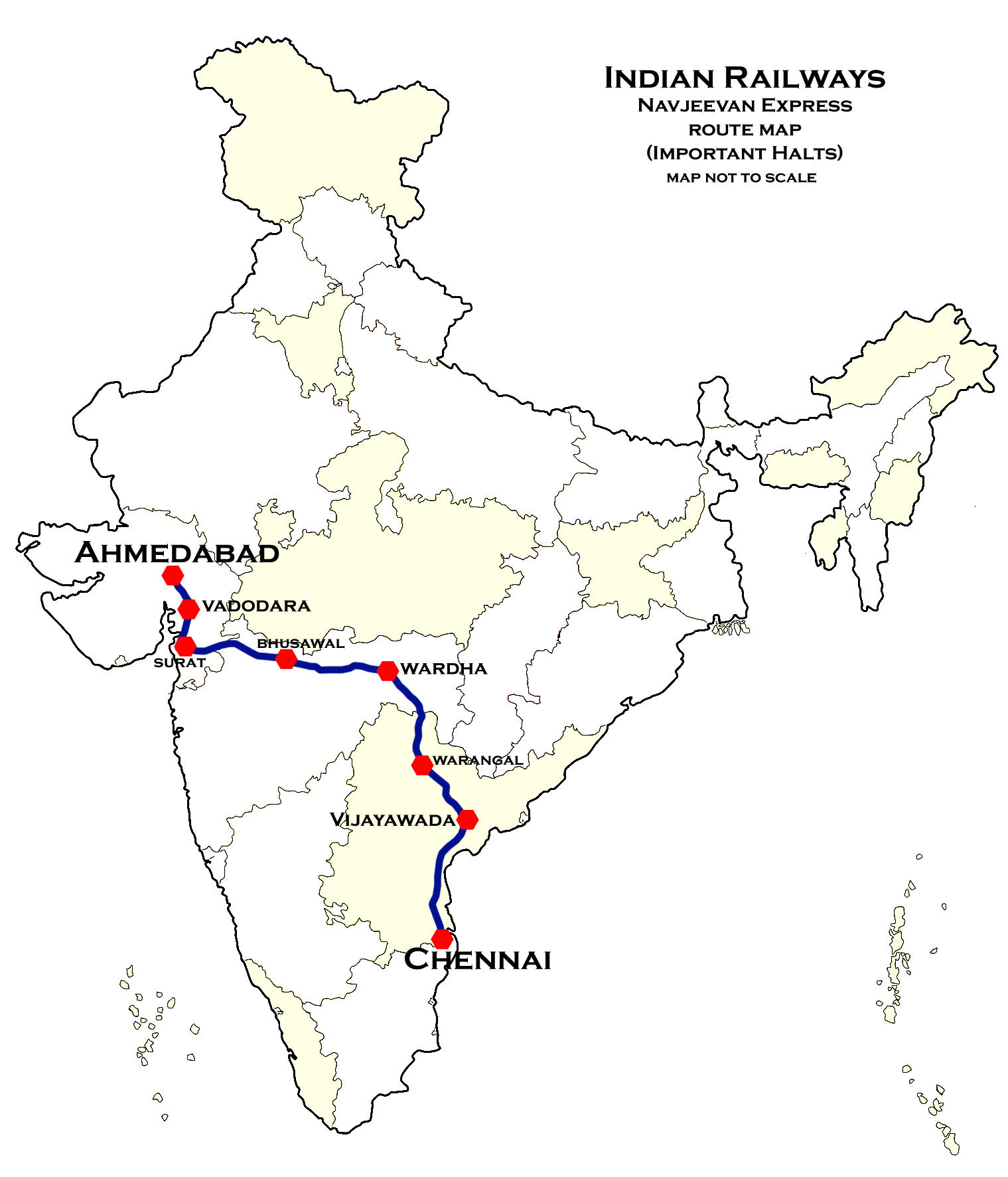

The 12655 / 12656 Navjeevan Express is a superfast express train belonging to Southern Railway zone that runs between Ahmedabad Junction and Chennai Central. It is currently being operated with 12655/12656 train numbers on a daily basis. From November 2, 2019, it runs with highly refurbished LHB coach.

It operates as train number 12655 from Ahmedabad Junction to Chennai Central and as train number 12656 in the reverse direction, serving the states of Gujarat, Maharashtra, Telangana, Andhra Pradesh and Tamil Nadu.

== History ==
It was introduced in 1978 to run between Madras Beach and Ahmedabad Junction on a weekly basis. Originally numbered as 145/146, it departed Madras Beach at 06:00 on Tuesdays and arrived Ahmedabad Junction the next day at 17:30. On its return lap, it departed Ahmedabad Junction on Thursdays at 06:50, and reached Madras Beach the next evening at 19:50.

The train originally ran via Renigunta Junction–Wadi Junction–Daund Junction–Manmad Junction–Jalgaon Junction, but it was later rerouted via Vijayawada Junction–Wardha Junction–Bhusaval Junction. A single AC 2-tier sleeper coach accommodation was introduced in 1984.

== Coach composition ==
The train has highly refurbished LHB coach with max speed of 130 km/h. The train consists of 22 coaches.

- 1 Ends On Generator (EOG)
- 2 Unreserved (UR)
- 1 AC First (HA)
- 1 AC 2 Tier (A)
- 6 AC 3 Tier (B)
- 3 AC 3 Tier Economy (M)
- 6 Sleeper (S)
- 1 Pantry Car (PC)
- 1 Sleeper cum Luggage (SLR)

== Route & halts ==
- Ahmedabad Junction
- Anand Junction
- Vadodara Junction
- Surat
- Nandurbar
- Jalgaon
- Bhusawal
- Badnera Junction
- Wardha Junction
- Balharshah
- Warangal
- Vijayawada Junction
- Tenali Junction
- Bapatla
- Chirala
- Ongole
- Nellore
- Gudur Junction
- Sullurupeta
- MGR Chennai Central

== Traction ==
earlier was Ghaziabad-based WAP-5. It is hauled by a Royapuram Loco Shed or Erode Loco Shed based WAP-7 electric locomotive on its entire journey.
