= Jalgaon Junction railway station =

Railway Station in Maharashtra, India

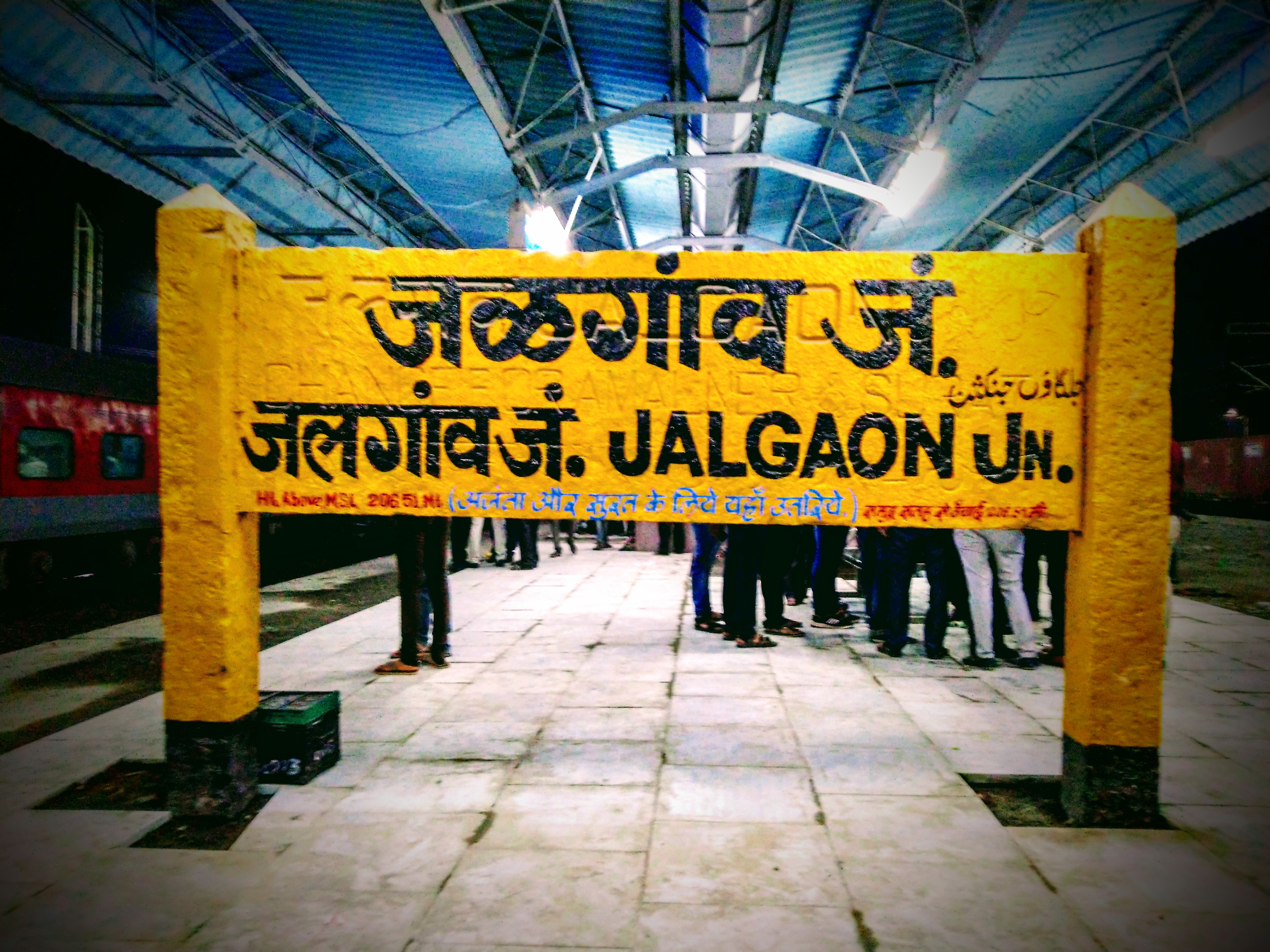
- Jalgaon Junction railway station board

General information
- Location: Jalgaon; India
- Coordinates: 21°01′06″N 75°33′47″E
- Elevation: 213 metres (699 ft)
- System: Indian Railways junction station
- Owner: Indian Railways
- Operator: Central Railway
- Lines: Bhusawal–Kalyan section, Howrah–Nagpur–Mumbai line, Howrah–Allahabad–Mumbai line, Udhna–Jalgaon line, Jalgaon-Jalna
- Platforms: 6

Construction
- Structure type: Standard, on ground
- Parking: Available

Other information
- Status: Active
- Station code: JL
- Division(s): Bhusawal

History
- Opened: 1860
- Electrified: 1968–69

Services
Preceding station	Indian Railways	Following station
shirsoli towards ?	Central Railway zone Howrah–Nagpur–Mumbai line	Bhadli towards ?
Paldhi towards ?	Western Railway zone Udhna-Jalgaon line	Bhadli towards ?
Location
- Location within Maharashtra

Jalgaon Junction railway station serves Jalgaon in Jalgaon district in the Indian state of Maharashtra.

== History ==
The first train in India travelled from Mumbai to Thane on 16 April 1853. By May 1854, Great Indian Peninsula Railway's Bombay–Thane line was extended to Kalyan Junction. Service up to Bhusaval Junction was started in 1860.

=== Electrification ===
The Jalgaon–Bhusawal section was electrified in 1968–69.

== Amenities ==
Amenities at Jalgaon railway station include: computerized reservation office, subscriber trunk dialling/public call office booth, a public waiting room, an ATM, auto stand near by which connects to the City centre, rest room, elevators, escalators, vegetarian and non-vegetarian refreshments, and a book stall with paid service.

== Other ==
Ajanta Caves are 50 kilometres (31 mi) from Jalgaon. Buses and taxis are available at Jalgaon for visiting Ajanta.

== Prominent Trains ==
1. Ajni (Nagpur)–Pune Vande Bharat Express
2. Mumbai CSMT–Hazrat Nizamuddin Rajdhani Express
3. Lokmanya Tilak Terminus–Saharsa Amrit Bharat Express
4. Udhna (Surat)–Brahmapur Amrit Bharat Express
5. Panvel–Alipurduar Amrit Bharat Express
6. Banaras–Hadapsar (Pune) Amrit Bharat Express
7. Lokmanya Tilak Terminus–Ayodhya Cantonment Amrit Bharat Express
8. Marathwada Sampark Kranti Express
9. Punjab Mail

Preceding station	Indian Railways	Following station
Tarshod towards Nagpur-Howrah towards ?	Central Railway zone Howrah–Nagpur–Mumbai line, Howrah–Allahabad–Mumbai line, New Delhi–Bhopal–Mumbai line	Shirsholi Towards Manmad-Mumbai towards ?
Terminus	Central Railway zone Udhna–Jalgaon line	Paldhi toward Udhana -Surat towards ?
