= Wardha Junction railway station =

Railway station in Maharashtra, India

Wardha Junction
- Indian Railways logo

General information
- Location: State Highway 3, Wardha, Maharashtra; India
- Coordinates: 20°43′59″N 78°35′41″E
- Elevation: 246.90 metres (810.0 ft)
- System: Indian Railways junction station
- Owner: Indian Railways
- Operator: Central Railway
- Lines: Howrah–Nagpur–Mumbai line Wardha–Chitoda line Wardha–Nanded line
- Platforms: 4
- Tracks: 10

Construction
- Structure type: At ground
- Parking: Available

Other information
- Status: Functioning
- Station code: WR
- Division(s): Nagpur

History
- Opened: 1867
- Electrified: 1990–1991

Services
Preceding station	Indian Railways	Following station
Sevagram Junction towards ?	Central Railway zone Howrah–Nagpur–Mumbai line	Dahegaon towards ?
Terminus	Central Railway zone Wardha–Chitoda line	Chitoda Junction towards ?
Location
- Location within Maharashtra Location within India

Wardha Junction railway station is a railway station serving Wardha city in the Wardha district, Maharashtra, India. The station is under the Nagpur railway division of the Central Railway zone of Indian Railways. Wardha Junction is an important station on the Howrah–Nagpur–Mumbai line and Wardha–Chitoda line.

It is located at 246 m above sea level and has 4 platforms. As of 2016, 90 trains stopped at the station, of which two trains (Wardha–Balharshah passenger and Wardha–Bhusaval passenger) start/end there.

== History ==
The first passenger train in India traveled from Mumbai to Thane on 16 April 1853. By May 1854, the Great Indian Peninsula Railway (GIPR) Bombay–Thane line had been extended to Kalyan. Bhusawal Railway station was built in 1860, and in 1867 the GIPR branch line was extended to Nagpur.

Before the establishment of Sevagram railway station, north–south-bound trains needed to have their engines reversed to travel in the opposite direction, which was a time-consuming process. To avoid this problem, a new station for halting north–south-bound trains was established in 1985; this became Sevagram railway station. Since 1985, trains running on New Delhi–Chennai main line halt at Sevagram and bypass Wardha entirely.

The railways in the Badnera–Wardha sector were electrified in 1990–1991.

The Wardha station is equipped with new Route Relay Interlocking (RRI) for faster train operation.

== Amenities ==
Amenities at Wardha railway station include: computerized reservation office, waiting room, retiring room, vegetarian and non-vegetarian refreshments, and a book stall. In recent years, the station has been modernised and renovated under the station redevelopment programme of Indian Railways. The waiting area has been developed on one side of the station and the foundation laid for a monumental flag at the station premises.

A new fully air-conditioned waiting hall has been built for travellers in the station. As of 2021, development is in progress for upgrading the VIP room. New stainless steel benches will be provided on the station platforms with funding from the Members of Parliament Local Area Development Scheme. New LED coach guidance boards will be installed along with additional lifts.

== Gallery ==
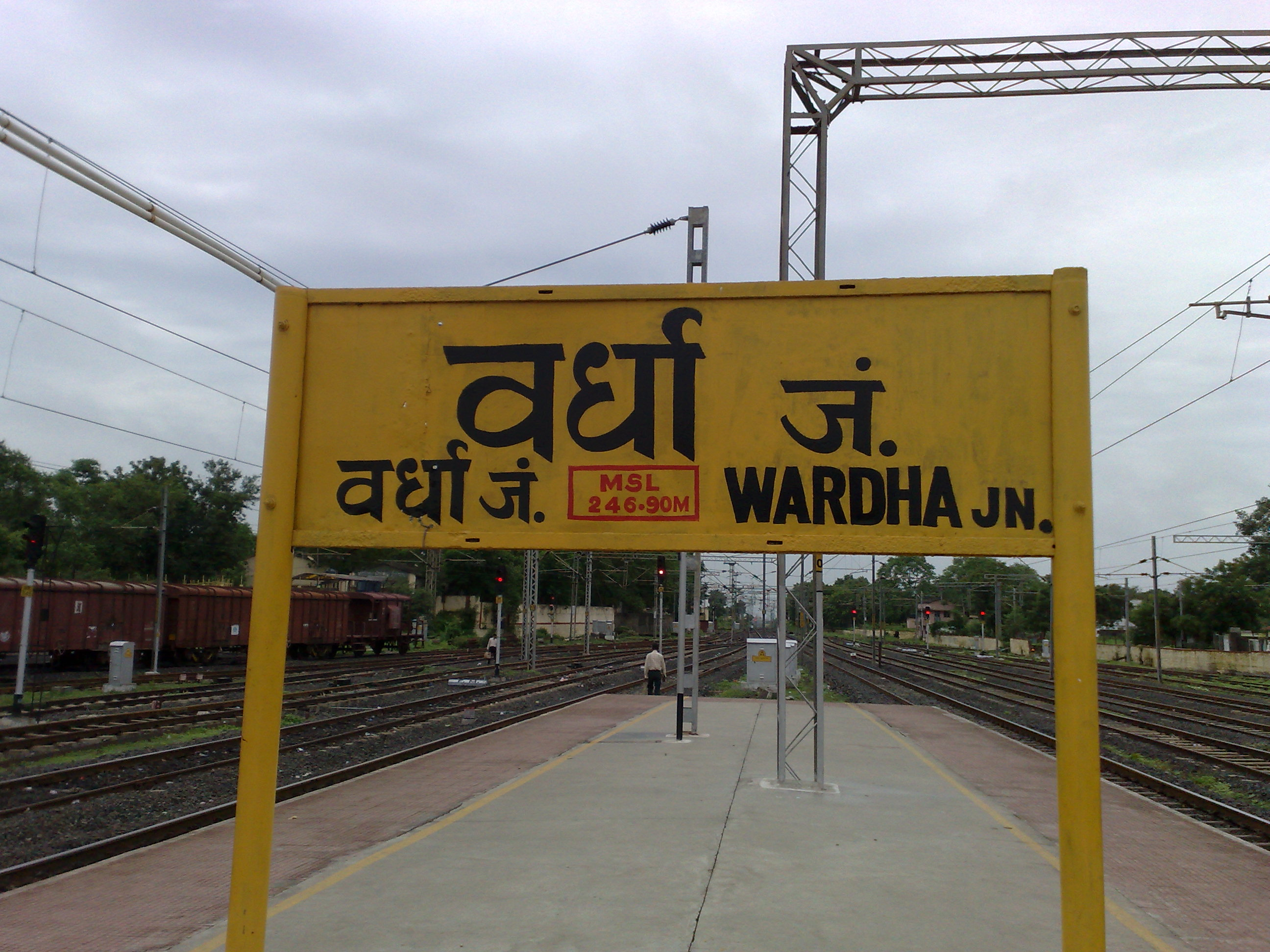
Wardha Junction
