= Howrah–Ahmedabad Superfast Express =

Train in India

Overview
- Service type: Superfast
- Locale: West Bengal, Jharkhand, Orissa, Chhattisgarh, Maharashtra & Gujarat
- Current operator: South Eastern Railway

Route
- Termini: Howrah (HWH); Ahmedabad (ADI)
- Stops: 62
- Distance travelled: 2,087 km (1,297 mi)
- Average journey time: 37 hours 35 minutes
- Service frequency: Daily
- Train number: 12833 / 12834

On-board services
- Classes: AC 2 Tier, AC 3 Tier, Sleeper Class, General Unreserved
- Seating arrangements: Yes
- Sleeping arrangements: Yes
- Catering facilities: Available
- Observation facilities: Large windows
- Baggage facilities: No
- Other facilities: Below the seats

Technical
- Rolling stock: LHB coach
- Track gauge: 1,676 mm (5 ft 6 in)
- Operating speed: 130 km/h (81 mph) maximum, 56 km/h (35 mph) average including halts.
Route map
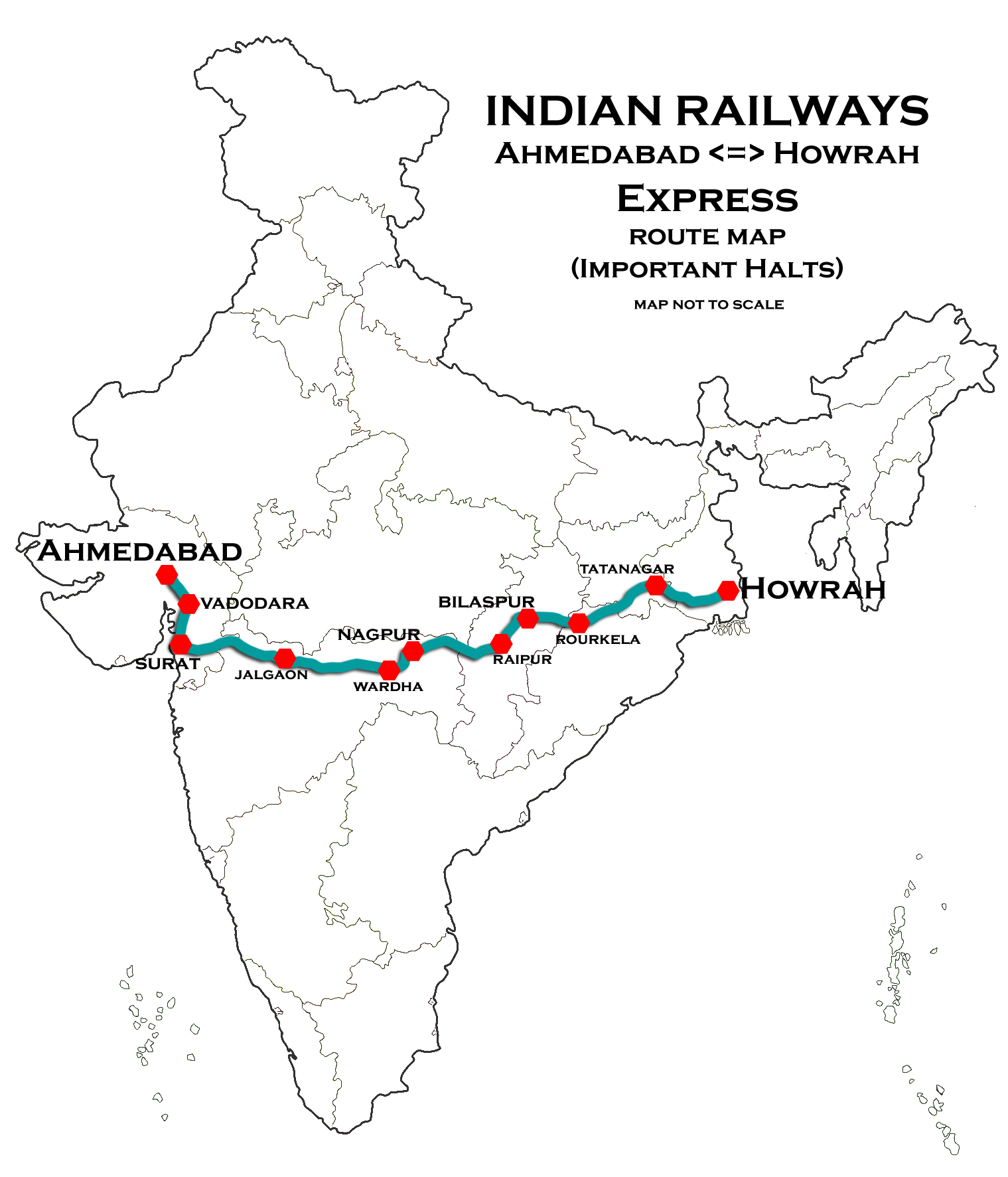

The 12833 / 12834 Howrah–Ahmedabad Superfast Express is a superfast express train belonging to Indian Railways that runs between Howrah and Ahmedabad Junction in India.

It operates as train number 12834 from Howrah to Ahmedabad and as train number 12833 in the reverse direction.

It connect states of West Bengal, Odisha, Jharkhand, Chhattisgarh, Maharashtra and Gujarat.

== Coaches ==
The 12834/33 Howrah–Ahmedabad Superfast Express presently has 3 AC 2 tier, 8 AC 3 tier, 5 Sleeper class, 2 General Unreserved coaches, 1 pantry car, 1 Seating cum Luggage coach & 1 EOG cum luggage coach.

As with most train services in India, coach composition may be amended at the discretion of Indian Railways depending on demand.

== Service ==
The 12834 Howrah–Ahmedabad Superfast Express covers the distance of 2087 kilometres in 37 hours 05 mins (56.28 km/h) & in 37 hours 35 mins (55.53 km/h) as 12833 Ahmedabad–Howrah Superfast Express.

As the average speed of the train is above 55 km/h, as per Indian Railways rules, its fare includes a Superfast surcharge.

== Schedule ==
- 12833 leaves Ahmedabad Junction daily at night 12:15 AM and reaches Howrah on 2nd day at afternoon 1:30 PM
- 12834 leaves Howrah daily at 11:55 PM and reaches Ahmedabad Junction on 3rd day at afternoon 1:35 PM

== Routeing ==
The 12834/33 Howrah–Ahmedabad Superfast Express runs via Kharagpur Junction, Rourkela Junction, Bilaspur Junction, Raipur Junction, Nagpur Junction, Bhusaval Junction, Nandurbar, Surat & Vadodara Junction.

== Traction ==
It is hauled by a Santragachi Loco Shed / Vadodara Loco Shed based WAP-7 electric locomotive from end to end.
