= Nandurbar railway station =

Railway Station in Maharashtra, India

Nandurbar

General information
- Location: Nandurbar, Maharashtra 425412; India
- Coordinates: 21.37408182°N 74.24453259°E
- System: Express train and Passenger train station
- Owner: Indian Railways
- Operator: Western Railway zone
- Line: Udhna–Jalgaon line
- Platforms: 4
- Tracks: 7

Construction
- Structure type: At–grade
- Parking: Yes
- Cycle facilities: Yes

Other information
- Status: Active
- Station code: NDB
- Fare zone: Mumbai WR

History
- Opened: 1899; 127 years ago
- Electrified: 2002–03
- Former names: Great Indian Peninsula Railway
Location
- Location within Maharashtra Location within India

Nandurbar railway station serves the city of Nandurbar in Nandurbar district in the Indian state of Maharashtra.

== History ==
The Tapi Valley Railway was originally constructed by Killick Nixon Co. and taken over by 'the former B.B. and C.I. Railway, on 31 April 1942. Section from Udha to Vyara was constructed in 1898, from Vyara to Nandurbar in 1899 and from Nandurbar to Jalgaon in 1900. Track is laid with 75 lbs. R. rail on CST 9 sleepers with the density of N. plus 2. The entire line is ballasted with stone ballast. Maximum ruling; gradient on this section is 1 in 200 and the sharpest curve is of 1,910 feet radius. The terrain from where the line is passing is a flat one, it being taken generally parallel to the Tapi river. The entire line is broad gauge with single line up to Jalgaon. There are two important bridges on this line in the district, one near mile 157 on the Bori river and another near mile 186 on the Girna river. Length of the former is about 60' and that of the latter about 170'.

It enters Jalgaon district from Dhulia district just after Betawad station at mile 147. The total route mileage under this section is about 46. Jalgaon station is not under Western Railway whose limit terminates at mile 189. From Jalgaon to Bhusawal it runs common with the Bombay–Bhusawal railway line.

== Electrification ==
Electrification of Nandurbar and Dondaicha railway track had completed in 2002–2003.
