= Howrah–Nagpur–Mumbai line =

Indian railway route

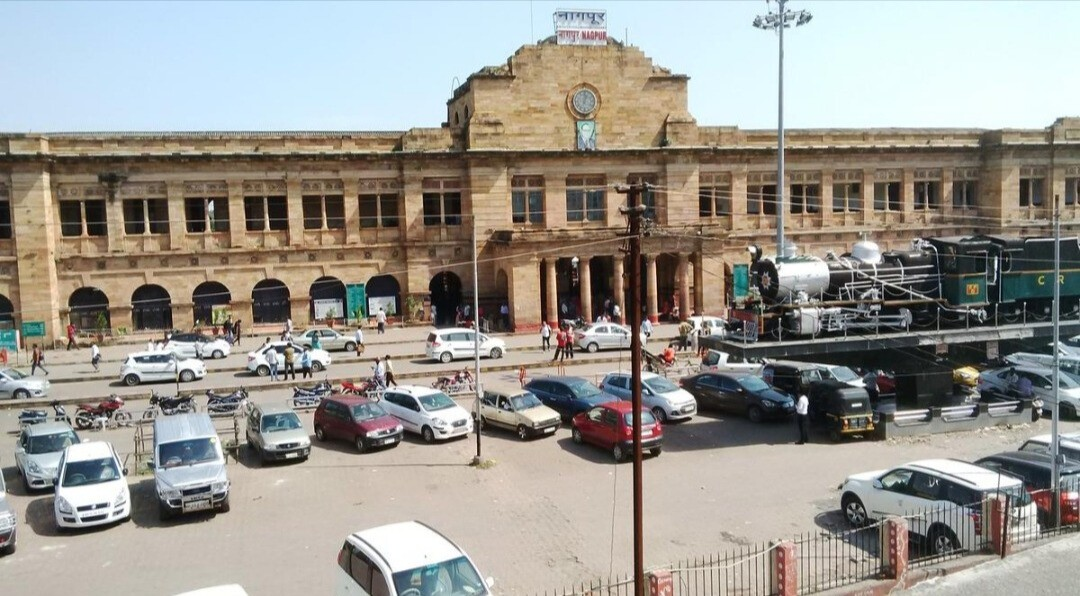
- Nagpur Junction is An Important Railway Station On Howrah–Nagpur–Mumbai Line

Overview
- Status: Functioning
- Owner: Indian Railways
- Locale: Indian states of West Bengal, Jharkhand, Odisha, Chhattisgarh, Maharashtra
- Termini: Howrah; Mumbai CST

Service
- Services: Fast
- Operator(s): South Eastern Railway, South East Central Railway, Central Railway

History
- Opened: 1890; 136 years ago

Technical
- Line length: 1,968 km (1,223 mi)
- Number of tracks: 2/3/4
- Track gauge: 5 ft 6 in (1,676 mm) broad gauge
- Electrification: Yes
- Operating speed: up to 130 km/h

The Howrah–Nagpur–Mumbai line (also known as Mumbai–Kolkata line) is a railway line in India connecting Kolkata and Mumbai via Nagpur. The 1,968-kilometre-long (1,223 mi) railway line was opened to traffic in 1900.

== Sections ==
The 1,968-kilometre-long (1,223 mi) trunk line has been treated in more detail in smaller sections:

1. Howrah–Kharagpur section
2. Kharagpur–Tatanagar section
3. Tatanagar–Bilaspur section
4. Bilaspur–Nagpur section
5. Nagpur–Bhusawal section
6. Bhusawal–Kalyan section
7. Kalyan–Mumbai CST section

== Geography ==
The Howrah–Nagpur–Mumbai line cuts across the central parts of India in an east–west direction and traverses the plains of lower West Bengal, the southern part of Chota Nagpur Plateau, the Deccan Plateau, the Western Ghats and finally the Western Coastal Plains.

== History ==
The first train in India travelled from Bori Bunder in Bombay to Tannah (current Thane) on 16 April 1853. By May 1854, Great Indian Peninsula Railway's Bombay–Tannah line was extended to Callian (current Kalyan). Bhusawal station was set up in 1860 and in 1867 the GIPR branch line was extended to Nagpur.

While the entire Mumbai–Nagpur line was 5 ft 6 in (1,676 mm) broad gauge, the next part from Nagpur to Rajnandgaon was metre gauge. The Nagpur Chhattisgarh Railway started construction of the 240 km (149 mi) Nagpur–Rajnandgaon section in 1878, after surveys were started in 1871. The Nagpur–Tumsar Road section was opened in April 1880 and the Tumsar Road–Rajnandgaon section in December 1880.

The GIPR and EIR, working jointly, completed the Howrah–Allahabad–Mumbai line thereby establishing a connection between Kolkata and Mumbai in 1870. The great famine of 1878 was an impetus for the fast completion of the Nagpur–Chhattisgarh railway track, but by then the idea of a route from Mumbai to Kolkata, shorter than the one via Allahabad, had set in.

The Bengal Nagpur Railway was formed in 1871. Amongst its major objectives were taking over of the Nagpur Chhattisgarh Railway and its conversion to broad gauge and extension of its system by a 772 km (480 mi) line to Asansol on EIR's main line. The entire task was completed by 1891 and Nagpur was connected to Asansol. However, the line via Asansol was never seriously used as a link to Howrah for passenger traffic.

The Sini–Kharagpur–Kolaghat line was opened in 1898–99. The Kolaghat–Howrah section was completed in 1899–1900. The entire line was opened with the completion of the bridge across the Rupnarayan River, near Kolaghat, on 19 April 1900.

== Electrification ==
The electrification of the entire line was done in stages. The Victoria Terminus–Igatpuri section was electrified in 1930 with 1500 V DC traction. Rest of the sections were electrified later, with 25 kV AC traction. Only the entire line became fully electrified by early 1992 after the Durg–Nagpur section was electrified during 1989-92.

== Speed limits ==
The entire Howrah–Nagpur–Mumbai line is planned to be upgraded as a "Group A" line which will enable it to take speeds up to 160 kmph. Its current speed is restricted at 130kmph. Rest are under 110 kmph.

== Passenger movement ==
Howrah (Kolkata), Kharagpur, Tatanagar, Rourkela, Bilaspur, Raipur, Durg, Nagpur, Badnera, Akola, Bhusawal, Nasik Road, Manmad and Kalyan (Mumbai subarban) on this line, are amongst the top hundred booking stations of Indian railway.

== Golden Quadrilateral ==
The Howrah–Nagpur–Mumbai line is a part of the Golden Quadrilateral. The routes connecting the four major metropolises (New Delhi, Mumbai, Chennai and Kolkata), along with their diagonals, known as the Golden Quadrilateral, carry about half the freight and nearly half the passenger traffic, although they form only 16 per cent of the length.

== Popular trains on this route ==
1. Mumbai CSMT–Howrah Duronto Express
2. Mumbai CSMT–Nagpur Duronto Express
3. Howrah–Mumbai CSMT Mail (via Nagpur)
4. Gitanjali Express
5. Jnaneswari Express
6. Shalimar–Lokmanya Tilak Terminus Express
7. Howrah–Mumbai CSMT Weekly Express
