= Mumbai WR railway division =

Railway division of India

Mumbai WR railway division is one of the six railway divisions under the jurisdiction of Western Railway zone of the Indian Railways. This railway division was formed on 5 November 1951 and its headquarter is located at Mumbai Central, Mumbai in the state of Maharashtra of India.

Vadodara railway division, Ahmedabad railway division, Bhavnagar railway division, Rajkot railway division and Ratlam railway division are the other five railway divisions under WR Zone headquartered at Churchgate, Mumbai.

== List of railway stations and towns ==
The list includes the stations under the Mumbai Central railway division and their station category.

Category of station	No. of stations	Names of stations
A-1	3	Mumbai Central, Bandra Terminus, Surat
A	4	Navsari, Udhna Junction, Vapi, Valsad
B	-	-
C suburban station	36	-
D	-	-
E	-	-
F halt station	-	-
Total	116	-
