= Udhna–Jalgaon line =

Rail line in India

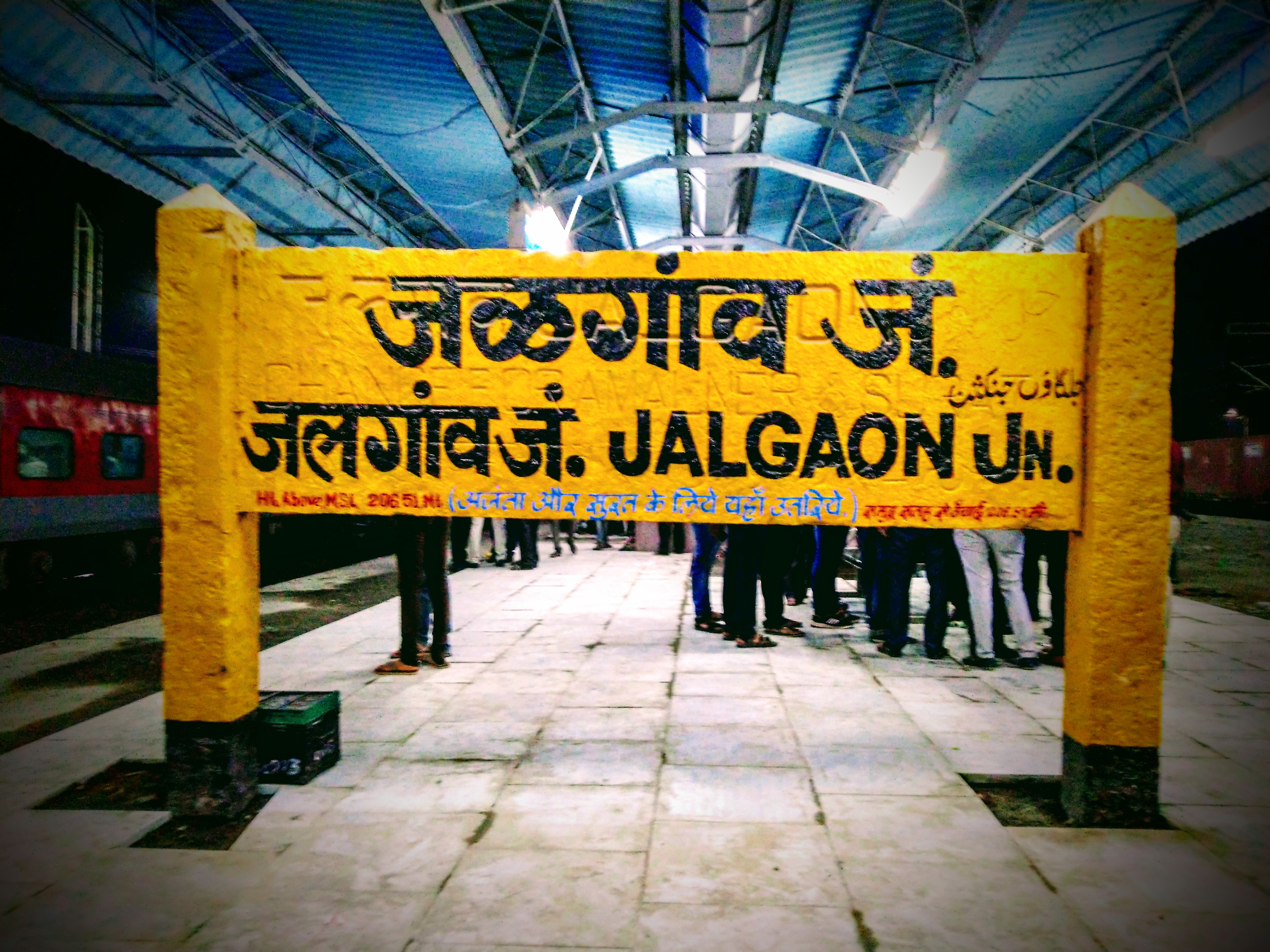
- Jalgaon Junction (important railway station on Udhna–Jalgaon line)

Overview
- Status: Operational
- Owner: Indian Railways
- Locale: Gujarat; Maharashtra
- Termini: Udhna Junction; Jalgaon Junction
- Stations: Udhana Junction, Vyara, Ukai Songadh, Nandurbar, Dondaicha, Amalner, Dharangaon, Jalgaon Junction.

Service
- Type: Indian Railways branch line
- System: Double electric line
- Operator(s): Western Railway

Technical
- Track length: 307 km (191 mi)
- Number of tracks: 2 (Double)
- Track gauge: 1,676 mm (5 ft 6 in)
- Electrification: Yes
- Operating speed: 110 kilometres per hour (68 mph)

The Udhna–Jalgaon line is part of the Howrah–Prayagraj–Mumbai line. It connects Surat and Jalgaon in the Indian states of Gujarat and Maharashtra. Vyara (VYA) is the nearest railway station to Kakrapar Atomic Power Station and Ukai Dam and Ukai Thermal Power Station. This line is one of the branch lines of Bhusawal–Kalyan section.</references>

== History ==
The total length of this section is 307 kilometres (191 mi), which includes a total of 43 stations. The line includes a double-line system, with electric traction.
