= Bhusaval Junction railway station =

Railway station in India

Bhusaval Junction
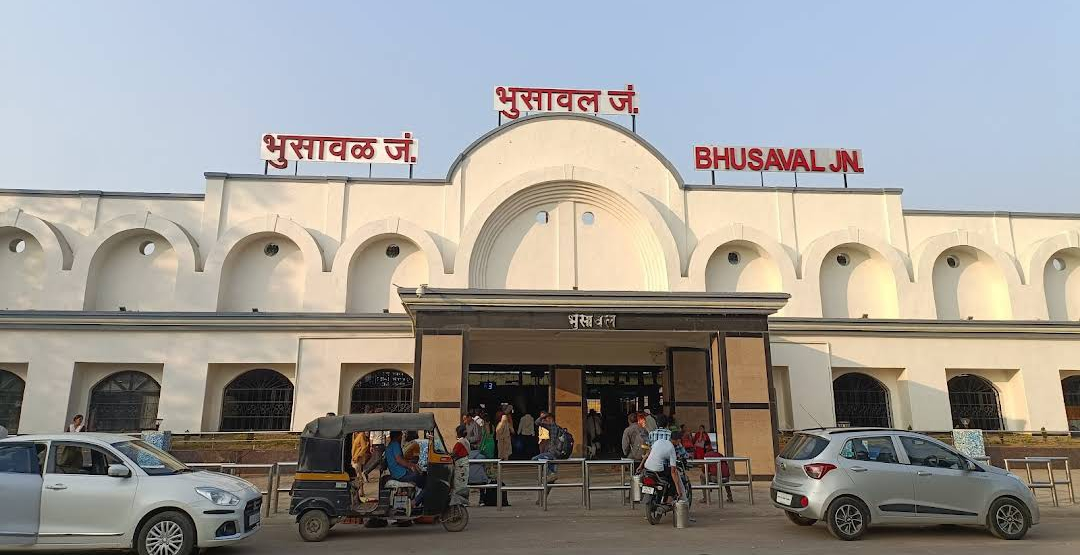

General information
- Location: Near MSRTC Bus Stand, Bhusawal, Maharashtra, PIN 425201; India
- Coordinates: 21.0469°N 75.788°E
- Elevation: 205.030 metres (672.67 ft)
- System: Regional rail, Light rail & commuter rail
- Owner: Indian Railways
- Operator: Central Railway
- Lines: Howrah–Nagpur–Mumbai line Howrah–Prayagraj–Mumbai line Nagpur–Bhusawal section Bhusawal–Kalyan section Jabalpur–Bhusaval section
- Platforms: 9

Construction
- Structure type: At ground
- Parking: Available

Other information
- Status: Active
- Station code: BSL
- Division(s): Bhusawal

History
- Opened: 1860
- Electrified: 1968–69

Services
| Preceding station | Indian Railways | Following station |
|---|---|---|
| Varangaon towards ? | Central Railway zone Howrah–Nagpur–Mumbai line | Bhadli towards ? |
| Duskheda towards ? | Central Railway zone Howrah–Prayagraj–Mumbai line, New Delhi–Bhopal–Mumbai line | Bhadli towards ? |
Location
- Location within Maharashtra

Bhusawal Junction railway station (formerly Bhosawal) serves Bhusawal in Jalgaon district of the Indian state of Maharashtra. It is the biggest junction in Maharashtra. Bhusawal Railway station is one of the top 100 booking stations of Indian Railways, and its railway yard is the second biggest yard in Asia. There are total 243 tracks in the yard. Approximately fourteen trains originate at Bhusawal station, with 289 trains servicing the railway stop.

== History ==
Bhusawal railway station was formally established in 1863. In 1866, the Great Indian Peninsula Railway (GIPR) branch line was extended to Khandwa and then to Nagpur in 1867. Bhusawal is a divisional headquarters under Central Railways. Bhusawal railway station was built by the then British-run Indian government at a sum of £80,000 (8,00,000 Indian rupees) from 1852 to 1865. The station was built with a large bath, refreshment rooms, a large workshop, dwellings for European employees, reading rooms and gymkhana. The Bhusawal railway line was opened between 1861 and 1865.

== Electrification ==
Railways in the Bhusawal area were electrified in 1968–69. Like other lines, the railway is powered by a single-phase, 25 kV AC supply.

== Amenities ==
Amenities at Bhusawal railway station include an SBI ATM, reservation office, STD/PCO booth, waiting room, retiring room, vegetarian and non-vegetarian refreshments, information desk, post office, and Wi-Fi. The northern and southern entrances have separate ticketing windows. There is a free 4-wheeler parking area at the northern entrance. Bhusawal railway station and ST stand. Elevators and electric vehicles are available for use by railway station passengers.

== Locomotive shed ==
The locomotive shed at Bhusawal was established by GIPR in 1919. At that time, it was the largest in Asia and the third-largest in the world. The Electric Locomotive Workshop at Bhusawal was established in 1974 at a cost of ₹3.52 crores and performs periodical overhauls of electric locomotives. It is also the only workshop in India to perform overhauls of three-phase, induction motor-based trains.

Bhusawal Locomotive Shed has been accredited with the International Standard Certificate ISO 9008-2000 since April 2006.

The shed has WAM-4, WAP- 4, WAG-5, and WAG-9 locomotives.

== Gallery ==
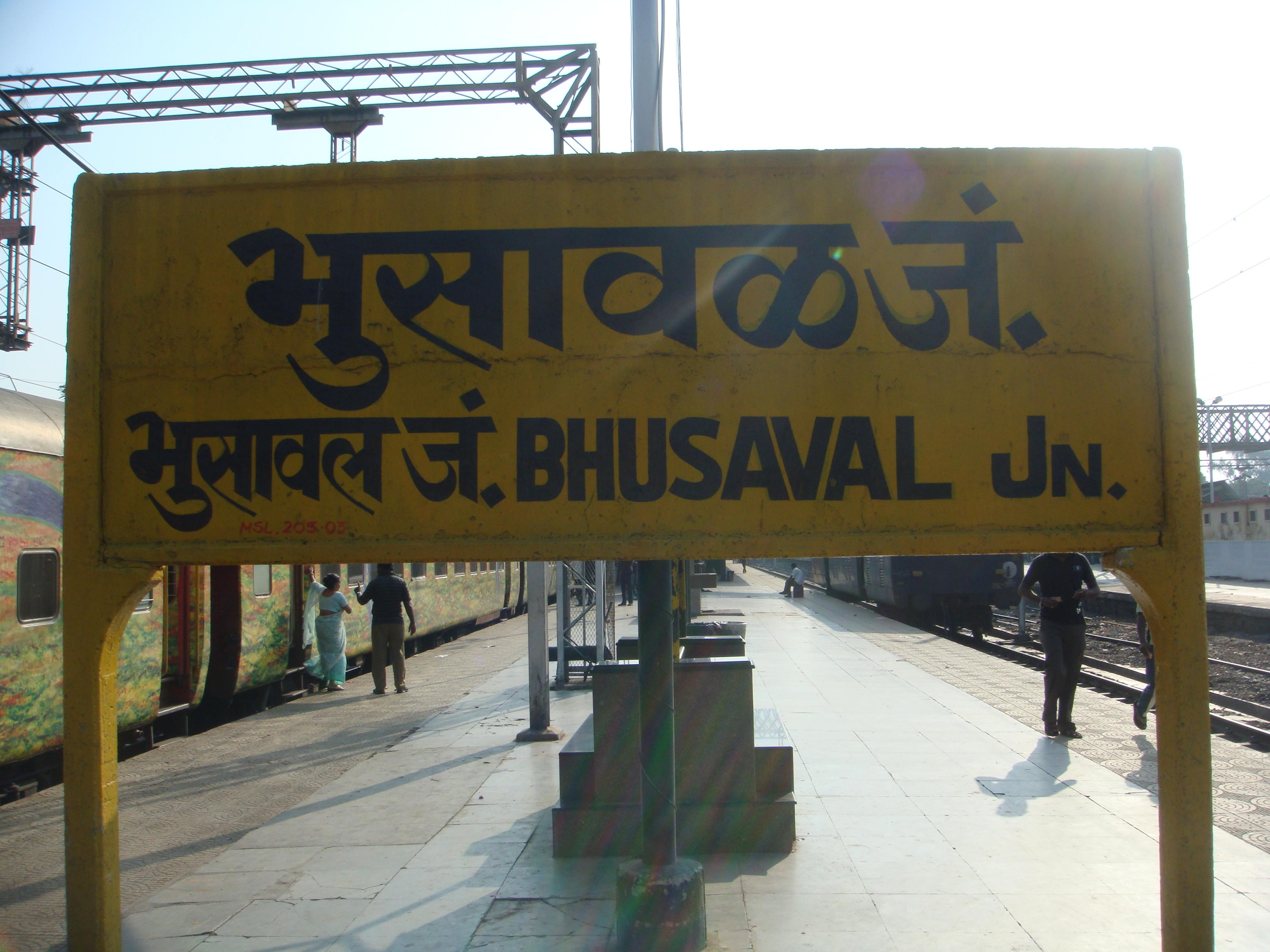
Bhusaval Junction
