= Saatvik Green Energy =

Indian renewable energy company

- Type: Public
- Traded as: NSE: SAATVIKGL; BSE: 544526
- ISIN: INE13B501022
- Industry: Renewable energy
- Founded: 2015; 11 years ago in Gurgaon, Haryana, India
- Headquarters: Gurgaon, Haryana, India
- Area served: Worldwide
- Key people: Neelesh Garg (Chairman & MD); Manik Garg (MD); Prashant Mathur (CEO)
- Products: [Solar modules|Solar Modules]], Solar Pumps, Inverters, Battery Energy Storage Systems, Solar Kits Transformers
- Production output: 4.8 GW (2026)
- Services: Project engineering, procurement and construction (EPC), operation and maintenance (O&M)
- Revenue: ▲₹4,548.4 crore (2025–26)
- Net income: ▲₹357.1 crore ₹217.1 crore (2025–26)
- Subsidiaries: Saatvik Solar Industries; Saatvik EPC; Saatvik Cleantech
- Website: saatvikgroup.com

Saatvik Green Energy is an Indian renewable energy company, headquartered in Gurgaon, Haryana, India. Founded in 2015, the company is primarily engaged in manufacturing solar photovoltaic (PV) modules and providing engineering, procurement, and construction (EPC) services for solar power plants. As of 2026, it operates 4.8 GW module manufacturing facilities in Ambala, Haryana.

The company operates wholly-owned subsidiaries, Saatvik Solar, which manufactures solar equipment, and Saatvik EPC, which manages the engineering, procurement, and construction business. In 2026, the company expanded its manufacturing operations through the commissioning of a 2 GW encapsulant manufacturing facility in Ambala and expanded into transformer manufacturing through the acquisition of an 80% stake in Melcon Transformers and Electricals.

== History ==
Founded in 2015, the company began its operations in 2016 with an installed capacity of 125 MW. It received a 141.76 MW solar module order from BHEL in 2021 for the Raghanesda Ultra Mega Solar Park project in Gujarat. In 2022, Saatvik Green Energy supplied 62 MW of solar modules for the 100 MW floating solar project at NTPC's Ramagundam Thermal Power Plant in Telangana.

In April 2023, the company established a subsidiary in Texas to sell its solar PV modules in the American market. Between the fiscal year 2023-24 and February 2025, the company expanded its production capacity from 564 MW to 3.7 GW.

In February 2024, it commissioned a 12 MW rooftop solar project at Jindal Steel and Power's facility in Angul, Odisha, which has been reported as Asia's largest single-rooftop plant. In September 2024, Saatvik Solar delivered 70.2 MW of solar modules to Satluj Jal Vidyut Nigam for its renewable energy project in Punjab. In October 2024, the company secured a ₹302 crore contract from Maharashtra State Power Generation Company to supply 200 MW of its N-TOPCon 580 Wp modules. Later that month, Saatvik Solar received another order to supply 213 MW of its 545 Wp Mono PERC Bifacial Modules to Larsen & Toubro for a battery energy storage system (BESS) project in Bihar.

In November 2024, Saatvik Green Energy partnered with Maharashtra State Electricity Distribution Company Limited to supply solar-powered submersible pumps across 250 sites in Maharashtra to enhance water access for irrigation and other purposes.

In January 2025, Saatvik Green Energy was awarded two solar Engineering, Procurement, and Construction (EPC) contracts by Himachal Pradesh Power Corporation Limited (HPPCL) for a combined capacity of 23 MW. The projects comprised an 11 MW solar plant at Lamlehri, using mono-PERC technology, and a 12 MW plant at Gondpur Bulla, using N-TOPCon technology. The Lamlehri project generates an estimated 17.13 million units of green energy annually, while the Gondpur plant produces about 19.13 million units per year.

Also in January 2025, the company signed a supply agreement valued at more than ₹1,500 crore for 1 GW of N-TOPCon solar PV modules with a domestic energy producer. In August 2025, Saatvik Solar was added to the Ministry of New and Renewable Energy's Approved List of Models and Manufacturers (ALMM) with a listed capacity of 1,941 MW. In October 2025, the company secured solar module orders worth ₹488 crore, while its subsidiary, Saatvik Solar Industries, received a separate order of ₹219.6 crore.

The company inducted cricketer Ravindra Jadeja as its brand ambassador in 2023 and actor Kartik Aaryan in 2025.

Under the PM-Kusum Scheme, the company was awarded a project by Maharashtra State Electricity Distribution Company Limited in September 2025 to install 1,500 solar water pumps across various districts in Maharashtra.

In March 2026, Saatvik Solar Industries received an order worth ₹638.26 crore to supply G12R TOPCon solar cells, with execution scheduled by March 2027.

In April 2026, Saatvik Green Energy acquired an 80% stake in Melcon Transformers and Electricals, expanding into the transformer manufacturing sector.

In August 2026, Saatvik Solar Industries signed a memorandum of understanding with the Industrial Promotion and Investment Corporation of Odisha (IPICOL) to establish an additional 3.6 GW solar cell manufacturing facility at Gopalpur in Ganjam district, Odisha. In September 2026, the company ₹1,041.63 crore order from SECI for solar PV module.

== Operations ==
The company's operations are centered around its manufacturing facilities in Ambala, Haryana, with a module manufacturing capacity of 4.8 GW. The company also operates a 2 GW in-house EPE encapsulant manufacturing facility at its Ambala campus. An integrated manufacturing facility is under development in the Ganjam district of Odisha. Phase I comprises 2.4 GW of solar cell and 4 GW of module manufacturing capacity, while a further 3.6 GW of solar cell manufacturing capacity is planned under Phase II. Its solar EPC division has an installed capacity of 69.12 MW.

Saatvik Green Energy manufactures solar photovoltaic modules using both mono-PERC and N-TOPCon technologies. The company's product range includes modules with power ratings of up to 580 Wp. Its modules incorporate designs such as half-cut cells and multi-busbar configurations, which are used to improve module efficiency and reduce energy losses. The company also offers UDAY Series on-grid inverters, hybrid and off-grid inverters, battery energy storage systems, and solar kits.

The company supplies solar modules for utility, commercial, and residential projects, and also undertakes engineering, procurement, and construction (EPC) contracts. It has supplied solar PV modules for various large-scale projects, including the Government of India's PM-KUSUM Yojana. Its notable clients include Maharashtra State Power Generation Company, Bharat Heavy Electricals Limited, and Avaada.

In June 2024, the company was recognized as a "Top Performer" in the PV Module Reliability Scorecard by Kiwa PVEL for its high-efficiency mono-bifacial half-cut PV modules.

Some of its notable projects include supplying solar modules for the 61.42 MW floating solar power project at Ramagundam, Telangana; the 72.15 MW Raghanseda Solar Park in the Banaskantha district, Gujarat; and the 70.2 MW project for SJVN Green Energy in Punjab.

== Financials ==
During the financial year 2025–26, Saatvik Green Energy reported a revenue of ₹4,548.4 crore, an EBITDA of ₹581.1 crore, and a net profit of ₹357.1 crore. In the previous financial year 2024–25, the company recorded a revenue of ₹2,158.4 crore and a net profit of ₹217.1 crore. The company had filed a draft prospectus with SEBI in November 2024 for an initial public offering (IPO).

It got listed on 26 September 2025 on both the Bombay Stock Exchange (BSE) and the National Stock Exchange of India (NSE). The shares opened at ₹460 on the BSE, slightly below the issue price of ₹465, and listed flat on the NSE. The company's ₹900 crore initial public offering, comprising a fresh issue of ₹700 crore and an offer for sale of ₹200 crore, was subscribed 6.57 times during the issue period from 19 to 23 September 2025.

Prior to the IPO, in September 2025, it raised ₹269.4 crore from anchor investors, including HDFC Mutual Fund, Nippon Life India, Bandhan Mutual Fund, SBI General Insurance, and 360 ONE.

== Awards and recognition ==
In 2024, Saatvik Green Energy was named a Top Performer in the PV Module Reliability Scorecard published by Kiwa PVEL for its mono-bifacial half-cut solar modules. In 2026, the company received the Outstanding Sustainability Performance award at the 4th Prithvi Awards.

== See also ==
- Solar power in India
- Renewable energy in India
- Solar power in India
- Solar Energy Corporation of India
