= Girish Sant =

Indian social worker

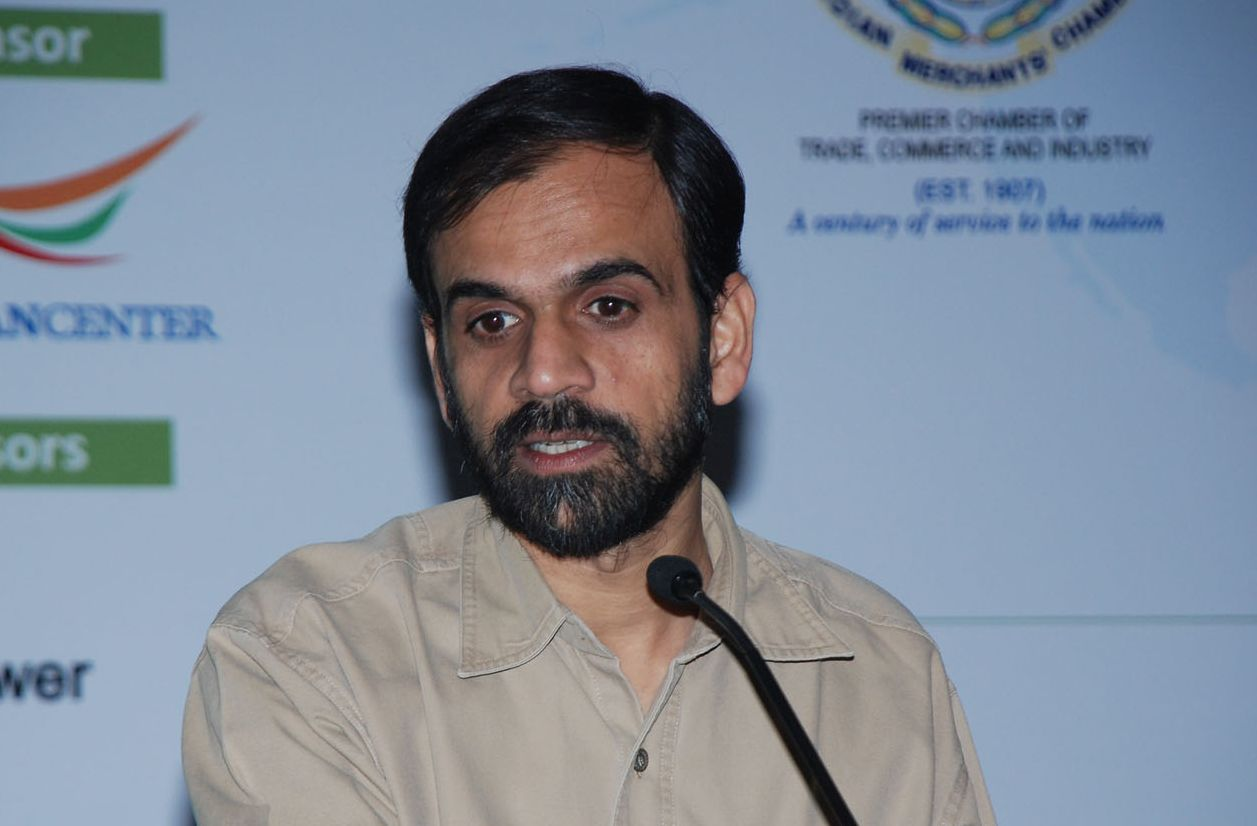
- Energy Analyst
- Born: 23 January 1966; Thane, Maharashtra, India
- Died: 2 February 2012 (aged 46); New Delhi, India
- Education: IIT Bombay
- Occupations: Founder and coordinator, Prayas (Energy Group)

Girish Sant (1966–2012) was a noted Indian energy analyst held in high esteem as an energy policy commentator from India. He co-founded the non-governmental organisation Prayas in Pune, India. His analytical inputs helped shape India's energy policy over the decades of the 1990s and 2000s. He was considered an effective team builder and mentored several energy researchers and activists.

== Formative years ==
Girish spent his childhood in Thane, and joined IIT Bombay in 1982 for BTech in Chemical engineering. After completing BTech in 1986, he also completed Masters in Energy Systems in 1988 from IIT.

Girish's years in IIT Mumbai brought out his leadership, team building and mountaineering skills. He was an accomplished mountaineer and rock climber, and made important rock climbing ascents with fellow mountaineers including the first ever climb of the Konkan Kada. He was an active member of the IIT Mountaineering Club and also the Institute Mountaineering Secretary during 1985–86.

During his stay at IIT, particularly during his Masters study, Girish started thinking about full-time work in a field of direct social relevance along with friends – Ajit Gaunekar and Aniruddha Ketkar. He started interacting with Subodh Wagle, then research fellow at Center for Technology Alternatives for Rural Areas, with whom he explored appropriate technologies, rural society and related developmental paradigms.

== Entry to the energy sector ==
By 1988, when Girish completed Masters in energy systems, he developed a clear idea that he wanted to work for the betterment of society and not for personal prosperity, using his professional skills on issues related to energy. He relocated to Pune and initially worked as a lecturer in an engineering college, undertook sporadic energy audit and industrial consultancy projects and then worked at Systems Research Institute. This was a period of exploration along with other like-minded friends – Shripad Dharmadhikary, Sanjeevani and Vinay Kulkarni – that brought him closer to people's movements, particularly the NBA.

During this period he came across the Development Focused End Use Oriented (DEFENDUS) approach to power sector planning developed by Prof. Amulya Kumar N. Reddy. Subsequent interactions with Prof. Reddy shaped his thinking and work in the energy sector in the early period. By this time, Girish started working with Shantanu Dixit who continued to be his colleague for the rest of his life. Analytical motivation from DEFENDUS, along with the support of friends and a scholarship from Dr. Ashok Gadgil, led to his first major work on development of a least cost plan for Maharashtra. Development of the least cost plan, its dissemination to various quarters and subsequent responses from power sector actors and activists contributed to his understanding of the energy sector and the broader political economy and institutional dynamics of the sector in India.

This was also the time of reforms for the power sector in India, which witnessed entry of projects such as Dabhol Power Company built by Enron. Girish, Subodh and Shantanu were able to see the long term implications of such projects and reforms for the Indian power sector and economy at large. Realising the need to de-mystify such complex projects and to highlight their implications for people of the state and the country, they worked relentlessly to unravel the complex power purchase agreement of Enron and communicate the devastating impact of the project to activists and the wider community. These early experiences shaped his vision for the power sector as well as his strategic and substantive approach to work in the energy sector.

== Formation of prayas, institution building and approach to policy analysis ==
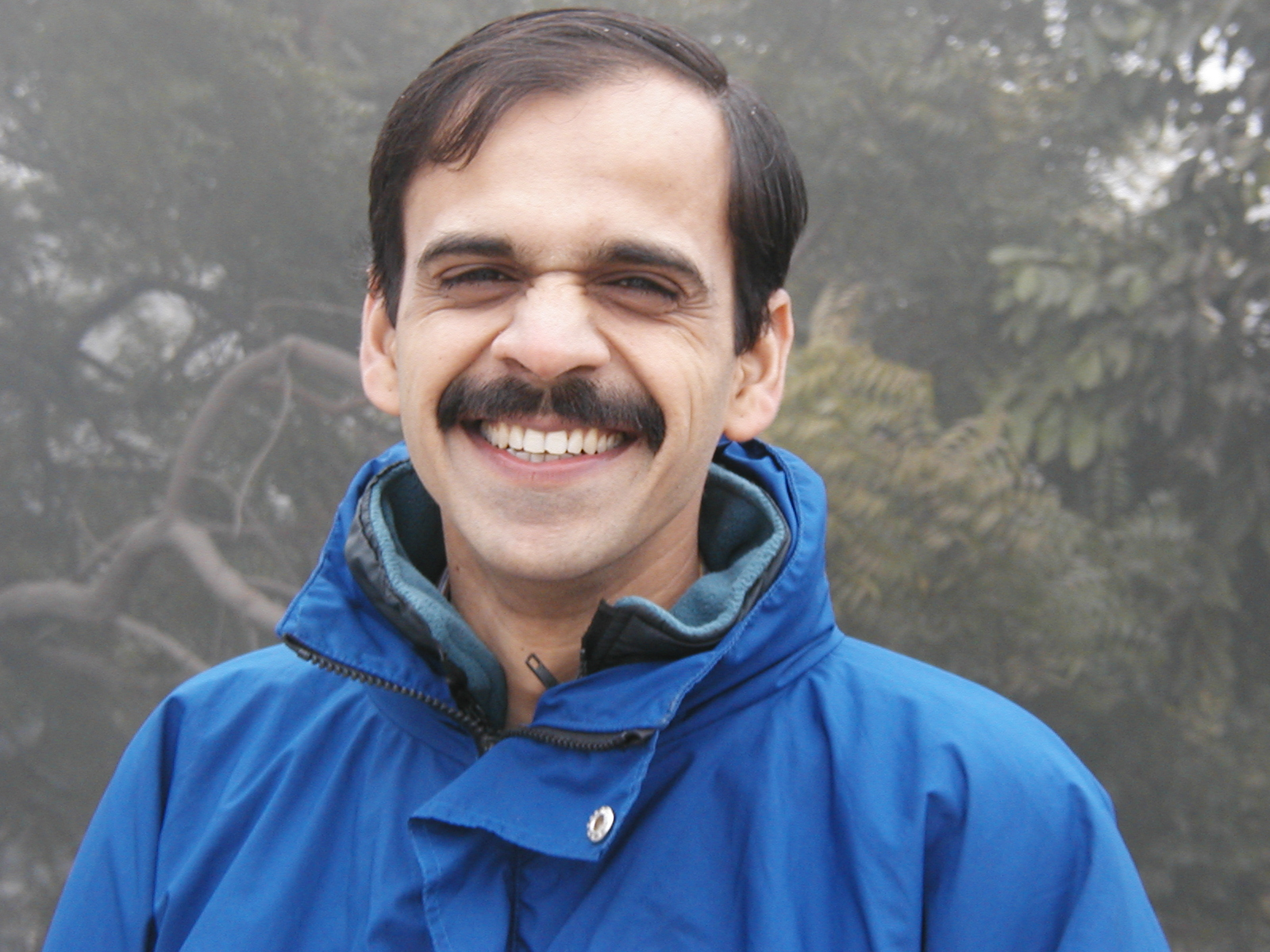
Girish Sant at New Rajendra Nagar in New Delhi, January 2002

In 1994, his work in the energy sector evolved into the formation of Prayas, Initiatives in Health, Energy, Learning and Parenthood along with Sanjeevani and Vinay Kulkarni.

Girish believed in and ensured teamwork and democratic working of the group. Under his leadership, the Energy Group within Prayas (PEG), which started with three people, expanded to a team of over 15 researchers from a variety of backgrounds. Girish had the ability to connect with a wide range of professionals, which attracted senior researchers as well as young engineers to join Prayas.

Girish was particular about encouraging intellectual and substantive growth of colleagues, and supported new initiatives in the form of Resources and Livelihoods group of Prayas as well as academic interests of young researchers. Girish paid meticulous attention to the internal processes within Prayas and ensured that proper procedures were followed. Many peers and friends of Girish consider his institution building abilities as important a contribution and achievement as his substantive work in the energy sector. Girish assisted the likes of Sucheta Dalal, then a columnist in the Times of India, in understanding the controversial Dabhol power project and the Enron India scam that they unearthed.

Girish emphasised the need to be agile and to undertake strategic interventions in the sector. High quality and in-depth analysis, comprehensive approach, and prioritising interests of disadvantaged sections became the hallmark of his work and he successfully cultivated these principles across PEG. He believed that improving governance in infrastructure sectors like energy has the dual advantage of improving lives of the poor as well as saving public money that can then be spent on other services such as education. He successfully motivated and actively supported many young researchers to take up the task of policy advocacy in the energy sector based on public interest analysis.

In spite of several accomplishments and achieving an important stature in the energy sector in India, Girish remained humble and self-effacing, as is reflected in many of the tributes on his memorial webpage and in the Smriti Grantha (or Collection of Memoirs). He was mild mannered and soft-spoken, even when trying to convince someone holding a contrary opinion. This quality endeared him to many in the sector resulting in increased impact.

== Interventions in the electricity sector ==
Girish was known in the energy sector for his use of high quality analysis to expose inadequacies of conventional planning and projects that result out of such a process. Under his guidance, PEG undertook techno-economic analysis of three large hydro-electric projects, Sardar Sarovar and Maheshwar in India and Bujagali in Uganda. The group analysed Sardar Sarovar and Maheshwar projects and highlighted inefficiencies therein, proposing several techno-economically feasible and socially desirable alternatives. Analysis of Bujagali Hydroelectric Power Station brought out inflated capital costs and one-sided nature of the power purchase agreement and led to renegotiation of the contract.

The wave of independent power producers in the 1990s was followed by State Electricity Board (SEB) reforms supported by the World Bank and Asian Development Bank, starting from Orissa in 1996. Under these reforms unbundling the SEB into generation, transmission and distribution companies, setting up a regulatory commission and gradually privatising the distribution was presented as the solution to all problems in power sector. PEG was the first to prepare a public interest critique of the Orissa model of reforms in 1998 and the role of Multi-lateral Development Banks, arguing that democratising governance is the key to addressing the power sector crisis, rather than focusing only on infusing capital or changing ownership.

PEG realised that the fight against unjust, inefficient projects needs to be started at the macro-level planning stage itself. Experience of disseminating least cost plan and struggle against Enron project, highlighted the influence of political economy on decision making and underscored the need for improving governance through enhanced transparency, accountability and participation (TAP) in the energy sector decision making. These insights have since guided the group's work in the energy sector and led to the group undertaking early interventions in improving the newly emerging independent regulatory commissions. Girish provided strategic guidance on the initial idea of bringing together a transnational network of civil society groups, called the Electricity Governance Initiative, that would work together to advance the principles of transparent, inclusive and accountable governance of electricity.

Girish was keen that analysis is followed by actual interventions aimed at pro-people changes. Accordingly, PEG actively engaged with several state as well as central regulatory commissions, with the aim of making regulatory process more transparent, accountable, participatory and helped serve the public interest more effectively. Subsequent to enactment of Electricity Act 2003, PEG was actively involved in giving inputs to national policies such as National Electricity Policy, Tariff Policy and Competitive Bidding Guidelines. This analysis of the Indian power sector and its role in the regulatory process was acknowledged by many in the sector.

== Work beyond the electricity sector ==
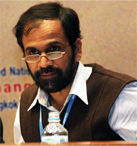
Girish Sant at a UN Climate Change Workshop, 2011

Since 2006, Girish focused more on macro issues of resource availability, utilisation, and growing importance of global climate debate on India's energy policy. In 2009, he co-authored a report, 'An Overview of India's Energy Trends', highlighting important differences in energy production and consumption trends of India, US, European Union and China. Based on this work, he was invited to make presentations at high level meetings at COP15 at Copenhagen and at The Center for Clean Air Policy, Washington, D.C. He was India's representative at a UN workshop on non-Annex 1 NAMAs.

Subsequently, he was one of India's representatives in the BASIC Expert Group (an informal energy expert group formed by BASIC governments) that worked towards developing greater understanding of energy use in BASIC countries and for evolving common approach to climate negotiation. All these efforts and analysis contributed to strengthening India's position in the global discourse on climate change and energy, and also helped shape the domestic policy discourse.

On the domestic front, while welcoming the investment in renewable energy (RE), Girish suggested measures to improve effectiveness and equity in RE expansion. He was instrumental in making a case for setting up a National Wind Energy Mission, which is scheduled to begin in 2014.

Search for innovative solutions to vexed problems was another characteristic of Girish. This search led to a unique and novel concept for improving efficiency of commonly used domestic appliances. Though Girish and several other researchers had pointed out that energy efficiency of commonly used domestic appliances is very poor and using most efficient appliances instead of these inefficient appliances will lead to savings of thousands of MWs, a workable large scale solution to achieve this transformation was elusive. Girish, along with colleagues at Prayas, developed a concept called 'Super-Efficient Equipment Program – SEEP' under which nominal incentives are provided to appliance manufacturers to bring super-efficient equipment into the market. He successfully convinced Government of India and Planning Commission officials of the benefits of implementing such a program. Under this program, which will be launched in 2014 as part of the 12th Five Year Plan, it is expected that over five million 'super-efficient' fans, which consume half the electricity of normal fans, will be sold in the market. This approach is also being adopted at the global level under the auspices of the Clean Energy Ministerial.

Girish was also part of several official committees, such as Planning Commission's working groups for 11th and 12th five-year plans, Planning Commission's Steering Committee on Energy, the Supreme Court appointed Committee on Solid Waste Disposal, and Planning Commission's Expert Group on Low Carbon Strategies for Inclusive Growth.

== Death ==
Girish died on 2 February 2012 in New Delhi due to cardiac arrest.

A committee consisting of people from within and outside Prayas was formed to manage activities organised in Girish's memory and "to further his work of independent analysis and advocacy to promote public interest issues in the energy sector". These activities include an annual memorial lecture organised in Pune and a fellowship for young researchers pursuing public interest research and advocacy.

== Membership in policy related committees ==
1. Member, BASIC Expert Group (2011–12)
2. Convener Transport Working Group, of The Expert Group appointed by The Planning Commission (India) in 2010, to work out the 'Low Carbon Strategy for Inclusive Growth'
3. Member, World Bank Expert Committee to review West Bengal Power Sector Reforms (2008)
4. Member, 'Working Group on Power' for formulation of XIth five-year plan for the National Planning Commission (India) (2006–07)
5. Member, Expert Group, convened by Secretary of Power (Government of India) to seek "radical" policy suggestions (2006)
6. Member Expert Group on "Financing access to basic utilities for all" formed by the Friedrich Ebert Foundation in co-operation with the Financing for Development Office, June 2006.
7. Member, Expert Committee appointed by The Supreme Court of India for evaluating 'Waste to Energy projects from Municipal Solid Waste', appointed through Ministry of Non-Conventional Energy Sources (2005–06)
8. Member, Central Advisory Committee of Central Electricity Regulatory Commission (India), since 1998 till 2010
9. Member, State Advisory Committee of Maharashtra Electricity Regulatory Commission, since 1999 till 2010
10. Member, 'Consultative Group on Power & Energy' of Planning Commission (India) for review of energy sector performance in the Xth plan
11. Member, Advisory Committee, ADB Policy Research Network to strengthen policy reforms – Infrastructure Development for Poverty Reduction: Priorities, Constraints and Strategies (2004–05)
12. Member, Western Regional Energy Committee Confederation of Indian Industries (CII) (2003 and 2004)
13. Member Advisory Committee, Distribution Reforms Upgrade Management (DRUM) program of Government of India and USAID (2003)
14. Member, Study Group on Benefits of Sardar Sarovar Dam Project, Government of Maharashtra (2001)
15. Member, Task Force to review Narmada Dams, Government of M.P. (1998)
16. Member, International team of civil society to review status of rehabilitation of project affected persons at by Coal mines and Thermal plants at Singrauli (UP) (1995)

== Recognition ==
1. Dr. T. N. Khoshoo Memorial Award in 'Conservation, Environment and Development' for year 2010, – Ashoka Trust for Research in Ecology and the Environment (Bangalore)
2. 'Best Energy Alumni' – Energy Department, IIT Bombay (2008).
3. 'Life Time Achievement – Encouragement Award' – Workers' and Engineers' union of Power utility in Maharashtra (2003), which he accepted on behalf of Prayas (energy group)
4. As a student, received citation for 'Exceptional Contribution Award' for enhancing Mountaineering activity at IIT Bombay.
5. 'Annual Girish Sant Memorial Lecture' – IIT Bombay
6. Dedication of the book "Churning the Earth"
