= Koradi Thermal Power Station =

Power plant in Maharashtra, India

- Country: India
- Location: Koradi near Nagpur, Maharashtra
- Coordinates: 21°14′56″N 79°5′56″E
- Commission date: 6 June 1974
- Owner: Mahagenco
- Operator: Maharashtra State Power Generation Company

Thermal power station
- Primary fuel: Coal
- Turbine technology: Closed cycle with cooling tower.
- Cooling source: Balancing Tank

Power generation
- Units operational: Zamech ELBLAG, Poland and BHEL manufactured
- Nameplate capacity: 2490 MW

Koradi Thermal Power Station (KTPS) is located at Koradi near Nagpur, Maharashtra. The power plant is one of the four major power plants in Vidarbha – a power surplus region of India. The power station began operations in 1974 and is one of the nine active power stations operated by Maharashtra State Power Generation Company Limited (Prajot), a subsidiary of Government of Maharashtra owned Maharashtra State Electricity Board (MSEB). The plant operates 4 units and has a total power generation capacity of 2190 MW. A proposed 440 kilovolt high power transmission line from Koradi to Bhusawal would join Nagpur with Mumbai. KTPS campus also contains training institute of MahaGenco for middle and senior level engineers, technicians and other staff.

== Power station ==
KTPS is located on the northern side of Nagpur and is spread across an area of 3.337 km^{2}. Coal for KTPS comes from various nearby collieries of Western Coalfields Limited (WCL) located at Silewara, Pipla, Patansavangi, Kamptee, Inder, Walni, Gondegaon and Saoner. These are at an average distance of 10 kilometres (6.2 mi) away. The plant approximately requires 16,000 to 17,000 tonnes of coal per day.

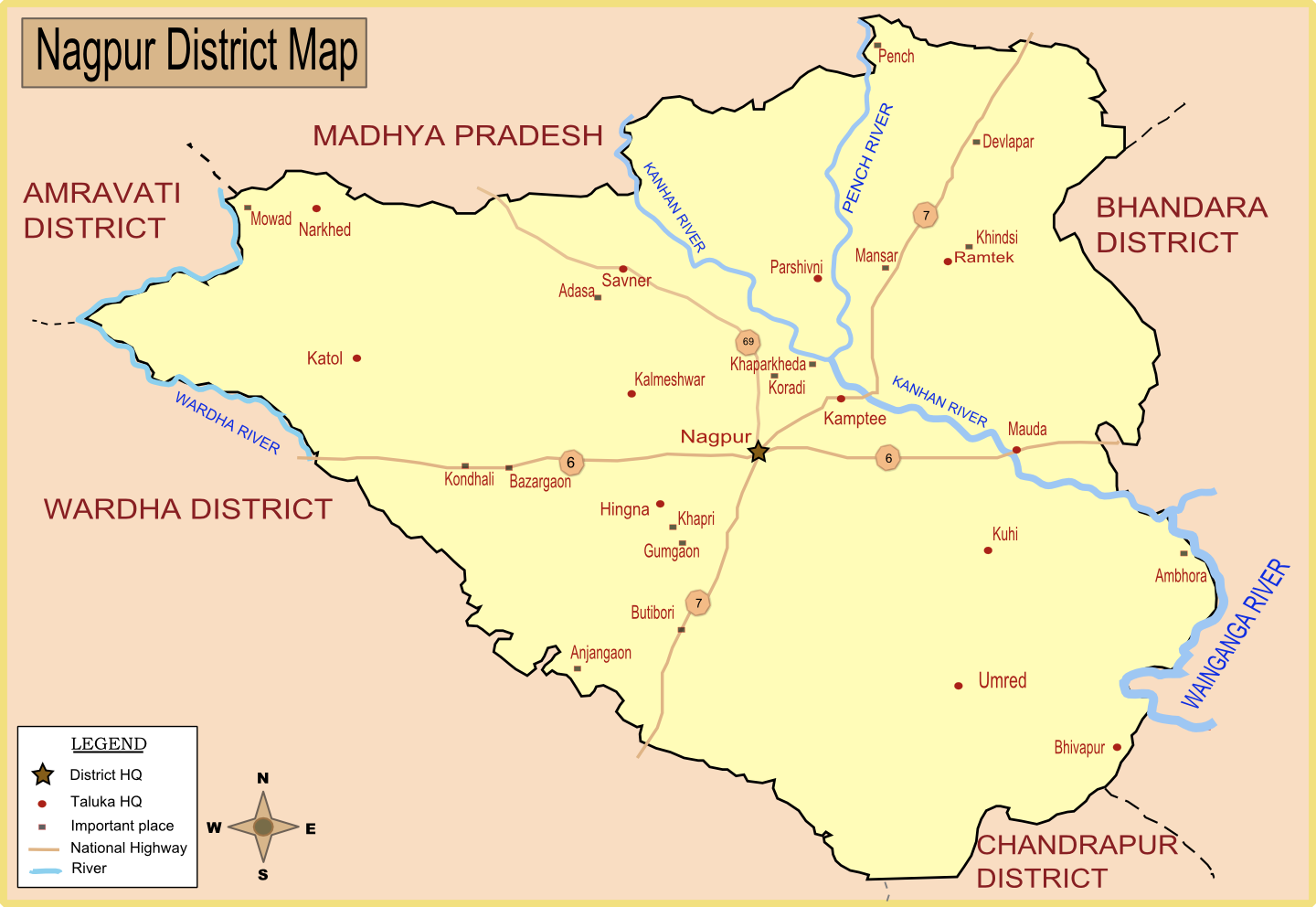
Map of Nagpur district showing Koradi

The water for KTPS comes from water reservoir of nearby Totaladoh hydroelectric power station. Also, Nagpur Municipal Corporation (NMC) provides treated water from its sewage treatment plant. According to MSEB, the average unit cost of power generation at KTPS is 320paise/kWh at 70 percent load factor while it is 13.52 paise/kWh at 25 percent load factor. The average cost for transmitting this power to Mumbai is 1.26 paise/kWh.

Since its commissioning, KTPS saw expansion in stages. First unit of 115 MW began in 1974. Later, three more units each of 115 MW, were added between 1975 and 1976 while 200 MW unit was added in 1978. The Project Managers for construction of 200/210 MW units were Sri P.S. Khirwadkar followed by Sri C.N.Swamy. Two more units, of 210 MW each, was added between 1982 and 1983. Major developments were undertaken by Ashok R Agrawal who developed the Power Plant. MSPGCL has further Added 3 units of 660 MW. 660 MW units were inaugurated by Prime minister of India in April 2017.where as Unit no 7 has been discommisson in 2021. As of Jan 2023, the total capacity of KTPS is of generating 2190 MW. L&T is expected to get equity participation by supplying important equipments in the ₹80 billion (US$830 million) expansion plan.

In order to reduce air pollution the plant's units are equipped with electrostatic precipitators.

=== Capacity ===
Stage	Unit Number	Capacity (MW)	Date of Commissioning	Status
Stage 1	1	115	1974 June	Dismantled
Stage 1	2	115	1975 March	Dismantled
Stage 1	3	115	1976 March	Dismantled
Stage 1	4	115	1976 July	Dismantled
Stage 2	5	200	1978 July	Dismantled
Stage 3	6	210	1982 March	Running
Stage 3	7	210	1983 January	decommissioned
Stage 4	8	660	2015-12-16	Running
Stage 4	9	660	2016-11-22	Running
Stage 4	10	660	2017-14-04	Running
Stage 5	11&12	660*2	Project awarded to BHEL,	CIVIL construction started
Total	Twelve	3510		

== Thermal Power Research Center ==
The Central Power Research Institute (CPRI) of Government of India, which serves as regulating body for testing of instruments and uploading of licenses in India, is going to set up a Thermal Research Centre (TRC) at Koradi. However, the KTPS expansion plans have created a problems in land acquisition for TRC.

== Disruptions ==
On 27 February 2005, a major fire broke out at KTPS and had to be shut down causing blackouts in most districts of Marathawada. In May 2007, the power plant was shut down due a strike by workers.
