= Prayas (Energy Group) =

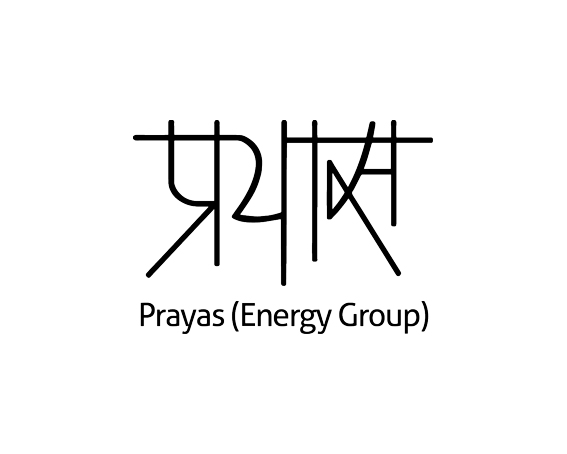
- Founder: Girish Sant
- Type: Non-governmental organization
- Location: Pune, India
- Website: www.prayaspune.org/peg

Prayas (Energy Group) is an Indian research and analysis organisation working in the area of energy policy. It is part of a non-governmental charitable trust called Prayas (long name is Initiatives in Health, Energy and Parenthood) located in Pune, India. The aim of Prayas is to make energy a tool for sustainable and equitable development for all citizens, by analysis, discourse building, policy and regulatory engagements and collaboration with other civil society organisations.

== History ==
Prayas was founded in 1994 by three professionals - two doctors and an engineer – with the aim of using professional skills to promote public interest, including that of disadvantaged sections of the society and of the environment. Prayas has four groups working on different sectors - health, energy, resources & livelihoods, and learning & parenthood.

Girish Sant, an energy systems engineer, was the founder coordinator of Prayas. After he died in 2012, Shantanu Dixit became the group coordinator. Prayas’s first activities were in the area of renewable energy and energy efficiency. It later took up studies on the socioeconomic impacts of projects such as Dabhol Power Station promoted by Enron. With the advent of reforms in the Indian electricity sector, Prayas published reports on electricity and related energy sectors.

== Areas of work ==
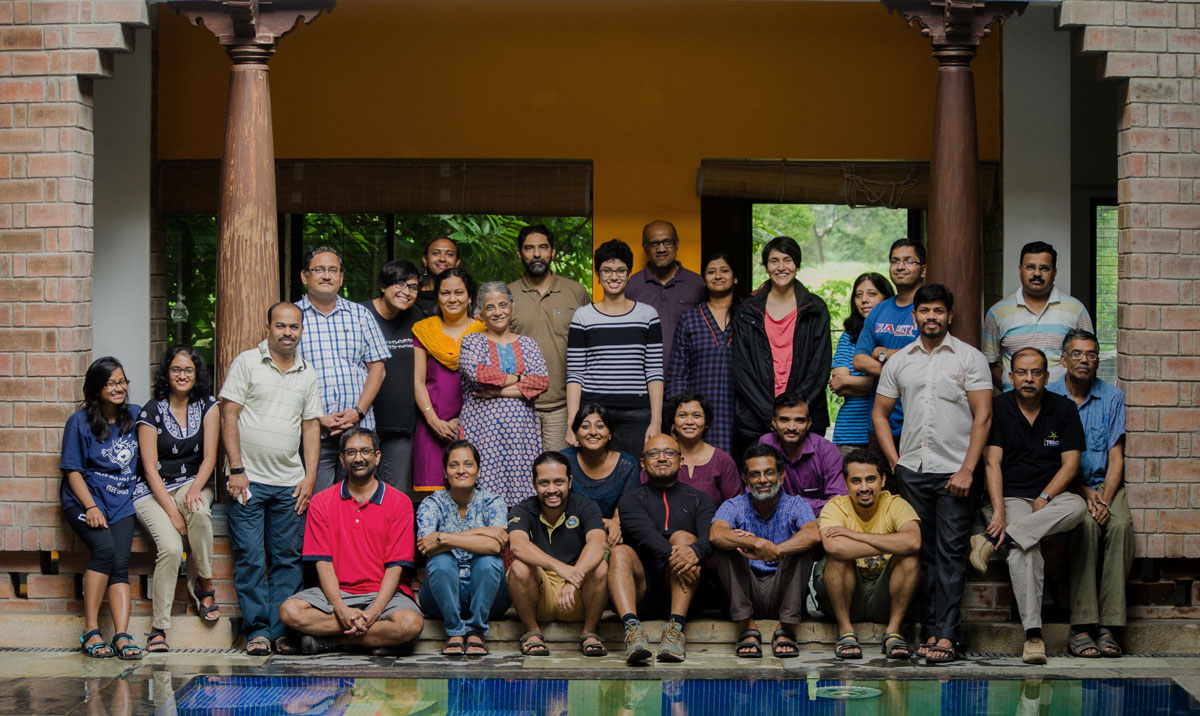
The PEG team, 2017

Prayas works on governance, regulation and policy related aspects of electricity and energy sectors. There are four major areas of work, namely: Electricity generation & supply, Energy efficiency, Renewable energy and Energy, resources & development. It covers many Indian states and national issues. There are also a few international initiatives, undertaken with collaboration with other organisations. These include analysis of Bujagali hydro power project in Uganda, Electricity Governance Initiative and Electricity Supply Monitoring Initiative.

== Outputs ==
Work outputs of Prayas include reports, guides and regulatory or policy submissions, all of which are available on its website. Some major outputs are, Analysis of Enron-Dabhol power project, Survey of Electricity Regulatory Commissions, Primer on Electricity, Solar Roof-Top Photovoltaics (PV) in India, Activist Guide for better electricity service, Challenges before the Indian Coal Sector and Energy Requirement for decent living. Prayas's outputs include newspaper articles on topics like Solar Options for Agriculture, Energy Efficiency and Clean Cooking Challenges. There are also presentations/interviews on topics like India energy challenges, Energy policy, and Indian energy sector trends.

Prayas is a member of several official committees at the Central and State levels and has been knowledge partner to Central Government institutions such as NITI Aayog. Various commentators and reviewers have noted that the work of Prayas has contributed to improving governance and policy in the energy sector.
