= Khaparkheda Thermal Power Station =

Coal-fired power station in Maharashtra, India

- Country: India
- Location: Nagpur, Maharashtra (state)
- Coordinates: 21.276138°N 79.121518°E
- Status: Operational
- Operator: Mahagenco

Thermal power station
- Primary fuel: Coal

Power generation
- Nameplate capacity: 1,340 MW

External links
- Website: Source: mahagenco.in

Khaparkheda Thermal Power Station is located in Khaperkheda Town Nagpur district in the Indian state of Maharashtra. The power plant is one of the oldest coal based power plants of Maharashtra State Power Generation Company. The coal for the power plant is sourced from Saoner and Dumri Khurd mines of Western Coalfields Limited (WCL).Mainly coal transport through the Indian Railways. Now coal India has opened many mines in nearby areas and these mines are also providing coal to the power plant, specially to the new power plant which is of 500 MW. Source of water for the power plant is from Pench reservoir through a pond of Koradi Thermal Power Station (KTPS). Since the new power plant has begun operations, locals have reported increase in dust leading to many health conditions. This is due to low quality equipment used in the power plant

== Capacity ==
| Stage | Unit number | Installed capacity | Date of commissioning |
|---|---|---|---|
| 1st | 1 | 210 MW | March 1989 |
| 1st | 2 | 210 MW | January 1990 |
| 1st | 3 | 210 MW | April 2000 |
| 1st | 4 | 210 MW | January 2001 |
| 1st | 5 | 500 MW | August 2011 |
| Total | Five | 1340 MW | |
