= Bhusawal–Kalyan section =

Railway line in India

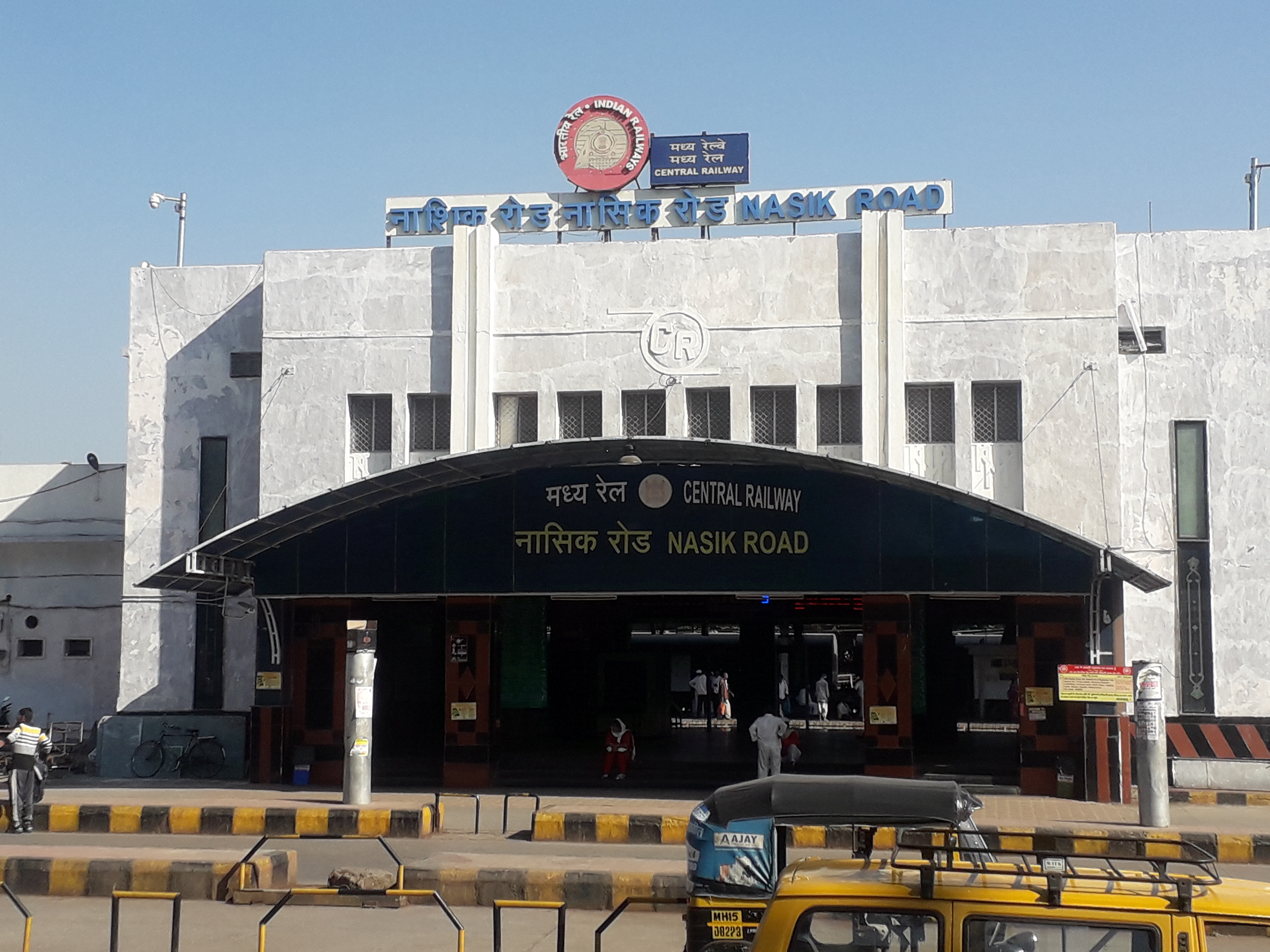
- Nasik Road an important railway station on Bhusawal–Kalyan section

Overview
- Native name: भुसावळ-कल्याण विभाग
- Status: Operational
- Owner: Indian Railways
- Locale: Maharashtra, Gujarat
- Termini: Bhusawal; Kalyan

Service
- System: Electrified
- Services: Howrah–Nagpur–Mumbai line Howrah–Prayagraj–Mumbai line New Delhi–Bhopal–Mumbai line
- Operator(s): Central Railway, Western Railway for a part of a branch line
- Depot(s): Bhusawal, Kalyan, Manmad, Igatpuri
- Rolling stock: WAM-4, WAP- 4, WAG-5, WAG-7, WCM-6, WCG-2, WCAM-3, WCAG-1 electric locomotives

History
- Opened: Around 1865

Technical
- Track length: Main line: 390 km (242 mi); Branch lines Manmad–Daund 238 km (148 mi); Pachora–Jamner 56 km (35 mi); Chalisgaon–Dhule 56 km (35 mi); Jalgaon–Surat 313 km (194 mi)
- Number of tracks: Main line: 2
- Track gauge: 5 ft 6 in (1,676 mm) broad gauge
- Electrification: 1.5 kV DC overhead system in 1929 for Kalyan–Igatpuri sector, Igatpuri–Bhusawal with 25 kV AC overhead system in 1967–69. DC system has been converted to AC system
- Operating speed: Main line: up to 130 km/h

The Bhusawal–Kalyan section is part of the Howrah–Nagpur–Mumbai line and Howrah–Prayagraj–Mumbai line. It connects Bhusawal and Kalyan both in the Indian state of Maharashtra. One of the branch lines, Jalgaon–Surat line, runs partly in Gujarat.

== Geography ==
Part of some of the major trunk lines in the country, this line passes through a section of the Deccan Plateau, starting with Khandesh, It crosses the Western Ghats across the Thul Ghat and enters the Western Coastal Plains.

=== Thul Ghat ===
Thul Ghat (incline) is a series of mountain slopes in the Western Ghats traversed by this line. From Kalyan to Kasara, the line covers a length of 42 mi (68 km) and rises to an altitude of 948 ft (289 m) above sea level at Kasara. The next section from Kasara to Igatpuri is 9.5 mi (15 km) across Thul Ghat and within that distance the line rises from 289 ft (88 m) to 1,918 ft (585 m) the gradient in the section being 1:37. The line negotiates this steep incline with the help of curves. The Ehegaon viaduct along this line is 719 ft (219 m) long and 180 ft (55 m) high. According to IRFCA, "The viaduct is situated in a steep valley nestling in the midst of hills that skirt around it in the tunnels and then is carried across the yawning chasm on a tall imposing structure… Some of the viaducts and tunnels on this line are considered outstanding achievements in Civil Engineering and are among the finest works in the world."

== Economy ==
This line serves two coal-based thermal power stations: the 880 MW Nashik Thermal Power Station of Mahagenco and 850 MW Ukai Thermal Power Station of Gujarat State Electricity Corporation Limited. Nasik TPS consumed 4,626,000 tonnes of coal in 2006–07 and Ukai TPS consumed 3,200,000 tonnes the same year. Coal transportation forms 42 per cent of the total freight earnings of Indian railways.

== History ==
=== Main line ===
The first train in India traveled from Chhatrapati Shivaji Terminus railway station in Mumbai, then known as Boribunder, to Thane on 16 April 1853. Within about a year Great Indian Peninsula Railway connected the Mumbai–Thane line to Kalyan. Service up to Igatpuri (across the Thul Ghat) was started in 1865. Before that, Bhusawal station was set up in 1860 and most of the line between Bhusawal and Igatpuri was laid in 1861-62 but the line was activated in mid-1860s, after completion of the line across Thul Ghat.

=== Branch lines ===
The 1,676 mm (5 ft 6 in) Tapti Valley Railway linked Surat, on the Bombay, Baroda and Central India Railway, to the Great Indian Peninsula system at Amalner in the Khandesh region, in 1900. It was one of the railways set up by Killick Nixon Limited.

The 1,676 mm (5 ft 6 in) Manmad–Daund line was opened in 1878 and connects the two main sections (the south-east and north east) of GIPR. The line is being doubled.

The Hyderabad–Godavari Valley Railways opened the 1,000 mm (3 ft 3 3/8 in) metre gauge Manmad–Secunderabad line (not shown in the route chart) in 1900.

The 1,676 mm (5 ft 6 in) Chalisgaon–Dhule line was opened in 1900.

The Pachora–Jamner 2 ft 6 in (762 mm) narrow-gauge line was opened by Central Province Railway in 1919.

=== Shirdi ===
The 17.5 km (11 mi)-long 1,676 mm (5 ft 6 in)-wide broad-gauge Puntamba-Shirdi link, connecting Shirdi to the Manmad–Daund branch line was completed in 2009. The Manmad–Puntamba–Sainagar Shirdi line was electrified in 2011–12.

=== New lines ===
Indian Railways have cleared the construction of Manmad–Indore and Nashik–Pune new lines after sixteen years of active lobbying.

=== Railway reorganisation ===
The Great Indian Peninsula Railway was taken over by the state in 1925. In 1951, the Great Indian Peninsula Railway, the Nizam's Guaranteed State Railway, the Scindia State Railways and the Dholpur Railways were merged to form Central Railway. In the same year, the Bombay, Baroda and Central India Railway, the Saurashtra Railway, the Rajasthan Railway, the Jaipur Railway and the Cutch State Railway were merged to form Western Railway.

== Electrification and electric loco sheds ==
The Kalyan–Igatpuri section was electrified with 1.5 kV DC overhead system in 1929. Subsequent electrification with 25 kV AC overhead system in the Igatpuri–Manmad sector, with AC/DC change over at Igatpuri, was carried out in 1967–69. The Manmad–Bhusawal sector was electrified in 1968–69. The change over of mainlines in the Mumbai area from DC to AC traction was completed in June 2015.

There are large loco sheds at Bhusawal and Kalyan, and the smaller trip sheds at Manmad and Igatpuri. The loco shed at Bhusawal was established by the Great Indian Peninsula Railway in 1919. At that time it was the largest in Asia and third-largest in the world. WAM-4, WAP- 4, WAG-5, WAG-7, WCM-6, WCG-2, WCAM-3 and WCAG-1 electric locomotives find a place in these sheds. Kalyan also houses some diesel locomotives.

== Speed limits ==
The entire Howrah–Nagpur–Mumbai line is planned to be converted into a "Group A" line, which would enable it take speeds up to 160 km/h. The branch lines have speed limits within 100 km/h.

== Passenger movement ==
Bhusawal and Manmad on this line, are amongst the top hundred booking stations of Indian Railway.

The tourist train Deccan Odyssey passes through a part of the route.
