= Khadake =

Village in Maharashtra

Khadake Khadke (खडके)
- Village
- Location in Maharashtra, India
- Coordinates: 21°1′30.3″N 75°48′42.5″E
- Country: India
- State: Maharashtra
- District: Jalgaon
- Taluka: Bhusawal

Area
  - Total: 810 ha (2,000 acres)

Population (2011)
  - Total: 9,332
  - Density: 1,200/km^{2} (3,000/sq mi)
- Time zone: UTC+5:30 (IST)

Khadake (also spelled Khadke; Marathi: खडके) is a village in Bhusawal taluka of Jalgaon district, Maharashtra, India. It is located close to the city of Bhusawal. This article refers specifically to Khadake with Census village code 527105.

== Geography ==
Khadake covers an area of about 810 hectares and falls under the Bhusawal taluka administrative area. It lies in the Khandesh (Northern Maharashtra) region and is in close proximity to Bhusawal town.

== Demographics ==
As per the 2011 Census of India, Khadake had a population of 9,332 in around 1,907 households. The literacy rate was recorded at about 75.8%, with male literacy higher than female literacy.

== Administration ==
Khadake is governed by a Gram panchayat within Bhusawal taluka and is part of Jalgaon district administration.

== Economy ==
Agriculture is the primary occupation; residents also access employment and markets in nearby Bhusawal and Jalgaon.

== Transport ==
Khadake is located near Bhusawal and uses Bhusawal’s rail and road links for regional connectivity. The local postal (PIN) code for the area is 425307.

== Culture ==
Local customs follow the agrarian and Marathi traditions of the Khandesh region. The village has a majority of residents from the Leva Patil community.

== See also ==
- Bhusawal
- Jalgaon district
