= Sakegaon =

Village in Maharashtra, India

Coordinates: 21°02′31″N 75°44′18″E

Sakegaon is a village in Bhusawal taluka, Jalgaon district, Maharashtra, India.

According to the 2011 Indian Census, 9,195 people reside in 2,031 households in the village.
