= Ratnagiri Gas and Power =

Indian Renewal Energy Plant

Ratnagiri Gas and Power Private Limited
- Type: subsidiary of NTPC Limited
- Industry: Energy
- Predecessor: Enron
- Founded: 8 July 2005
- Headquarters: Anjanvel, Ratnagiri, Maharashtra, India
- Services: Power generation and LNG regasification
- Parent: NTPC Limited
- Website: www.rgppl.com

Ratnagiri Gas and Power Private Limited
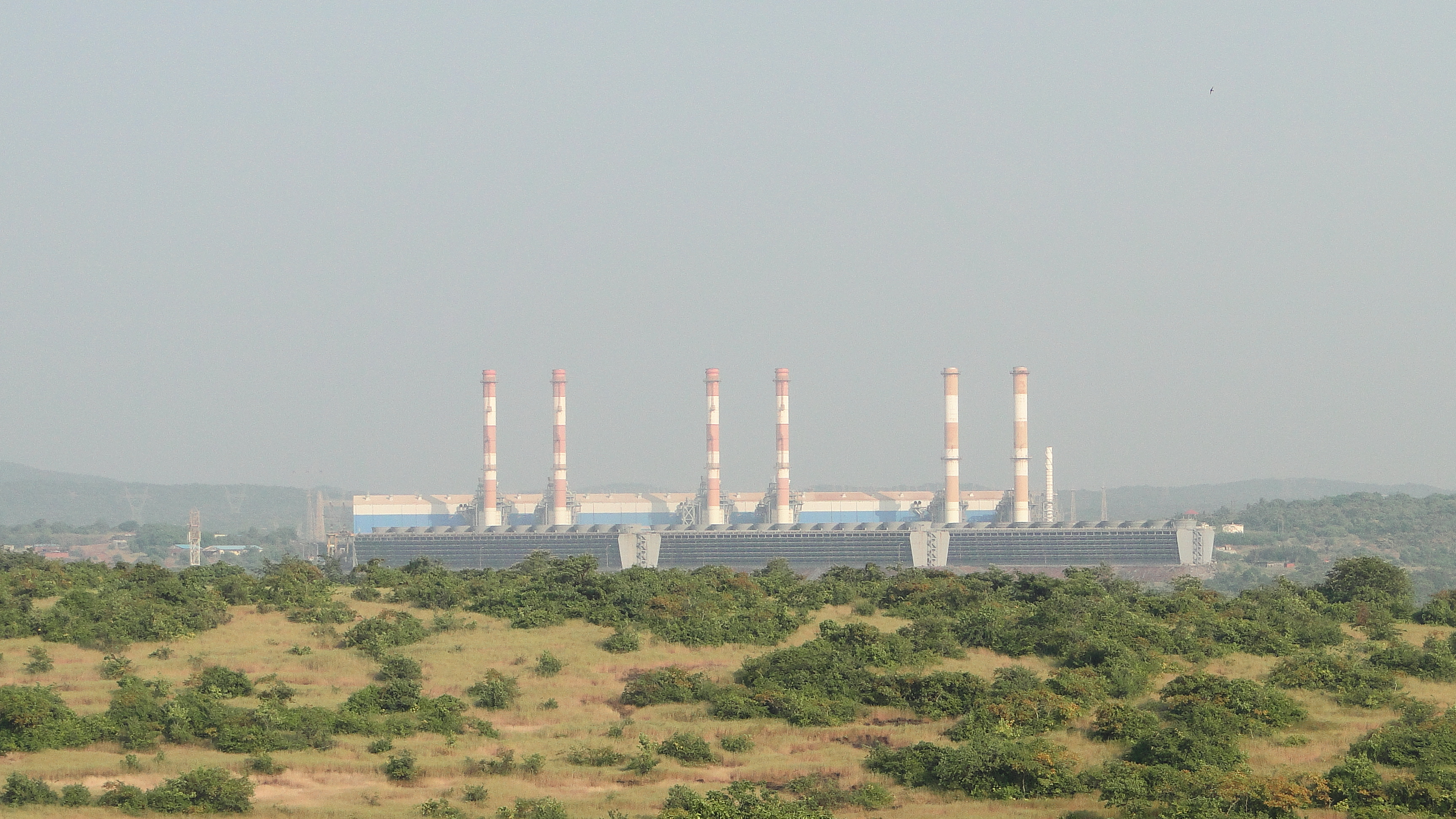
- Dabhol Power Station
- Location of the Ratnagiri Gas and Power Private Limited in Maharashtra
- Country: India
- Location: Ratnagiri, Maharashtra.
- Coordinates: 17°33′42″N 73°09′44″E
- Status: Operational
- Owner: NTPC GAIL

Thermal power station
- Primary fuel: Natural gas

Power generation
- Units operational: 3
- Nameplate capacity: 1,967 MW

External links
- Commons: Related media on Commons

Ratnagiri Gas and Power Private Limited (RGPPL) is a Subsidiary of NTPC Limited. The company was established as a JV between GAIL and NTPC to take over and revive the assets of the defunct Dabhol Power Company.

== History ==
The Ratnagiri Gas and Power company was made by the Government of Maharashtra and Government of India in 2005 to rescue the controversial and nearly defunct Dabhol power company, a gas powered electricity provider owned by Enron Corporation. In 1992, Enron Corporation signed a deal to build a gas powered power station along with integrated LNG terminal at Dabhol, from which the government of Maharashtra would purchase electricity for 20 years. The project remained controversial from the beginning, mostly due to the high cost of electricity (more than 2,000 times what the government was paying per unit for hydro electricity) and corruption at the highest levels. Despite protests, the project was built and began producing electricity in 1998. The Godbole committee report in 2001 presented a scathing criticism of the project and its terms. The plant stopped production in 2001 when the government could not pay for its electricity costs. In 2002, Enron became bankrupt. In 2005, the plant was taken over by the Government of Maharashtra.

The company was revived on 8 July 2005, with GAIL and NTPC each holding just over 25.51% of its equity. The Maharashtra State Electricity Board (MSEB) and financial institutions held the remaining stock.

RGPPL has commissioned the 5 million tonnes per year LNG Block (Commissioning cargo ‘LNG Pioneer’). The vessel carrying 1,38,000 cubic meters of Liquefied Natural Gas (LNG) docked at the jetty brought back the memories of the Enron’s aborted Dabhol Power Company's (DPC) power project. The DPC project was later taken over by the Central Government and renamed it as RGPPL which began operations in May 2006. Its three power blocks supply a combined 1967 MW of electricity to India's western grid.

== Capacity ==
Block	Unit Number	Installed Capacity (MW)	GT / ST
1st	1	640	GT
2nd	2	663.5	GT
3rd	3	663.5	GT
Total	Three	1967 MW	

== See also ==
- Dabhol Power Company
