= Nagpur–Bhusawal section =

Railway line in India

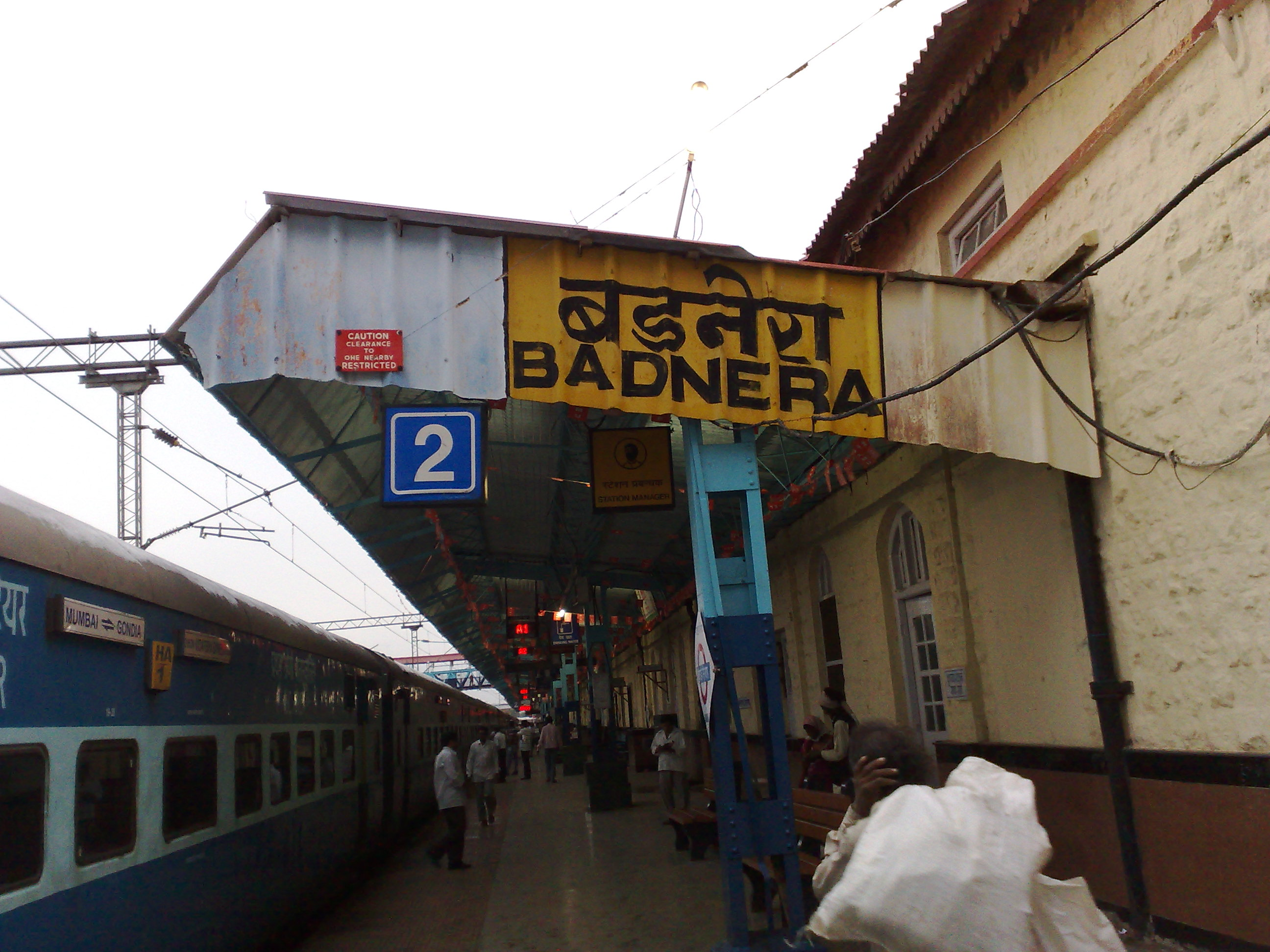
- Vidarbha Express arriving at Badnera Junction, an important train on Nagpur–Bhusawal section

Overview
- Status: Operational
- Owner: Indian Railways
- Locale: Maharashtra (Vidarbha and Khandesh)
- Termini: Nagpur; Bhusawal

Service
- System: Main line and some branch lines electrified. Some branch lines diesel.
- Services: Howrah–Nagpur–Mumbai line
- Operator(s): Central Railway
- Depot(s): Ajni, Bhusawal

History
- Opened: 1867

Technical
- Track length: Mainline: 389 km (242 mi); Branch lines: Shakuntala Railway: 189 km (117 mi); Pulgaon-Arvi 35 km (22 mi); Badnera–Narkhed: 138 km (86 mi); Butibori–Umrer branch line 34 km (21 mi)
- Number of tracks: Main line: 2
- Track gauge: Main line: 1,676 mm (5 ft 6 in) broad gauge
- Electrification: Yes
- Operating speed: Main line: up to 130 km/h
- Highest elevation: 314 metres (1,030 ft) at Nagpur, 284 metres (932 ft) Akola and 208 metres (682 ft) at Bhusawal

The Nagpur–Bhusawal section (railway track) is part of the Howrah–Nagpur–Mumbai line (alternatively known as Mumbai–Kolkata line / Bombay–Calcutta line) and connects Nagpur and Bhusawal both in the Indian state of Maharashtra. This section also has a number of branch lines. Part of one of the major trunk lines in the country, Nagpur–Bhusawal section passes through a section of the Deccan Plateau. The main line crosses Nagpur, Wardha, Amravati, Akola, and Buldhana districts of Vidarbha region and Jalgaon district of Khandesh region.

== History ==
The Great Indian Peninsula Railway extended the line from Bhusawal to Nagpur in 1867.

The 189 km (117 mi)-long, 2 ft 6 in (762 mm) gauge Achalpur–Murtajapur–Yavatmal line, known as the Shakuntala Railway was built by a British firm, Killik Nixon & Company, in 1903, to carry cotton from the interior of Vidarbha to the Howrah–Nagpur–Mumbai line at Murtajapur. The line, run by the Central Provinces Railways Company, is India's only operational private railway company listed on the Bombay Stock Exchange. The line is under conversion to 1,676 mm (5 ft 6 in) broad gauge.

The 35 km (22 mi)-long, 2 ft 6 in (762 mm) narrow-gauge railway was built from Pulgaon to Arvi by Central Provinces Railway in 1917. This line is also under conversion to 1,676 mm (5 ft 6 in) broad gauge.

The 34 km (21 mi)-long, 1,676 mm (5 ft 6 in) Butibori–Umrer branch line linking Umrer Coalfield to the main line was established in 1965. The newly laid 1,676 mm (5 ft 6 in) Narkhed–Amravati branch line was opened in 2012.

There was a 1,469 kilometres (913 mi)-long 1,000 mm (3 ft 3 3/8 in)-wide metre-gauge line from Jaipur to Secunderabad via Akola. Most of the part of this line has been converted to 1,676 mm (5 ft 6 in) broad gauge. The Great Indian Peninsula Railway was taken over by the state in 1925. In 1951, the Great Indian Peninsula Railway, the Nizam's Guaranteed State Railway, the Scindia State Railways and the Dholpur Railways were merged to form Central Railway.

The entire main line is electrified. Electrification of the railways in the region started in 1968–69 and continued up to Nandura in 1988–89. The Nandura-Badnera sector was electrified in 1989–90. The Badnera–Wardha sector was electrified in 1990–91. Badnera–Amaravati sector was electrified in 1993–94, Jalamb–Khamgaon and Butibori–Umrer in 1994–95.

In 1910, the District Gazetteer of Buldhana gave an account of the railway line and its importance from the point of view of trade:

The Nagpur Branch of the Great Indian Peninsula Railway runs a distance of about 47 miles through the District from west to east, and is connected with Khamgaon by a branch from Jalamb 8 miles in length. The railway stations in the District are Khamkhed, Malkapur, Biswa, Nandura, Jalamb, Khamgaon, Shegaon and Nagjhari. Of these the leading stations for exports and imports are Khamgaon, Shegaon and Malkapur. The first two stations despatch to Bombay mainly cotton and grain produced in the Khamgaon and Mehkar talukas and the greater portion of that produced in the Chikhli taluk; Malkapur sends away grain, linseed, cotton, gur and other articles which it receives from the Malkapur taluk and from the north-west portion of the Chikhli taluk. Nandura is the principal outlet of the Jalgaon taluk although it also exports certain produce from the Malkapur taluk.

== Loco sheds ==
There are electric locomotive sheds at Ajni and Bhusawal on this line and a narrow gauge diesel loco shed at Murtazapur. Ajni loco shed has WAG-7, WAG-9, WAP-7 and WAG-9I locos. Bhusawal loco shed has WAM-4, WAP-4, WAG-5, WAG-7 and WCM-6 locos.

== Workshops ==
Central Railway has three workshops on this line. Nagpur has a workshop for upkeep of passenger coaches and Ajni has facilities for repair of goods wagons. Bhusawal has a workshop for repairs of locos and wagons.

== Economy ==
This line passes through the cotton producing areas of Vidarbha. Mahagenco has two major power stations on this route – the 500 MW Paras Thermal Power Station and the 920 MW Bhusawal Thermal Power Station. Reliance Power has a 600 mW thermal power station at Butibori.

Coal-based thermal power stations consume large quantities of coal. For example, the Bhusawal Thermal Power Station consumed 2,400,000 tonnes of coal in 2006–07, and the Paras Thermal Power Station consumed 351,000 tonnes of coal in the same year. Around 80 per cent of the domestic coal supplies in India are meant for coal based thermal power plants and coal transportation forms 42 per cent of the total freight earnings of Indian railways. There are over 200 coal loading points across India. Coal is transported by rail to around 60 thermal power stations, 12 steel plants and 55 cement factories forming the major customers of coal.

== Speed and passenger movement ==
The entire Howrah–Nagpur–Mumbai line is classified as a "Group A" line which can take speeds up to 160 km/h (99 mph).

Nagpur, Akola and Bhusawal, on this line, are amongst the top hundred booking stations of Indian Railway.
