= Vijay Singhal =

Indian civil servant

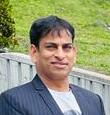

Chairman and Managing Director (CIDCO)
- Incumbent
- Assumed office 23 February 2024
- Preceded by: Anil Diggikar

General Manager Brihanmumbai Electric Supply and Transport
- In office 6 June 2023 – 23 February 2024
- Succeeded by: Anil Diggikar

Managing Director Maharashtra State Electricity Distribution Company Limited
- In office 1 February 2021 – 2 June 2023
- Succeeded by: Lokesh Chandra (IAS)

Personal details
- Education: IIT Roorkee
- Occupation: Indian Administrative Service officer

Vijay Singhal is a 1997 batch Indian Administrative Service officer and was the chairman and managing director of Maharashtra State Electricity Distribution Company Limited. On 2 June 2023 he was appointed G.M Brihanmumbai Electric Supply and Transport.. As of 23 February 2024 Singhal has been appointed VC & MD of (CIDCO).
