= Malkhed railway station =

Railway station in Maharashtra, India

Malkhed
- Indian Railways logo

General information
- Location: Lalkhed, Amravati District, Maharashtra; India
- Coordinates: 20.8222°N 77.8649°E
- Elevation: 344 metres (1,129 ft)
- Owner: Indian Railways
- Operator: Central Railway zone
- Line: Wardha–Badnera branch line
- Platforms: 3
- Tracks: 5

Construction
- Structure type: Standard (on ground station)
- Accessible: Yes

Other information
- Status: Functioning
- Station code: MLR
- Zone(s): Central Railway zone
- Division(s): Nagpur
- Fare zone: Indian Railways

Services
| Preceding station | Indian Railways | Following station |
|---|---|---|
| Chandur towards ? | Central Railway zone | Timtala towards ? |
Location
- Location within India Location within Maharashtra

Malkhed railway station is a small railway station located in Amravati District of Maharashtra state in Western India.

Its Indian Railways station code is MLR. It serves Malkhed town in Amravati district and its nearby areas. Currently 6 trains stop at Malkhed railway station
