= Anil Diggikar =

Indian civil servant

G.M Brihanmumbai Electric Supply and Transport
- Incumbent
- Assumed office 2024
- Preceded by: Vijay Singhal

(CIDCO)
- In office June 6, 2023 – February 25, 2024
- Preceded by: Sanjay Mukherjee
- Succeeded by: Vijay Singhal

Personal details
- Occupation: Indian Administrative Service officer

Anil Diggikar is an Indian Administrative Service officer and is the current G.M Brihanmumbai Electric Supply and Transport. Diggikar was the Vice Chairman and Managing Director (CIDCO).
