= Pradhan Mantri Kisan Urja Suraksha Evam Utthan Mahabhiyan Yojana =

Irrigation scheme in India

PM Kusum Scheme
- Type of project: Irrigation scheme
- Country: India
- Prime Minister(s): Narendra Modi
- Launched: March 2019; 7 years ago
- Status: Active

Pradhan Mantri Kisan Urja Suraksha evam Utthaan Mahabhiyan (KUSUM) Yojana was launched in March 2019 by the Government of India to increase the income of farmers and provide sources of irrigation and de-dieselization the agricultural sector. To receive the benefit of this scheme farmers need to install solar irrigation pumps for cultivation. Under this scheme, the government of India will provide 60% subsidy on the total cost of solar irrigation installed pumps to the farmer.

== Objective ==
The objective of the scheme is to:

- Decrease dependence on Diesel for irrigation
- Reduce cost of irrigation by use of solar pumps
- Provide water and energy security to farmers
- Reduce pollution
- Reduce the cost of farming and increasing the yearly income of farmers
- Motivate farmers to use Renewable Energy Sources for lowering the pollution

The PM-KUSUM scheme of the Government of India is one of the largest initiatives in the world to provide clean energy to more than 3.5 million farmers. It solarizes agricultural pumps and provides up 10 GW distributed solar projects to the farmers. The scheme plans to set up 30.8 GW of solar capacity by 31 December 2022, through the financial assistance of INR 340.35 billion (US$4.65 billion).

== Implementation ==
Government of India

The scheme is divided into three components:

- Component A: Install grid-connected ground-mounted solar power plants (up to 2 MW) aggregating to a total capacity of 10 GW.
- Component B: Install 1.75 million worth of standalone solar pumps.
- Component C: Solarize 1 million worth grid-connected agricultural pumps.

All components of the KUSUM Scheme combined would support the installation of the additional solar capacity of 30.80 GW.

Under Kusum Yojana, a group of farmers, panchayats, and cooperatives can apply to install solar pumps. The total cost included in this scheme is divided into three categories in which the government will help the farmers. The government will provide a 60% subsidy to the farmers, and 30% of the cost will be given by the government in the form of a loan. Farmers will only have to pay 10% of the total cost of the project. Farmers can sell electricity generated from solar panels. The money earned by selling electricity can be used to start a new businesses.

== PM Kusum Yojana Benefits ==
Under the PM Kusum Yojana, farmers are provided with the following benefits:

1. Subsidy: Farmers receive a subsidy ranging from 30% to 90% for installing solar pumps.
2. Reduced Dependency on Diesel: The installation of solar pumps reduces reliance on diesel and other traditional energy sources.
3. Electricity Savings: Solar-powered pumps decrease electricity consumption, which helps lower the farmers' expenses.
4. Source of Additional Income: Farmers can earn extra income by selling surplus solar energy back to the grid.
5. Green Energy: Through this scheme, farmers contribute to environmental protection by utilizing green energy.
6. Cost Reduction: Lower electricity costs improve the farmers' economic conditions, increasing their overall income.
