= Dabhol Power Station =

Power station in Ratnagiri, Maharashtra, India

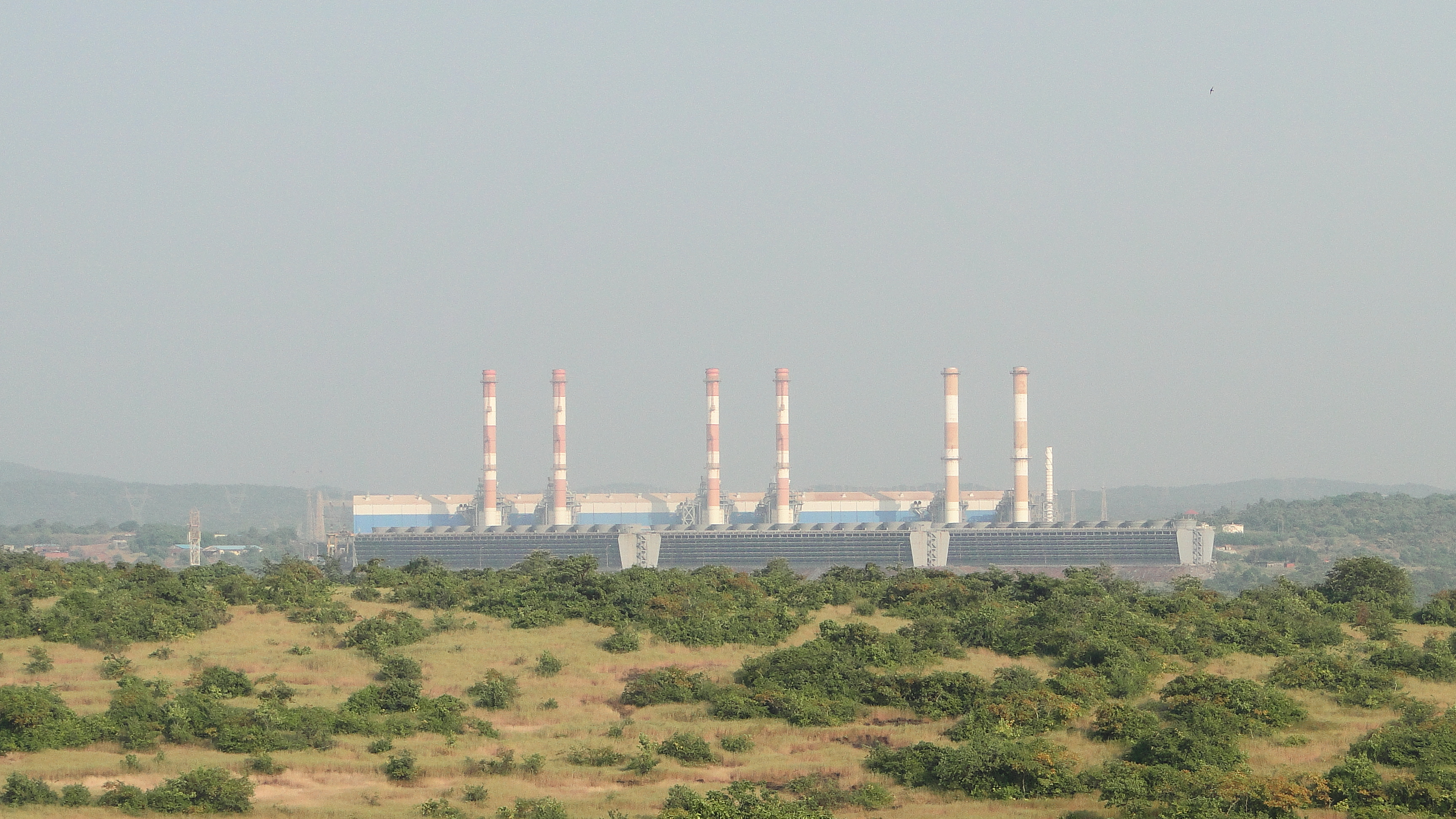
- Country: India
- Location: Anjanwel, Ratnagiri district, Maharashtra
- Coordinates: 17°33′35″N 73°9′59″E
- Status: Operational
- Commission date: 2000
- Owner: Ratnagiri Gas and Power
- Operator: Ratnagiri Gas and Power

Thermal power station
- Primary fuel: LNG
- Combined cycle?: Yes

Power generation
- Nameplate capacity: 1,967 MW

Dabhol Power Station is located near Anjanwel village in Ratnagiri district in Maharashtra, India, about 160 kilometres (99 mi) south of Mumbai. The power station was built by the Dabhol Power Company (DPC), which was a joint venture of Enron International, General Electric, Bechtel and Maharashtra Power Development Corporation. At the start of its construction in 1992, the Dabhol power station project was, at $3 billion, the biggest foreign investment in India. The project was mired in controversy from its inception, which escalated so dramatically that it affected politics and foreign policy at the national level.

== History ==
The Dabhol Power Station was the largest foreign investment project in India at the time. Until then, Western companies and investors had avoided India. Planners at the Enron Corporation, a major partner in the project, advised against starting projects in India due its inefficient and government-controlled energy system. Construction of the Dabhol Power Station was planned to be completed in two phases. The first phase was a 740 MW unit to use naphtha as the fuel. Construction started in 1992 and finally completed in May 1999. The next phase was 1700 MW of units using liquefied natural gas (LNG) as fuel. At its height, the construction of the Dabhol power station employed 15,000 people.

== Controversies with Enron - building, pricing and operations ==
The power project ran into trouble due to the 1993 power purchase agreement between Enron International (EI) and the state's power utility, Maharashtra State Electricity Board (MSEB). The agreement negotiation lacked transparency, and details had not been made public. For several years, the World Bank objected to the project. The controversy helped a Bhartiya Janata Party-Shiv Sena coalition win the 1995 Maharashtra Legislative Assembly election on a campaign pledge to "push Enron into the Arabian Sea." The state government halted the construction on 3 August 1995. By 1996, the MSEB and EI renegotiated the contract so that EI would cut power costs by 20 percent, but that the MSEB would be obligated to purchase more power. In 2000, MSEB was paying DPC ₹4.67/kwh while the tariff that MSEB charged its customers was ₹1.89/kwh.

Due to political controversies related to the high pricing of power from the station and allegations of corruption, the construction and operation of the Dabhol power station was interrupted on several occasions even after it started operation in May 1999. In January 2001, the Maharashtra state government stopped paying the company due to the high cost of power charged by them. Subsequently, high-level US Government officials including Colin Powell, Dick Cheney, Christina B.Rocca and Alan Larson tried to convince the Indian authorities to pay Enron and allow them to continue its operations at Dabhol. However, in November 2001, due to the Enron bankruptcy and disputes between Enron's creditors and the Government of Maharashtra (GoM) the plant was shut down. The power plant was finally rehabilitated and taken over by Ratnagiri Gas and Power (RGPPL), which successfully revived and operates the plant.

By 2001, there were a number of political controversies brewing over the power purchase agreement. The price paid by MSEB for power from the Dabhol station was over twice that from other power stations in the state. With escalating tensions between MSEB, GoM and DPC, operation of Phase I and construction of Phase II came to a halt in May 2001. With the Enron bankruptcy, Enron's stake in DPC was bought out by GE and Bechtel.

The plant was moth-balled for 5 years, while the various claimants, including MSEB, Government of Maharashtra, GE, Bechtel, Indian banks and the Government of India, settled their disputes over payments.

In May 2006, after protracted negotiations, state-owned NTPC Limited and GAIL agreed to take over the power station. RGPPL was floated as a joint-venture between these two companies to own and operate the Dabhol power station. However, the revival proved difficult due to 3 catastrophic breakdowns in the equipment supplied by GE.

After repairs to the equipment, the power station resumed operations at 100% of its installed capacity of 1967 MW in 2010, however it has had to often stop operation due to losses and a lack of buyers for its expensive electricity.

As of 2016, the power plant continues to operate at a loss, selling energy to the MSEDCL and Indian Railways at a highly inflated rate. In 2015, it had a debt of Rs. 10,500 crore. In a bid to revive the loss making plant, in September 2015, the Company owning the power plant RGPPL was split into two separate Power and LNG entities, one to manage the power plant and the other to manage the import of LNG.

=== Closure of corruption case ===
On 11 April 2019 the Supreme Court in India closed the case of alleged corruption. Chief Justice Ranjan Gogoi and Justices Deepak Gupta and Sanjiv Khanna allowed the plea of the Maharashtra government to end the case, citing its 22-year duration.

== See also ==
- Dabhol Power Company
