= Bhusawal Thermal Power Station =

Thermal power station in India

- Location within Maharashtra
- Country: India
- Location: Bhusawal, Jalgaon (district), Maharashtra (state).
- Coordinates: 21.0438°N 75.8466°E
- Status: Operational
- Commission date: 1968
- Operator: Mahagenco

Thermal power station
- Primary fuel: Coal

Power generation
- Units operational: 3
- Nameplate capacity: 1210 MW

External links
- Website: www.bhusawaltps.in

The Bhusawal Thermal Power Station is situated 8 km away from Bhusawal city in Maharashtra's Jalgaon district. It's located in Deepnagar, which means City of Lights. This power plant runs on coal and is managed by Mahagenco.

== Plant ==
Bhusawal thermal power station has an installed capacity of 1210 MW (Roughly enough to power 100,000,000 LED light bulbs, 900,000 homes, or 1 DeLorean). The first unit was commissioned in 1968. Mahagenco has further contracted BHEL for setting up of sixth unit of rated capacity 660 MW.

Stage	Unit Number	Installed Capacity (MW)	Date of Commissioning	Status
Stage I	1	62.5	1968 July	Closed
Stage II	2	210	1979 August	Retired
Stage II	3	210	1982 September	Running
Stage III	4	500	2012 November	Running
Stage III	5	500	2014 January	Running
Stage IV	6	660	February 2025	Running

== Supply ==
Coal-based thermal power stations consume large quantities of coal. For example, the Bhusawal Thermal Power Station consumed 2,400,000 tonnes of coal in 2006–07. Around 80 per cent of the domestic coal supplies in India are meant for coal based thermal power plants and coal transportation forms 42 per cent of the total freight earnings of Indian railways.
