= Dabhol Power Company =

Indian power company

The Dabhol Power Company (now called RGPPL - Ratnagiri Gas and Power Private Limited) was a company based in Maharashtra, India, formed in 1992 to manage and operate the controversial Dabhol Power Plant. The Dabhol plant was built through the combined effort of Enron as the majority shareholder, and GE and Bechtel as minority shareholders. GE provided the generating turbines to Dabhol, Bechtel constructed the physical plant, and Enron was charged with managing the project through Enron International. From 1992 to 2001, the construction and operation of the plant was mired in controversies related to corruption in Enron and at the highest political levels in India and the United States (Clinton administration and Bush administration). The price that the state electricity board would have to pay for electricity produced by DPC (8 Rs/unit) was more than 20 times what it paid for hydroelectricity (Rs. 0.35/unit).

In 1998, MSEB purchased half of Enron's equity stake. In May 1999, the power plant began producing energy. In January 2001 the state of Maharashtra stopped paying DPC and sought to cancel the purchase agreement. In May 2001, the power plant ran into further trouble due to Enron scandal leading to the bankruptcy of Enron and had to stop production.

In 2005, it was taken over and revived by converting it into the RGPPL (Ratnagiri Gas and Power Private Limited), a company owned by the Government of India.

== The infrastructure development ==
Starting in the mid-1990s, Unocal and its partners planned to build a 1,000 mile gas pipeline from Turkmenistan to Multan, in Pakistan at a cost of about $2 billion. Also considered was a route from Iran to Multan which was seen as feasible due to Iran's huge oil and gas reserves. However, In 1996 when the sanctions against Iran were imposed, the FBI blocked the plan, and it was forcibly cancelled. A proposed 400 mile extension from Multan to New Delhi would bring some of the gas into India's network of gas pipelines at a cost of $600 million.

A sea route from Gwadar, Pakistan, to Dabhol, India, was never considered despite both locations being coastal towns.

== Financing ==
In 1992, Enron approached the government of Maharashtra with the idea of setting up a 2,184 Megawatts LNG powered plant at Dabhol, Ratnagiri. LNG for the project would be imported from Qatar through a 20 year contract with Enron, and the electricity produced would be purchased by the Government of Maharashtra for 20 years.

However, the World Bank found issues with the feasibility of the project and hence refused to give a loan for the same. Instead the project was financed by Enron, Bechtel, GE and five major lenders, one of which was located in India:

- Enron Power Corp. - $223 million
- Bechtel Enterprises - $28 million
- General Electric- $28 million
- Lender - Export–Import Bank of the United States - $298 million
- Bank of America - $150 million
- Overseas private investment corp - $100 million
- Industrial Development Bank of India - $95 million
- Eurobank guarantors

== Dabhol Power Station ==
The plant was to be constructed in two phases. In March 1995, the ruling Congress Party in Maharashtra lost to a nationalist coalition (of Shiv Sena and Bharatiya Janata Party - BJP) that had campaigned on an anti-foreign investment platform. In May, hundreds of protesting villagers swarmed over the site to protest the displacement of people that would take place, and a riot broke out. Human Rights Watch and Amnesty International eventually charged the security forces guarding Dabhol for Enron with human-rights abuses; Human Rights Watch blamed Enron for being complicit. On August 3, the Maharashtra state government ordered the project to be halted because of "lack of transparency, alleged padded costs, and environmental hazards." Construction ground to a halt. By then, Enron had invested about $300 million into the project.

=== Phase One ===
Phase one was set to burn naphtha, a fuel similar to kerosene and gasoline. Phase one would produce 740 megawatts and help stabilize the local transmission grid. The power plant's phase one project was started in 1992 and finally completed two years behind schedule.

=== Phase Two ===
Phase two would burn liquefied natural gas (LNG). The LNG infrastructure associated with the LNG Terminal at Dabhol was going to cost around $1 billion.

In 1996 when India's Congress Party was no longer in power, the Indian government assessed the project as being excessively expensive and refused to pay for the plant and stopped construction. The Maharashtra State Electricity Board (MSEB), the local state-run utility, was required by contract to continue to pay Enron plant maintenance charges, even if no power was purchased from the plant. The MSEB determined that it could not afford to purchase the power (at Rs. 8 per unit kWh) charged by Enron. From 1996 until Enron's bankruptcy in 2001 the company tried to revive the project and spark interest in India's need for the power plant without success. The project was widely criticized for excess costs and deemed a white elephant. Socialist groups cited the project as an example of corporate profiteering over public good. Over the next year Enron reviewed its options. On February 23, 1996, the then government of Maharashtra and Enron announced a new agreement. Enron cut the price of the power by over 20 percent, cut total capital costs from $2.8 billion to $2.5 billion, and increased Dabhol's output from 2,015 megawatts to 2,184 megawatts. Both parties committed formally to develop the second phase. The first phase went online May 1999, almost two years behind schedule, and construction was started on phase two. Costs would now ultimately climb to $3 billion. Then everything came to halt. The MSEB refused to pay for all the power, and it became clear that getting the government to honor the guarantees would not be an easy task. Although Maharashtra still suffers from blackouts, it says it does not need and cannot afford Dabhol's power. India's energy sector still loses roughly $5 billion a year. This plant was taken over by Ratnagiri Gas and Power Private limited in July 2005.

== Dabhol Today ==
The power plant Phase I which was renamed Ratnagiri Gas and Power Pvt Ltd (RGPPL) started operation in May 2006, after a hiatus of over five years. However, the Dabhol plant ran into further problems, with RGPPL shutting down the plant on 4 July 2006 due to a lack of naphtha supply. The Qatar based company RasGas Company Ltd. started supplying LNG to the plant in April 2007.

The Dabhol Power plant consists of three blocks, each consisting of two GE make frame nine gas turbines and one GE steam turbine. Block 2 commissioning work and Gas turbine 2A trial runs started on 25 April 2007. The Dabhol Power Plant Project was again made operational in April 2009 with 900 MW RLNG fired running capacity but problems continued due to non-availability of operational insurance. Decisions tend to be largely dependent upon political developments in the country as well as performance of newly repaired rotors. As of 2016, the company was operating at a colossal loss, selling expensive electricity to either the state owned MSEDCL or India railways for survival.

In September 2015, the company had a total debt of nearly Rs. 10,500 crore. In a bid to try and revive the loss making plant, the Company owning the power plant RGPPL was split into two separate Power (RGPPL) and LNG entities (Konkan LNG Private Limited (KLPL)), one to manage the power plant and the other to try and manage the import of LNG.

== See also ==
- Trans-Afghanistan Pipeline
