= Tillari Dam =

Tillari Dam may refer to following dams located close to each other:

- Tillari (Forebay) Dam, in Kolhapur district, Maharashtra state of India
- Tillari (Main) Dam, in Kolhapur district, Maharashtra state of India
