= Paras Thermal Power Station =

- Country: India
- Location: Paras, Akola, Maharashtra
- Coordinates: 20.718548°N 76.800056°E
- Status: Operational
- Commission date: 1961
- Operator: Maharashtra State Power Generation Company (Mahagenco)

Thermal power station
- Primary fuel: Coal

Power generation
- Units operational: 4
- Nameplate capacity: 500 MW

External links
- Website: www.parastps.co.in

"Paras Thermal Power Plant" is located at Paras, in the Akola district of Maharashtra. The power plant is a coal based power plant operated by Mahagenco.

== Power plant ==
Paras Thermal Power Station is the oldest of all Mahagenco Power plants. The station has witnessed the third generation technology. The station had 30 MW installed capacity in 1961 with a stroke boiler. The same unit was abandoned in 1993 due to ageing.

== Installed capacity ==
Stage	Unit Number	Installed Capacity (MW)	Date of Commissioning	Status
Stage I	1	30	1961	Abandoned
Stage I	2	62.5	1967	Abandoned
Stage II	3	250	2008 March	Running
Stage II	4	250	2010 August	Running

== Transport ==
It is on the Nagpur–Bhusawal section of Central Railway. Coal-based thermal power stations consume large quantities of coal. For example, the Paras Thermal Power Station consumed 351,000 tonnes of coal in 2006–07. Around 80 per cent of the domestic coal supplies in India are meant for coal based thermal power plants and coal transportation forms 42 per cent of the total freight earnings of Indian railways.

== Famous personalities ==
- Paras is home town of Shivdeep Lande (IPS) and Dr. Niyaz Ahmed (Scientist)
