= Lokesh Chandra (civil servant) =

Indian civil servant

Managing Director Maharashtra State Electricity Distribution Company Limited
- Incumbent
- Assumed office June 02, 2023
- Preceded by: Vijay Singhal

General Manager Brihanmumbai Electric Supply and Transport
- In office June 05, 2021 – June 02, 2023

Chairman and Managing Director (CIDCO)
- In office May 10, 2018 – June 05, 2021

Personal details
- Occupation: Indian Administrative Service officer

Lokesh Chandra is a 1993 Batch Officer of the Indian Administrative Service. Chandra was the VC City and Industrial Development Corporation, G.M Brihanmumbai Electric Supply and Transport and is the current chairman and managing director of Maharashtra State Electricity Distribution Company Limited.
