= Nashik Thermal Power Station =

Building in India

- Country: India
- Location: Nashik, Nashik, Maharashtra
- Coordinates: 19.979721°N 73.891168°E
- Status: Operational
- Commission date: 1970
- Operator: Maharashtra State Power Generation Company (Mahagenco)

Thermal power station
- Primary fuel: Coal

Power generation
- Units operational: 5
- Nameplate capacity: 880.00 MW

External links
- Website: mahagenco.in

Nashik Thermal Power Plant is located at Eklahare village near Nashik in Maharashtra. It is one of the coal based power plants of Maharashtra State Power Generation Company (Mahagenco).

== Power plant ==
Nashik Thermal Power Station has an installed capacity of 140x2 + 210x3 = 910 MW. The first unit was commissioned in 1970. The cost of the unit including civil works was Rs 56.5 crores. The second unit was commissioned with the same cost under the first stage. The second stage consistsed of three units of 210 MW each, commissioned in the later years.

The power station campus includes a self-contained township with all amenities. The entire land consists of 474 hectares.

The power plant received ISO certification in April 2002.

The first head of the station was Sri Karanjkar, assisted by Sri CL Gupta and Sri Sen Gupta. Gupta was assisted in the boiler maintenance department by Sri C.N. Swamy, and the turbine maintenance department was headed by Sri Agashe.

The second stage of the power station 3x210 MW was started in April 1976. Sri C.N.Swamy was appointed as the first project manager to oversee the construction and commissioning of the plant. The first unit was commissioned in 1980.

== Installed capacity ==
| Stage | Unit number | Installed capacity (MW) | Date of commissioning | Status |
|---|---|---|---|---|
| Stage I | 1 | 140 | August 1970 | Stopped (under renovation) |
| Stage I | 2 | 140 | March 1971 | Stopped (under renovation) |
| Stage II | 3 | 210 | April 1979 | Running |
| Stage II | 4 | 210 | July 1980 | Running |
| Stage II | 5 | 210 | January 1981 | Running |

Maharashtra State Power Generation Company (Mahagenco) is planning to deploy a 660 MW super-critical unit at the same location just like the current plant. This project will be stationed adjacent to the existing stage-I plant (2 x 140 MW) site at village Eklahare. The land requirement for the proposed project is about 36.6 hectares. The coal sources will be from Mahanadi coal blocks by MahaGuj Collieries.

The total cost of the project is around Rs 4,390 crore. 20% contribution will be by the state government, amounting to Rs 878 crore. The remaining funds will be supported from several lending institutions.

== Transport ==
It is on the Bhusawal–Kalyan section of the Central Railway.

Coal-based thermal power stations consume large quantities of coal. The Nasik Thermal Power Station consumed 4,626,000 tones of coal in 2006–07. Around 80 per cent of the domestic coal supplies in India are meant for coal based thermal power plants, and coal transportation forms 42 per cent of the total freight earnings of Indian railways.
