= Uran Gas Turbine Power Station =

Coordinates: 18.8814°N 72.9702°E

Uran Gas Turbine Power Station is a gas-based thermal power plant located at Uran in Raigad district, Maharashtra. The power plant is operated by the Maharashtra State Power Generation Company (Mahagenco).

== Capacity ==
It has an installed capacity of 672 MW (4x108 MW, 2x120 MW). The Technical Director and Chief Engineer who were overseeing the Project were Sri PV Garde and Sri C.N.Swamy respectively.
