= Maharashtra State Electricity Transmission Company =

Subsidiary of Maharashtra State Electricity Board (MSEB)

Maharashtra State Electricity Transmission Company Limited महापारेषण
- Type: Subsidiary of Maharashtra State Electricity Board
- Industry: Electricity transmission
- Founded: 6 June 2005 (As MSEB was trifurcated)
- Headquarters: Bandra, Mumbai, India
- Area served: Maharashtra
- Key people: Chairman and Managing Director Shri Dinesh Waghmare, IAS
- Products: Electricity
- Parent: government of Maharashtra
- Website: https://www.mahatransco.in

Mahapareshan or Mahatransco (Maharashtra State Electricity Transmission Company Limited - MSETCL) is a wholly owned by government of Maharashtra and the major electricity transmission company in the state of Maharashtra, India. Since 2003 it has been converted to state-owned Electricity Companies.

== Company profile ==
Maharashtra State Electricity Transmission Company limited, a wholly owned corporate entity under the Maharashtra Government, was incorporated under the Companies Act, in June, 2005 after restructuring the erstwhile Maharashtra State Electricity Board to transmit electricity from its point of Generation to its point of Distribution.

It owns and operates most of Maharashtra's Electric Power Transmission System. MSETCL operates a transmission network of 39871 Circuit KM of transmission lines and 559 EHV Substations with 89178 MVA transformation capacity. This infrastructure constitutes most of the inter regional as well as intra regional electric power transmission system in the State.

The company also has the distinction of being the only power utility in the state sector to own HVDC lines. The Company operates a 752 km long, 1500 MW, 500 KV bi-polar HVDC line from Chandrapur to Padghe. This has been marked as a major success as electric power is generated in east Maharashtra, due to easy availability of coal, whereas the bulk use of power is in the western part of Maharashtra in and around cities such as Mumbai, Pune and Nashik. The power losses are very low in the HVDC line. As a result, the power received at Padghe is practically the same as what is injected at Chandrapur.

It has installed ABT metering at 530 Sub-stations for energy accounting purposes and implementation of FBSM. The ERP system is fully integrated and being put into use, where functions of key departments are on line. To set up a comprehensive communication network by utilizing existing infrastructure, an Optic Fibre communication system of about 2801 km is being installed. It has also experimented with unmanned remotely controlled substations at two locations and GIS substations at Bhandup and Hinjawadi. It October 2025, it announced to develop infratructure to bring in more renewable energy.

The Company has adopted the National Training Policy and has established Training Centres at 7 different locations which are attached to respective Zonal offices. These centres impart training on Technical, Safety and Soft skills which are guided and monitored by the HR/Training Department. It has recently established a Technical Training Centre - the Power System Learning Centre - at Aurangabad where employees are trained on various power system protection and equipment testing. Recently the Company won the "Special Commendation National Award 2011" for Innovative Training Practices from the Indian Society for Training and Development, New Delhi.

In March 2026, it gave a Rs.700 crore EPC order for a 400/220 kv Saswad substation in Pune.

== See also ==
- Maharashtra Electricity Regulatory Commission
- Energy law
