= Totaladoh =

- town
- Location in Maharashtra, India
- Coordinates: 21.6468°N 79.2454°E
- Country: India
- State: Maharashtra
- District: Nagpur

Population (2001)
  - Total: 2,336

Languages
  - Official: Marathi
- Time zone: UTC+5:30 (IST)

Totaladoh is a census town in Nagpur district in the Indian state of Maharashtra.

== Demographics ==
As of 2001 India census, Totaladoh had a population of 2336. Males constituted 51% of the population and females 49%. Totaladoh had an average literacy rate of 65%, higher than the national average of 59.5%: male literacy was 74%, and female literacy was 56%. In Totaladoh, 12% of the population was under 6 years of age.
