= Maharashtra Electricity Regulatory Commission =

Regulatory body in Maharashtra, India

Agency overview
- Formed: 5 August 1999; 27 years ago
- Jurisdiction: Maharashtra government
- Headquarters: Mumbai
- Employees: Classified
- Agency executive: Valsa Nair singh (IAS), Chairman
- Website: http://www.merc.gov.in

Maharashtra Electricity Regulatory Commission (MERC) (http://www.merc.gov.in) is a governing body to control certain regulatory and safety functions in Maharashtra based in Mumbai. It was incorporated under the Electricity Regulatory Commission Act, 1998, of Central Act in August 1999. In 2003, it was continued as regulatory body under Section 82 of the Electricity Act. It was established to promote competition, efficiency and economy in the power sector. It also regulates tariffs of power generation, transmission and distribution in Maharashtra.

== See also ==
- Maharashtra State Electricity Distribution Company Limited
- Maharashtra State Electricity Transmission Company Limited
- Maharashtra State Power Generation Company Limited
- Brihanmumbai Electric Supply and Transport
- Maharashtra Energy Development Agency
- Tata Power
