= Maharashtra State Electricity Distribution Company Limited =

Wholly owned subsidiary of the Maharashtra State Electricity Board ( MSEB )

Maharashtra State Electricity Distribution Company Limited महावितरण
- Type: State Government PSU Subsidiary of Maharashtra State Electricity Board
- Industry: Electricity distribution
- Founded: 6 June 2005 (carved out of MSEB)
- Headquarters: Mumbai, Maharashtra, India
- Area served: 307,713 km^{2} (118,809 sq mi) 534 towns & 44,778 villages of Maharashtra
- Key people: Shri. Lokesh Chandra, IAS
- Products: Electricity
- Revenue: ₹1,27,997 crore [$15.24 billion USD] for 2024-25
- Number of employees: 54,938 (2025)
- Parent: Government of Maharashtra
- Website: Home page

Mahavitaran or Mahadiscom or MSEDCL (Maharashtra State Electricity Distribution Company Limited) (stylized as MΛHΛVITARAN) is a wholly owned subsidiary of the Maharashtra State Electricity Board. It is the largest electricity distribution utility in India ( 2nd largest in the World after SGCC). MSEDCL distributes electricity to the entire state of Maharashtra except for some parts of Mumbai city where Brihanmumbai Electric Supply and Transport, Tata Power and Adani Electricity Mumbai Limited are electricity distributors.

== History ==
The erstwhile Maharashtra State Electricity Board (MSEB) was looking after the generation, transmission & distribution of electricity in the state of Maharashtra. With the enactment of the Electricity Act 2003 of the Government of India, MSEB was unbundled into four companies on 6 June 2005 viz.

- MSEB Holding Company Limited
- Mahanirmiti (महानिर्मिती) or Mahagenco (Maharashtra State Power Generation Company Limited (MSPGCL))
- Mahapareshan (महापारेषण) or Mahatransco (Maharashtra State Electricity Transmission Company Limited (MSETCL))
- Mahavitaran (महावितरण) or Mahadiscom (Maharashtra State Electricity Distribution Company Limited (MSEDCL))

Of these, Mahavitaran is responsible for the distribution of electricity throughout the state by buying power from either MahaGenco, Captive Power Plants, or from other State Electricity Boards and Private sector power generation companies. The 'MSEB Holding Company' was created to hold all the stakes in these three companies.

== Customers ==
As per the latest data, MSEDCL serves a total of 3.16 crore consumers, with the residential category forming the largest share at 74.69% of total connections, followed by agriculture at 15.17%. Despite its smaller consumer base, the agriculture sector accounts for the highest energy consumption at 53.48% of total usage (9,177 MUs). HT-industrial consumers, though only 0.05% of the total, contribute significantly with 19.51% of energy consumption (3,348 MUs). Other major segments include LT-industrial (6.06%) and HT-other (4.61%). Overall, MSEDCL recorded a total consumption of 17,160 million units (MUs), reflecting a diverse consumer mix and energy usage pattern across Maharashtra.

== Financials ==
In FY 2024–25, MSEDCL reported standalone revenue from operations of ₹1,21,707 crore and total income of ₹1,27,997 crore [$15.24 billion USD]. After recognising a ₹8,208 crore net movement in regulatory deferral balances, the company posted a profit of ₹922 crore. Total assets stood at ₹1,96,162 crore, funded by equity of ₹44,339 crore and liabilities including ₹90,659 crore of borrowings (₹64,845 crore non‑current; ₹25,814 crore current). Trade receivables were ₹59,015 crore, while cash and cash equivalents were ₹8,214 crore as of 31 March 2025. Other equity remained negative at ₹(5,433) crore, reflecting accumulated losses from prior periods despite the year's profit.

== Organisation structure ==
MSEDCL operates through a network of offices consisting of a corporate office in Mumbai, four regional offices (Konkan, Pune, Aurangabad and Nagpur), 16 zonal offices, 44 circle offices, and 145 divisional offices.

== Sources of power ==
MSEDCL's sources of power include thermal, hydro, gas, and non-conventional sources like solar, wind, bagasse, etc. apart from hydropower of the Koyna Hydroelectric Project. Thermal power constitutes the major share which it gets from Mahagenco projects, central sector projects, and RGPPL.

Capacity addition plan of MSEDCL
Source (MW)	Commissioned capacity (as on 31.03.2024)	FY-2024-25	FY-2025-26	FY-2026-27	FY-2027-28	FY-2028-29	FY-2029-30	FY-2030-31	FY-2031-32	FY-2032-33	FY-2033-34	Capacity addition	Total
Thermal+gas	21891	660	0	0	1828	855	0	0	0	0	0	3343	25234
Nuclear	1191	0	0	0	0	0	0	0	0	0	0	0	1191
Large-hydro	2636	183	109	313	104	0	288	323	0	0	0	1320	3956
PSP-storage	250	0	0	750	1750	2074	0	0	0	0	0	4574	4824
Wind	2823	0	0	0	0	0	0	0	0	0	0	0	2855
Solar	4331	2095	9587	12364	1000	3000	0	0	0	0	0	28045	32377
Hybrid	0	0	300	780	3264	0	0	0	0	0	0	4344	4344
FDRE	0	0	0	1468	0	0	0	0	0	0	0	1468	1468
Bagasse+biomass	2731	180	345	345	0	0	0	0	0	0	0	870	3601
Small hydro	314	3	0	0	0	0	0	0	0	0	0	3	317
Total	36167	3121	9887	15816	4922	6682	2929	0	0	288	323	43967	80167

== Infrastructure ==
MSEDCL operates one of India's largest power distribution networks, ensuring electricity supply across urban and rural Maharashtra. The system comprises 4,313 substations, 28,703 outgoing feeders, and over 9.68 lakh distribution transformers, supported by 7,889 power transformers. The extensive transmission network includes 448,135 circuit kilometres of high-tension (HT) lines and 717,448 circuit kilometres of low-tension (LT) lines (as of April 2024). MSEDCL serves a massive consumer base of 3.16 crore consumers (31.6 million LT and 25,579 HT consumers) spread across 44,778 villages and 534 towns. The utility efficiently managed a maximum demand of 26,495 MW on 18 March 2025, reflecting its robust infrastructure and operational capability. The agricultural sector is a major focus, with 8,714 agricultural feeders, ensuring reliable power supply to the farming community.

== Human resource development ==
MSEDCL employs approximately 55,000 personnel and supplies electricity to over 3.5 crore consumers in Maharashtra. The workforce includes engineers, technical staff, and administrative officers involved in electricity distribution and infrastructure operations. The organization also conducts public safety programs.

== Major achievements post-restructuring ==
Maharashtra has a record number, highest as compared to any state, of agricultural pumps energized so far. The number is about 30 lakhs. Earlier, there was a long list of pending applications and the farmers used to wait for years together for supply. The issue was addressed in a proper perspective by MSEDCL. Nowadays about 1 lakh agricultural pumps are energized every year. MSEDCL, in a year or two, would be in a position to grant agricultural connections on-demand on par with other categories of consumers.

== Loss reduction ==
In five years, MSEDCL reduced distribution losses from 35% to 20% through various drives such as:

=== Anti-theft drive ===
This is being implemented on regular basis. MSEDCL has established 50 flying squads functioning under Security and Enforcement department to detect and handle power theft cases quickly.

=== Meter shifting ===
For many consumers, meters were installed in hard-to-access places, making theft easy to conceal. MSEDCL, therefore, decided to shift all meters to the front of buildings to make them as conspicuous as possible. This project is currently in progress on a large scale.

=== Mass meter replacement project ===
MSEDCL has decided to replace all the meters which have been in service for the last 10 years and more under the mass meter replacement program. It is planned to replace all the electromechanical meters with static ones. A process has already been initiated for purchasing about 30 lakh meters for the purpose. This is a huge project which will definitely lead to increase in metered sales.

=== Energy accounting ===
MSEDCL has undertaken accurate energy accounting through various methods such as :

=== Feeder metering ===
MSEDCL plans to install high-quality meters at all necessary system points, including interconnecting points. Feeder metering of all 10,240 feeders in complete and again, photo reading of these feeder meters are taken.

=== DTC metering ===
There are total 2,84,633 distribution transformer centers (DTCs) in operation, out of which about 1.51 lakh DTCs have already been metered.

=== Distribution franchisee ===
Bhiwandi, a power loom city, had typical problems like rampant theft and non-payment. MSEDCL opted for an input-based franchisee model for electricity distribution. It has handed over Bhiwandi Circle to M/S Torrent Power on 26 January 2007. This experiment proved to be very successful and a trendsetter in the power distribution sector of the Country. Its later distribution franchisee attempts for Aurangabad Urban I & II Divisions of Aurangabad Urban Circle (M/s GTL Private Limited) and Gandhibag, Civil Lines, and Mahal Divisions of Nagpur Urban Circle (given to M/s Spanco & later M/s Essel group) miserably failed after a few years of operation and MSEDCL has to take over these areas after facing a huge loss of revenue from these two metro cities. The company has appointed distribution franchisees for Malegaon town.

== Zero load shedding model ==
A zero load shedding model is being implemented at certain places with the active participation of local citizens through consumer groups and peoples representatives. The mechanism is extremely transparent and is prior approved by the regulator. In this model, a costly power to the extent of shortfall is arranged for which a reliability charge is levied upon the local consumers. Beginning in Pune, the model was implemented in Navi Mumbai, Thane, Pen and Baramati. MSEDCL itself filed a petition before the MERC for implementing a zero load shedding model at all the headquarters of revenue divisions - Nagpur, Amravati, Navi Mumbai, Pune and Aurangabad. The MERC approved the proposal and the model was implemented at these headquarters from December 2009. MSEDCL has planned to extend it further to district headquarters, taluka headquarters and so on.

== See also ==
- Maharashtra Electricity Regulatory Commission (MERC)
