= Deepnagar =

Deepnagar is located in the northeast part of Butwal city. This location is one of the best residential places in Butwal city. The main attraction of Deepnagar is Hill Park which is one of the most beautiful parks in the city which is located in the north part of Deepnagar. Sombaare Haat Bazar is one of the largest commercial trading venues of local people. Shiddheshori Higher Secondary School is the largest government school of Deepnagar which is located in the centre of the place.

== Attractions ==
- Hillpark
- Nilkanta Babadham: Hindu Temple with cultural importance, also a Sanskrit Ashram.
