= Tillari (Main) Dam =

Tillari Dam
- Location within Maharashtra
- Official name: Tillari (Main) Dam D04937
- Location: Chandgad
- Coordinates: 15.798696°N 74.343281°E
- Opening date: 1986
- Owners: Government of Maharashtra, India

Dam and spillways
- Type of dam: Gravity
- Impounds: Tillari river
- Height: 38.05 m (124.8 ft)
- Length: 485 m (1,591 ft)
- Dam volume: 250 km^{3} (60 cu mi)

Reservoir
- Total capacity: 92,020 km^{3} (22,080 cu mi)
- Surface area: 9,290 km^{2} (3,590 sq mi)

Tillari (Main) Dam is a gravity dam on Tillari river near Chandgad, Kolhapur district in the state of Maharashtra in India.

== Specifications ==
The height of the dam above the lowest foundation is 38.05 m (124.8 ft) while the length is 485 m (1,591 ft). Its volume content is 250 km^{3} (60 cu mi) and its gross storage capacity is 113,266.00 km^{3} (27,173.96 cu mi).

== Purpose ==
- Hydroelectricity power generation

== See also ==
- Dams in Maharashtra
- List of reservoirs and dams in India
