= Solar-powered pump =

Pump that uses solar energy

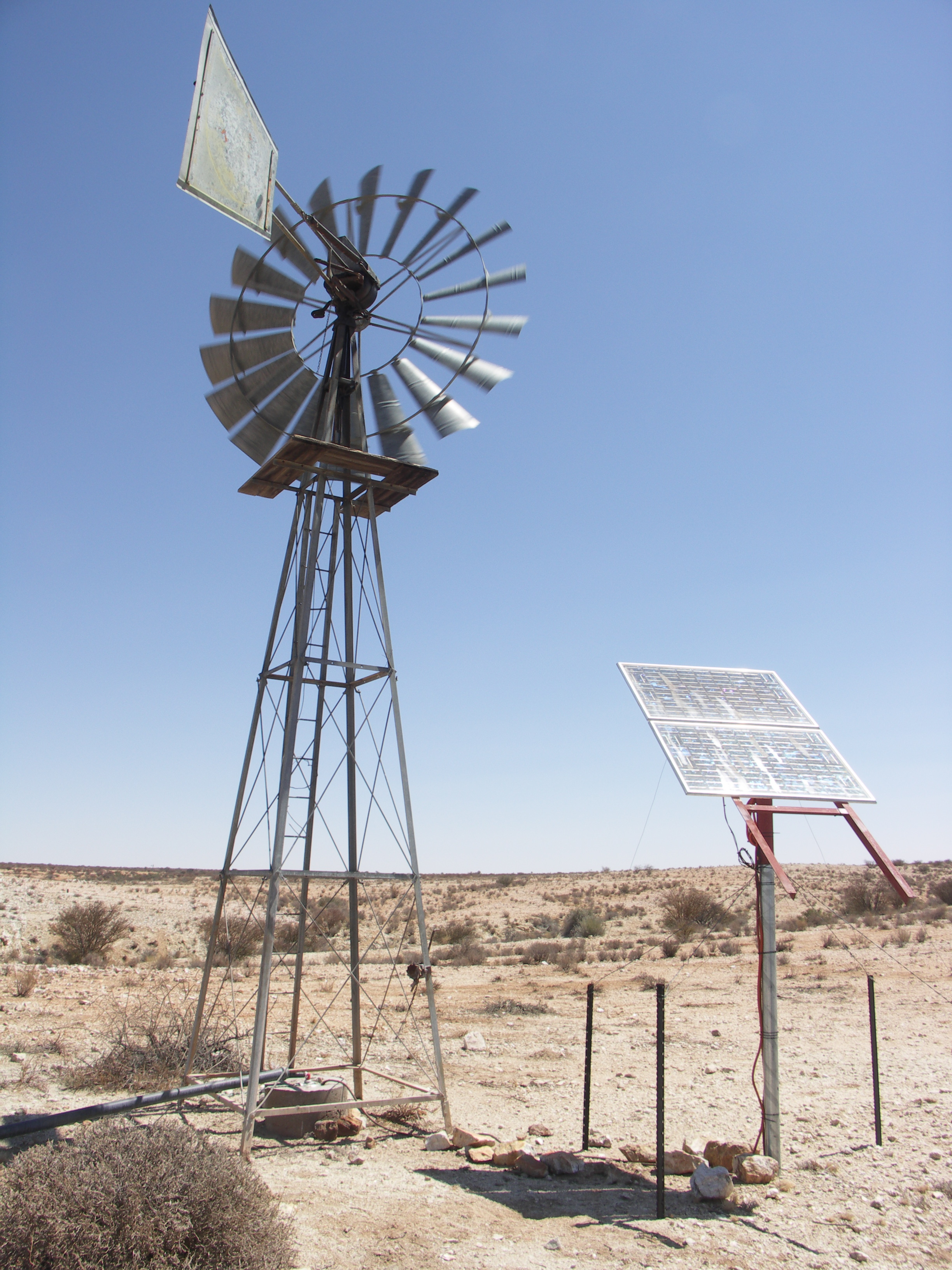
A windpump replaced by a solar-powered pump at a water hole in the Augrabies Falls National Park. (Note: Note that the pumpshaft has been removed from the windpump and it is no longer connected to the borehole; instead, the borehole now contains an electric pump powered by the solar panels.)

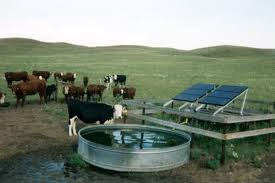
This solar water pump up to 3.7 kW is useful for farmers.

Solar-powered pumps run on electricity generated by photovoltaic (PV) panels or the radiated thermal energy available from collected sunlight as opposed to grid electricity- or diesel-run water pumps. Generally, solar-powered pumps consist of a solar panel array, solar charge controller, DC water pump, fuse box/breakers, electrical wiring, and a water storage tank. The operation of solar-powered pumps is more economical mainly due to the lower operation and maintenance costs and has less environmental impact than pumps powered by an internal combustion engine. Solar pumps are useful where grid electricity is unavailable or impractical, and alternative sources (in particular wind) do not provide sufficient energy.

== Components ==
A PV solar-powered pump system has three main parts - one or more solar panels, a controller, and a pump. The solar panels make up most (up to 80%) of the system's cost. The size of the PV system is directly dependent on the size of the pump, the amount of water that is required, and the solar irradiance available.

The purpose of the controller is twofold. Firstly, it matches the output power that the pump receives with the input power available from the solar panels. Secondly, a controller usually provides a low- or high-voltage protection, whereby the system is switched off, if the voltage is too low or too high for the operating voltage range of the pump. This increases the service life of the pump, thus reducing the need for maintenance. Other ancillary functions include automatically shutting down the system when the water source level is low or when the storage tank is full, regulating water output pressure, blending power input between the solar panels and an alternate power source such as the grid or an engine-powered generator, and remotely monitoring and managing the system through an online portal offered as a cloud service by the manufacturer.

Voltage of the solar pump motors can be alternating current (AC) or direct current (DC). DC motors are used for small to medium applications up to about 4 kW rating, and are suitable for applications such as garden fountains, landscaping, drinking water for livestock, or small irrigation projects. Since DC systems tend to have overall higher efficiency levels than AC pumps of a similar size, the costs are reduced, as smaller solar panels can be used.

Finally, if an AC solar pump is used, an inverter is necessary to change the DC power from the solar panels into AC for the pump. The supported power range of inverters extends from 0.15 to 55 kW, and can be used for larger irrigation systems. The panel and inverters must be sized accordingly, though, to accommodate the inrush characteristic of an AC motor. To aid in proper sizing, leading manufacturers provide proprietary sizing software tested by third-party certifying companies. The sizing software may include the projected monthly water output, which varies due to seasonal change in insolation.

== Water pumping ==
Solar-powered water pumps can deliver drinking water, water for livestock, or irrigation water. Solar water pumps may be especially useful in small-scale or community-based irrigation, as large-scale irrigation requires large volumes of water that in turn require a large solar PV array. As the water may only be required during some parts of the year, a large PV array would provide excess energy that is not necessarily required, thus making the system inefficient, unless an alternative use can be found.

Solar PV water pumping systems are used for irrigation and drinking water in India. Most of the pumps are fitted with a 2.0 - 3.7 kW motor that receives energy from a 4.8 kW_{p} PV array. The 3.7 kW systems can deliver about 124,000 liters of water/day from a total of 50 meters setoff head and 70 meters dynamic head. By 30 August 2016, a total of 120,000 solar PV water pumping systems had been installed around the world. Energy storage in the form of water storage is better than energy storage in the form of batteries for solar water pumps because no intermediary transformation of one form of energy to another is needed. The most common pump mechanics used are centrifugal pumps, multistage pumps, borehole pumps, and helical pumps. Important scientific concepts of fluid dynamics such as pressure vs. head, pump heads, pump curves, system curves, and net suction head are really important for the successful deployment and design of solar-powered pumps.A 2024 life cycle assessment of a 6 MWp solar photovoltaic irrigation system in southern Spain found that the system reduced greenhouse gas emissions by approximately 46% and primary energy consumption by around 50% compared with the reference energy supply scenario. The study also estimated an energy payback period of 3.51 to 3.81 years, highlighting the potential environmental benefits of large-scale solar-powered irrigation.

== Oil and gas ==
To combat negative publicity related to the environmental impacts of fossil fuels, including fracking, the oil and gas industry is embracing solar-powered pumping systems. Many oil and gas wells require the accurate injection (metering) of various chemicals under pressure to sustain their operation and to improve extraction rates. Historically, these chemical injection pumps (CIPs) have been driven by gas reciprocating motors using the pressure of the well's gas, and exhausting the raw gas into the atmosphere. Solar-powered electrical pumps (solar CIPs) can reduce these greenhouse gas emissions. Solar arrays (PV cells) not only provide a sustainable power source for the CIPs, but can also provide an electricity source to run remote SCADA-type diagnostics with remote control and satellite/cell communications from very remote locations to a desktop or notebook monitoring computer.

== Stirling engine ==
Instead of generating electricity to turn a motor, sunlight can be concentrated on the heat exchanger of a Stirling engine and used to drive a pump mechanically. This dispenses with the cost of solar panels and electric equipment. In some cases, the Stirling engine may be suitable for local fabrication, eliminating the difficulty of importing equipment. One form of Stirling engine is the fluidyne engine, which operates directly on the pumped fluid as a piston. Fluidyne solar pumps have been studied since 1987. At least one manufacturer has conducted tests with a Stirling solar-powered pump.

== See also ==
- List of solar powered products
- List of photovoltaic power stations
