= Maharashtra State Power Generation Company =

Wholly owned subsidiary of Maharashtra State Electricity Board (MSEB)

Maharashtra State Power Generation Company Limited
- Company type: subsidiary of Maharashtra State Electricity Board
- Industry: Electricity Generation
- Founded: 6 June 2005 (As MSEB was trifurcated)
- Headquarters: Bandra, Mumbai, India
- Area served: Maharashtra
- Key people: Shri Devendra Fadnavis, Minister of Energy, Chairman; Dr. P. Anbalagan, IAS Managing Director
- Products: Electricity
- Revenue: Approx ₹7,400 crore
- Number of employees: 15,000
- Parent: Maharashtra State Electricity Board
- Website: Official Website

The Mahanirmiti or Mahagenco (Maharashtra State Power Generation plants Limited - MSPGCL) formerly known as MSEB (Maharashtra State Electricity Board) is a major power generating plants in the state of Maharashtra, India and a wholly owned subsidiary of Maharashtra State Electricity Board. With a total generation of 14,400 MW, it is the largest power producing plants in India controlled by state government. The power generated by Mahagenco is supplied to Maharashtra. It was a part of Maharashtra State Electricity Board until 6 June 2005.

It has been incorporated under Companies Act, 1956 pursuant to decision of government of Maharashtra to reorganise erstwhile history of Maharashtra State Electricity Board. Mahagenco has been incorporated in June 2005.

== About Mahagenco ==
Mahagenco has the highest overall generation capacity and the highest thermal installed capacity amongst state-owned power generation utilities in India. In terms of installed capacity, it ranks second after National Thermal Power Corporation Limited. The company operates a generation portfolio that includes thermal, hydroelectric, gas-based, and solar power plants. The first 500 MW generating unit installed by a state utility in India was commissioned in Maharastra.

== Power stations operated by Mahagenco ==
=== Thermal power stations, coal-based ===
Operational

1. Chandrapur Super Thermal Power Station - 2920 MW.
2. Koradi Thermal Power Station - 3660 MW
3. Khaparkheda Thermal Power Station - 1340 MW
4. Bhusawal Thermal Power Station - 1420 MW
5. Nashik Thermal Power Station - 630 MW
6. Parli Thermal Power station - 750 MW
7. Paras Thermal Power Station, Akola - 500 MW
8. RattanIndia Amravati Thermal Power Project, Amravati - 10×270 MW = 2700 MW

Planned / under development

1. Chandrapur Super Thermal Power Station Project U-8,9 - 2 × 500 MW
2. Koradi Thermal Power Station Project U-8,9,10 - 3 × 660 MW
3. Bhusawal Thermal Power Station Project U-6 - 1 × 660 MW

=== Thermal power stations, gas-based ===
1. Uran Gas Turbine Power Station - 4 X 108, 2 X 120 = 672 MW

=== Hydro power stations ===
1. Bhatghar- Dam
2. Bhatsa
3. Bhira - 80 MW
4. Dimbhe Dam
5. Ghatghar Pumped Storage Hydroelectric Power Plant - 250 MW
6. Kanher Dam
7. Koyna Hydroelectric Project - 1,956 MW
8. Manikdoh Dam
9. Panshet Dam
10. Pavana Dam
11. Surya Dam
12. Tillari Dam, Chandgad
13. Ujjani Dam
14. Lower Vaitarna Dam
15. Varasgaon Dam
16. Veer Dam
17. Warna Dam
18. Yeldari Dam

== See also ==
- Maharashtra Electricity Regulatory Commission
- Make in Maharashtra
