= Bhusawal =

Small city in Jalgaon district, Maharashtra, India

Bhusawal Bhusaval
- City
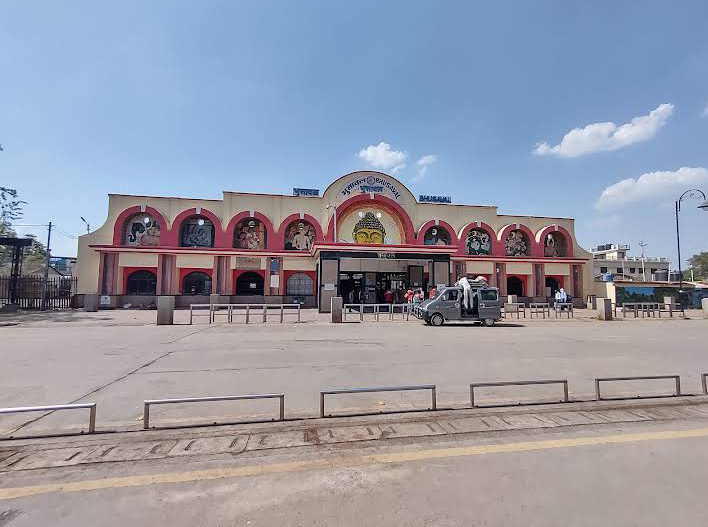
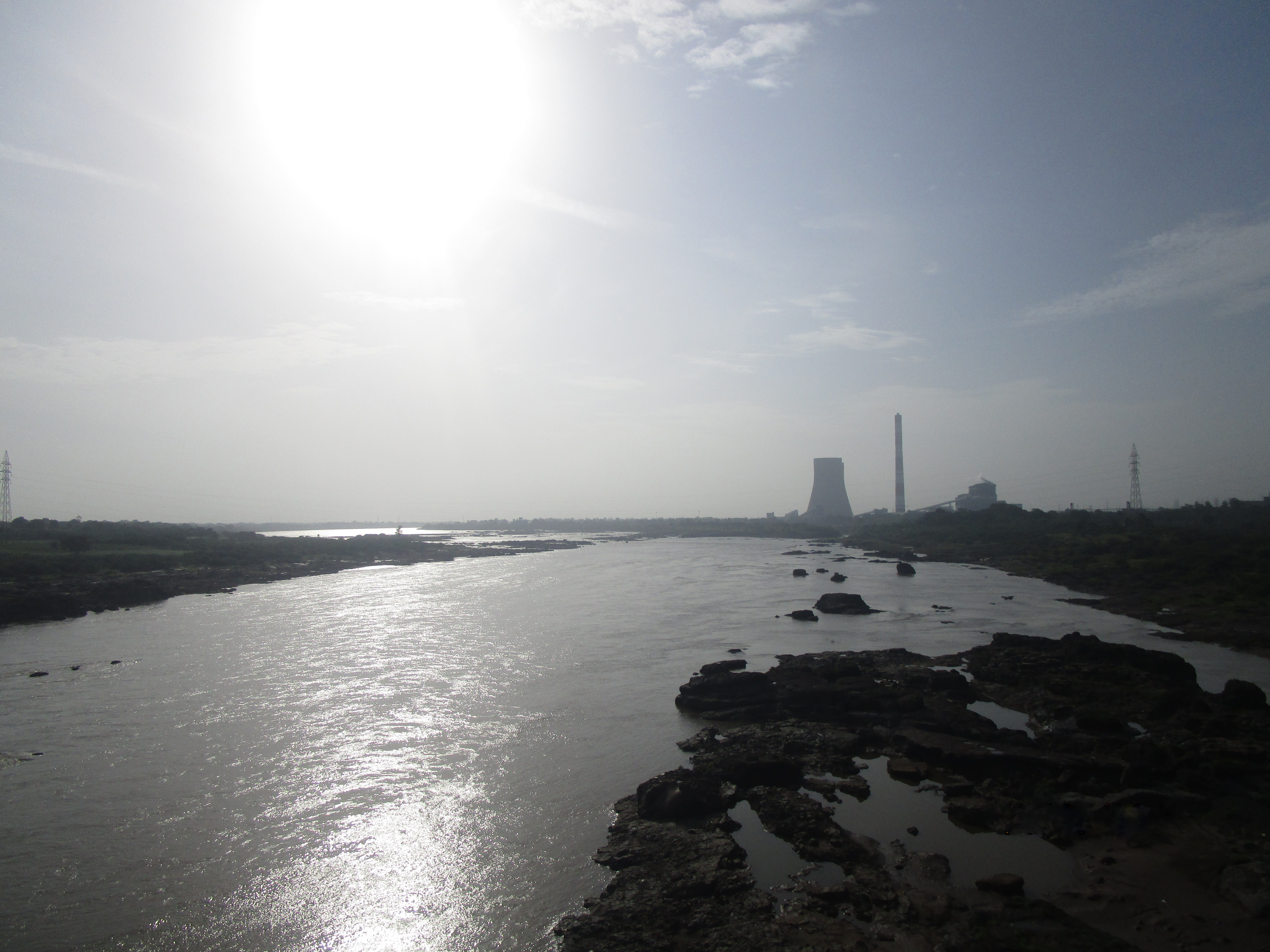
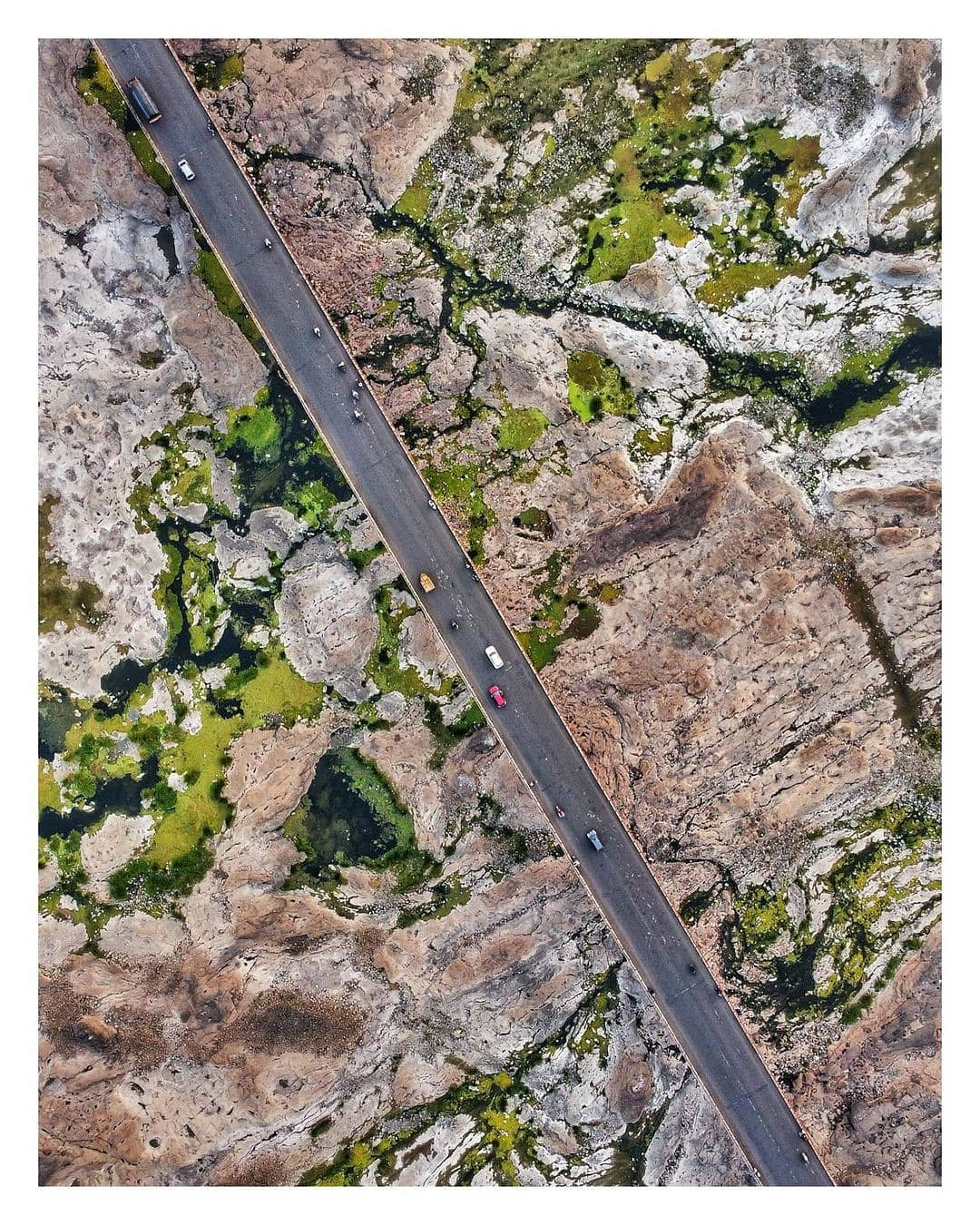
- Clockwise - Bhusawal Junction, Tapi river and bridge, Bhusawal Thermal Station

- Location in Maharashtra, India Bhusawal (India)
- Coordinates: 21.05°N 75.77°E
- Country: India
- State: Maharashtra
- District: Jalgaon
- Established: 1882

Government
  - Type: Municipal Council
  - Body: Bhusawal Municipal Council
  - Mayor: Gayatri Bhangale

Area
  - Total: 13.38 km^{2} (5.17 sq mi)
- Elevation: 209 m (686 ft)

Population (2011)
  - Total: 187,421
  - Density: 14,010/km^{2} (36,280/sq mi)
- Demonym: Bhusawalkar

Language
  - Official: Marathi
- Time zone: UTC+5:30 (IST)
- Postal Index Number: 425201
- Area code: 00-91-02582
- Vehicle registration: MH-19

Bhusawal (Note: It is also written as Bhusaval.) is a city in the Jalgaon district of Maharashtra, India. Situated along the Tapti River, it lies between the Satpura Range and the Ajanta Hills of the Deccan plateau. The city is a significant hub for the Central Railway, featuring the largest railway junction in Maharashtra and the second-largest railway yard in Asia. Bhusawal also has one of the largest Municipal Councils. It serves as a vital commercial center for the surrounding cotton-growing region and is involved in the trade of bananas, millet, and peanuts (groundnuts). The city features a substantial oil-processing industry and is the second-largest city in the Jalgaon district after Jalgaon.

The Bhusaval Junction railway station is one of the busiest railway stations in the nation and serves as the headquarters of the Bhusawal railway division. The railway line and station were constructed in the second half of the 19th century by the British government.

== History ==
On 19–23 February 1993, the city hosted its only first-class cricket match to date during the 1992–93 Ranji Trophy season at the Central Railway Ground. Maharashtra's SV Jedhe scored a century (168) in the first innings and 64 in the second innings. The home team Maharashtra defeated the Tamil Nadu cricket team by 10 wickets. In the game, 1983 World Cup-winning team member Krishnamachari Srikkanth played for Tamil Nadu.

== Geography and climate ==
Bhusawal is situated on the banks of the Tapti river. It has an average elevation of 209 metres. The total land area of the municipal council is 228.57 km^{2}. Bounded by mountain ranges, Bhusawal has a diverse climate, though the weather is hot and dry for most of the year. During summer, temperatures reach 46 to 49 °C, among the highest in India. In 2010, the temperature reached a record 49.8 °C. In winter, temperatures fall to 15 to 16 °C. The city receives moderate rainfall during the monsoon season.

== Demographics ==
The estimated population of Bhusawal city in 2023 is around 271,000, with the Bhusawal metropolitan area estimated at 295,000. The last official census in 2011 recorded a population of 187,421. The 2021 census was postponed due to the COVID-19 pandemic, so the current figures are based on growth rate estimations. The literacy rate is 88.38 % (91.74 % for males and 84.87 % for females). Hinduism is the majority religion, practiced by 64.06 % of the population, followed by Islam (24.40 %) and Buddhism (8.79 %).

Year	Male	Female	Total Population	Change	Religion (%)							
Year	Male	Female	Total Population	Change	Hindu	Muslim	Christian	Sikhs	Buddhist	Jain	Other religions and persuasions	Religion not stated
2001	89,208	83,164	172,372	-	66.360	21.832	1.328	0.450	8.612	1.162	0.249	0.008
2011	96,147	91,274	187,421	0.087	64.056	24.405	1.079	0.411	8.786	0.951	0.097	0.215

== Transport ==
The Ajanta Caves are about 63 km (via Jamner) from Bhusawal.

=== Road ===
Bhusawal is situated near National Highway 53 (NH 53). Because it is an old city, its narrow roads frequently result in slow traffic movement.

=== Rail ===
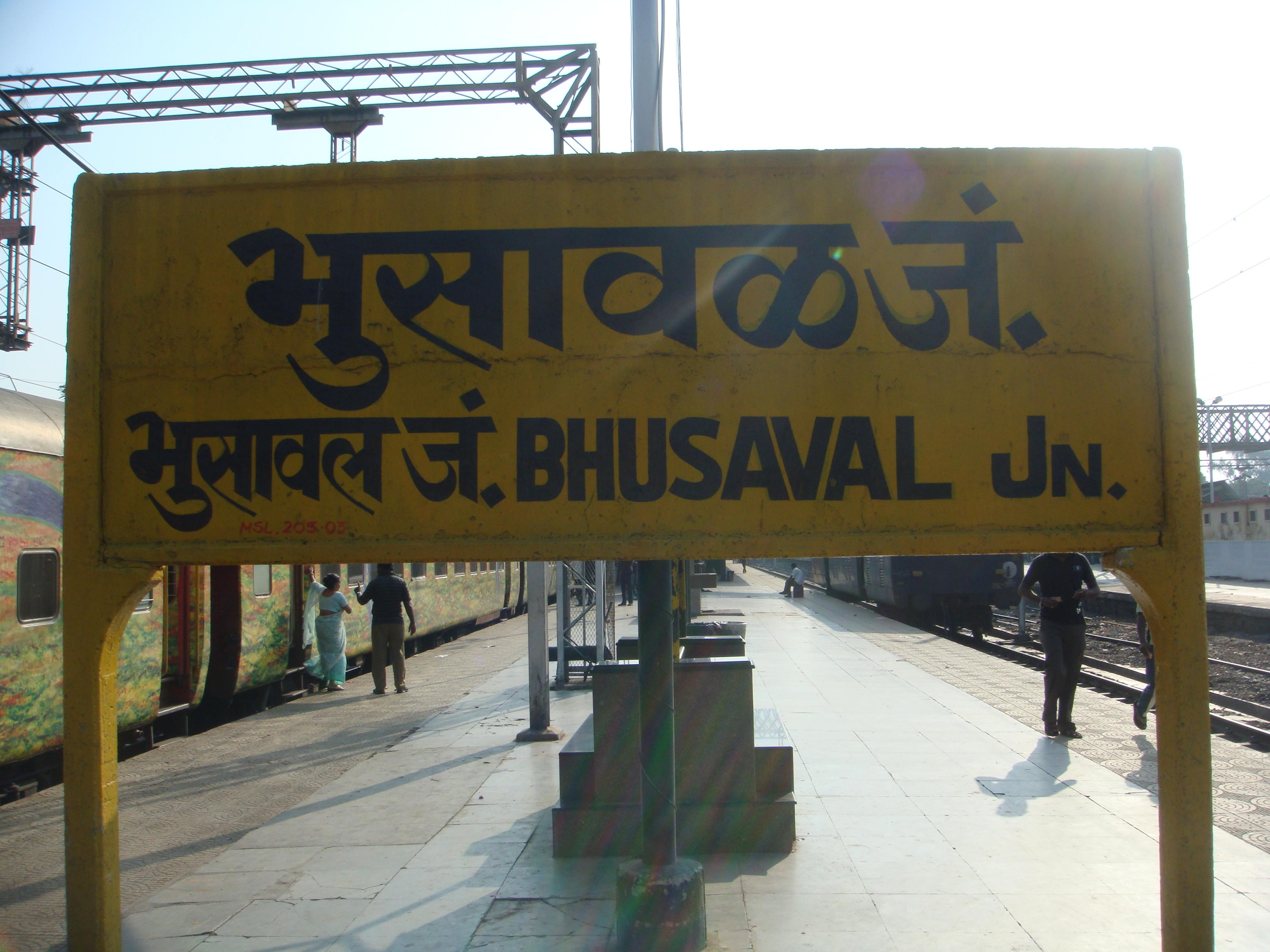
Bhusawal Railway Station

Bhusawal Junction Railway Station is a divisional headquarters of the Central Railways. It is on both the Howrah–Allahabad–Mumbai line and the Howrah–Nagpur–Mumbai line. The Bhusawal Railway Yard is the second largest railway yard in Asia, after the Pandit Din Dayal Upadhyay Junction Railway Yard, Mughalsarai. Bhusawal is the closest junction to Ajanta (83 km away).

=== Air ===
Jalgaon Airport is the closest airport to Bhusawal.

== Economy ==
A railway coach factory is planned for the city. Bhusawal hosts two ordnance factories, out of the 41 such facilities in India. Bhusawal has a major military base as well. The city has five thermal power station units, four of which are operational, with a combined capacity of over 1,420 MW. This makes Bhusawal a major contributor to the state's overall electricity generation, providing over 12 % of Maharashtra's total power output. A proposed sixth unit of 660 MW would increase the city's power output to over 2,000 MW.

Major industrial facilities include:

- Bhusawal Thermal Power Station (7 km)
- Ordnance Factory Bhusawal (8.3 km)
- Ordnance Factory Varangaon
- Orient Cement Grinding Unit (12 km)
- Indian Oil Corporation Limited Depot (15 km)
- Railway's Zonal Training School
- Electric Locomotive Workshop Bhusawal

Bhusawal is a major exporter of bananas and is widely known for its cultivation of the fruit; the Jalgaon district accounts for more than 40 % of the state's banana production. Traders frequently visit Bhusawal to purchase raw bananas. The city is also known for its special white brinjals (eggplants).

== See also ==
- Bhusawal Junction railway station
- Bhusawal Railway Division
- Bhusawal Thermal Power Station
- Bhusawal (Vidhan Sabha constituency)
