= Maharashtra State Electricity Board =

State electricity regulation board operating within the state of Maharashtra

Maharashtra State Electricity Board महाराष्ट्र राज्य विद्युत मंडळ
- Company type: State Government Electricity Board
- Industry: Electricity Generation, Electricity Transmission, Electricity Distribution
- Founded: 20 June 1960
- Headquarters: Mumbai, Maharashtra, India
- Area served: Maharashtra
- Products: Electricity
- Parent: Ministry of Energy, New and Renewable Energy, Government Of Maharashtra
- Divisions: Maharashtra State Electricity Distribution Company Limited; Maharashtra State Power Generation Company Limited; Maharashtra State Electricity Transmission Company
- Website: www.msebindia.com

Maharashtra State Electricity Board (or MSEB) (Marathi:महाराष्ट्र राज्य विद्युत मंडळ) is a state government electricity regulation board operating within the state of Maharashtra in India. The MSEB was formed on 20 June 1960 under Section 5 of the Electricity (Supply) Act, 1948. In 1998 it was the second largest electricity generating utility in India after National Thermal Power Corporation.

== History ==
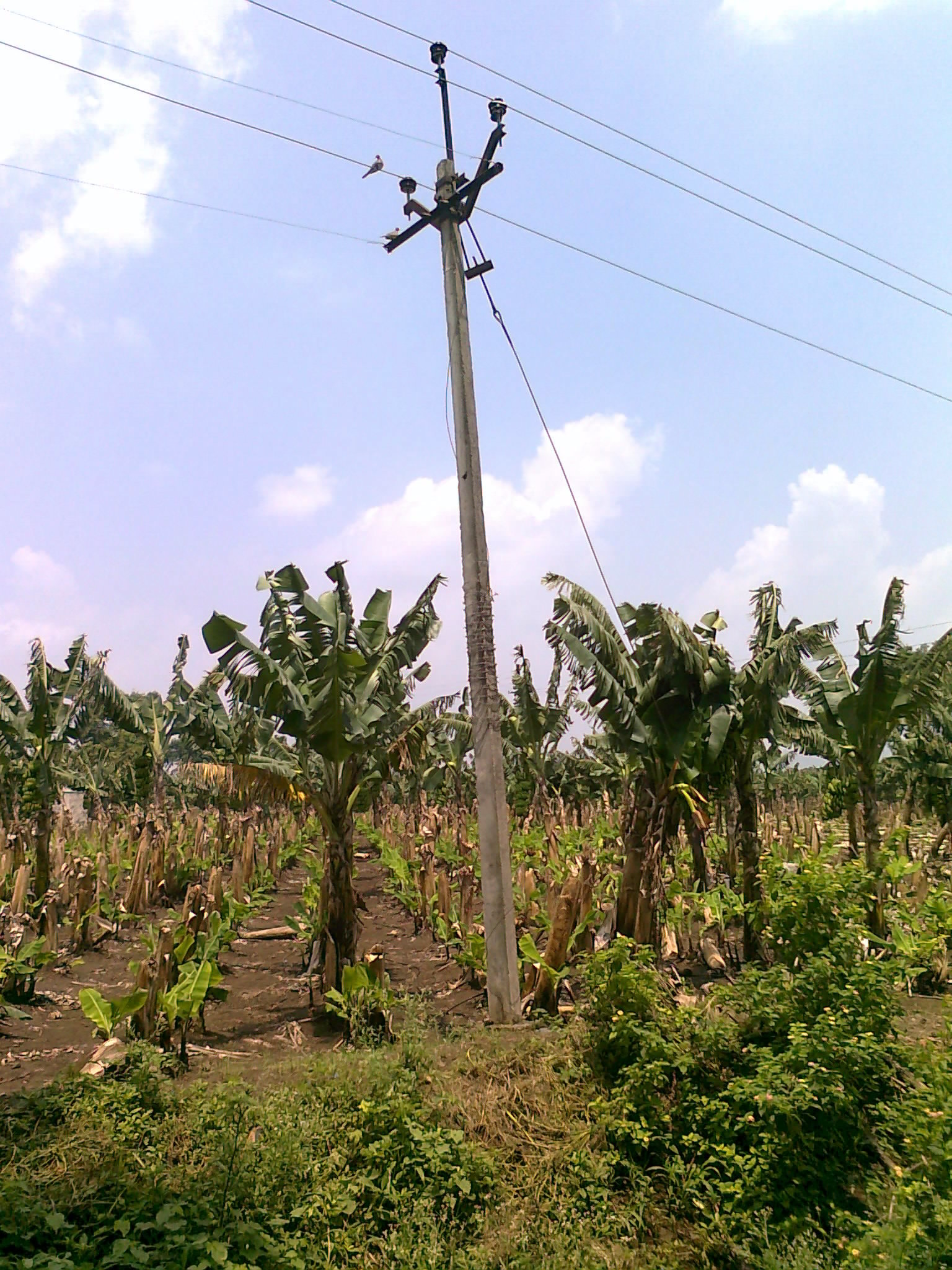
MSEB power line in farms at Chinawal village in Jalgaon district

The company's predecessor was the Bombay Electricity Board which was formed on 6 November 1954 and operated up to 31 March 1957 when it was renamed to Maharashtra State Electricity Board which operated until 19 June 1960. The result of a collaboration between the MSEB and Enron was the Ratnagiri power plant.

=== Restructuring ===
In accordance with Electricity Act 2003 of the Government of India, the Maharashtra State Electricity Board was restructured into 4 companies in 2005. These companies were registered with Company Registrar in Mumbai on 31 May 2005 as follows:

- MSEB Holding Company Limited.
- Maharashtra State Power Generation Company Limited, Mahanirmiti or Mahagenco, MSPGCL.
- Maharashtra State Electricity Transmission Company Limited, Mahapareshan or Mahatransco, MSETCL.
- Maharashtra State Electricity Distribution Company Limited, Mahavitaran or Mahadiscom, MSEDCL.

Mahavitaran−MSEDCL is responsible for distribution of electricity throughout the state by buying power from either Mahanirmiti−MSPGCL power plants, or from other state electricity boards and private sector power generation companies.

The holding company entity, MSEB Holding Company Limited, holds all the stake in the other three companies. All these 3 companies are engineers dominated.

== Capacity and non-renewable resources ==
Maharashtra constitutes 13% of the total installed electricity generation capacity in India, which is mainly produced from non-renewable resources, using fossil fuels such as coal and natural gas.
