= Jaiprakash Nagar metro station =

Nagpur Metro's Orange Line metro station

Jaiprakash Nagar
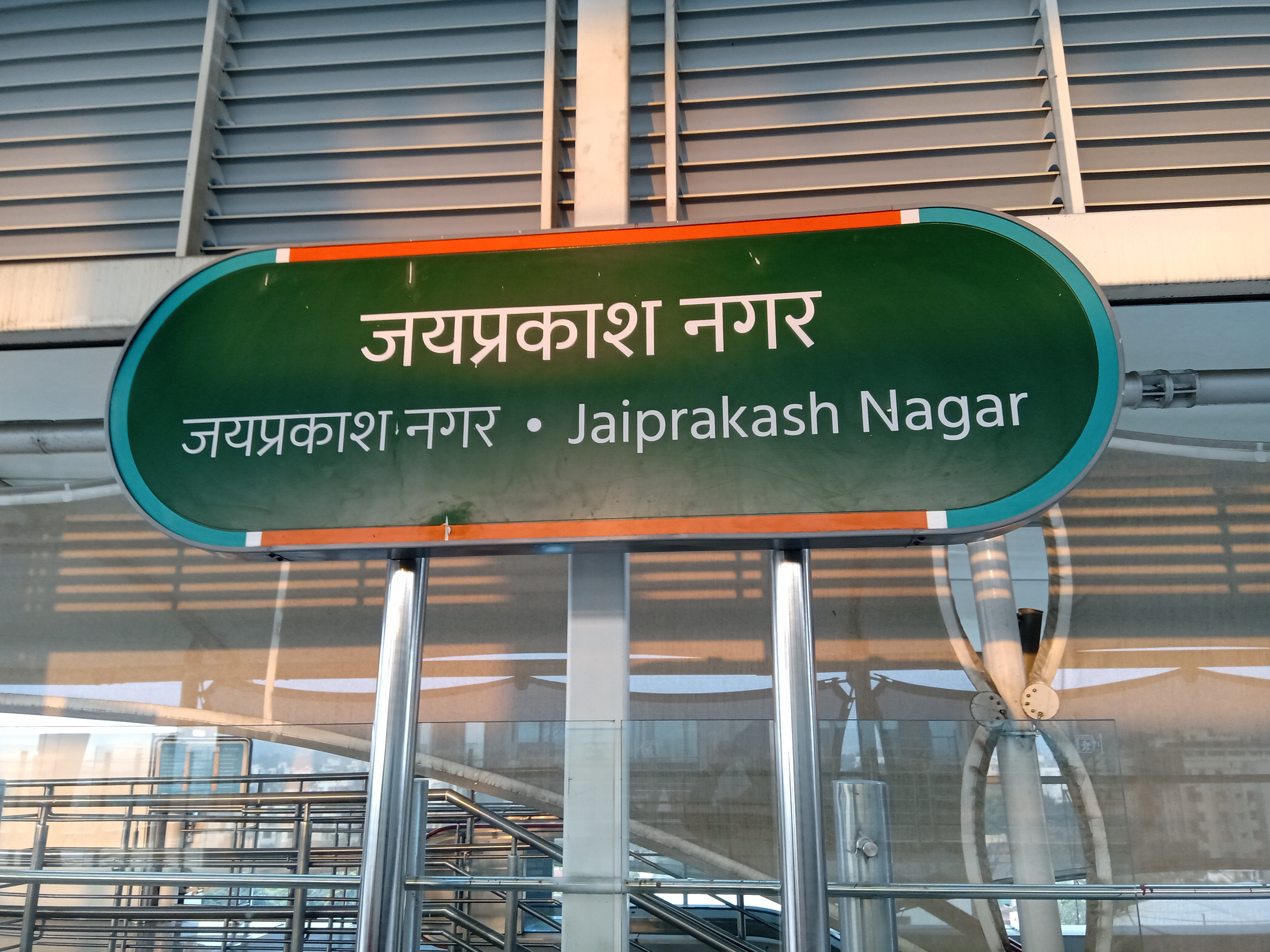

General information
- Location: Somalwada, Nagpur, Maharashtra 440025
- Coordinates: 21.10362°N 79.06816°E
- System: Nagpur Metro station
- Owner: Maharashtra Metro Rail Corporation Limited (MAHA-METRO)
- Operator: Nagpur Metro
- Line: Orange Line
- Platforms: Side platform Platform-1 → Automotive Square; Platform-2 → Khapri
- Tracks: 2

Construction
- Structure type: Elevated, Double track
- Platform levels: 2
- Accessible: Yes

History
- Opened: 20 November 2019; 6 years ago
- Electrified: 25 kV 50 Hz AC overhead catenary

Services
Preceding station	Nagpur Metro	Following station
Chhatrapati Square towards Automotive Square	Orange Line	Ujjwal Nagar towards Khapri
Route map
Location

Jaiprakash Nagar is an elevated metro station on the North-South corridor of the Orange Line of Nagpur Metro in the city of Nagpur, Maharashtra. This serves the Jaiprakash Nagar area of Nagpur. It was opened on 20 November 2019.

== Station layout ==
G	Street level	Exit/Entrance
L1	Mezzanine	Fare control, station agent, Metro Card vending machines, crossover
L2	Side platform | Doors will open on the left
L2	Platform 2 Southbound	Towards → Khapri; Next Station: Ujjwal Nagar
L2	Platform 1 Northbound	Towards ← Automotive Square; Next Station: Chhatrapati Square
L2	Side platform | Doors will open on the left
L2

== See also ==
- Nagpur
- Maharashtra
- List of Nagpur Metro stations
- Rapid transit in India
