= Chhatrapati Square metro station =

Nagpur Metro station in Maharashtra, India

Chhatrapati Square
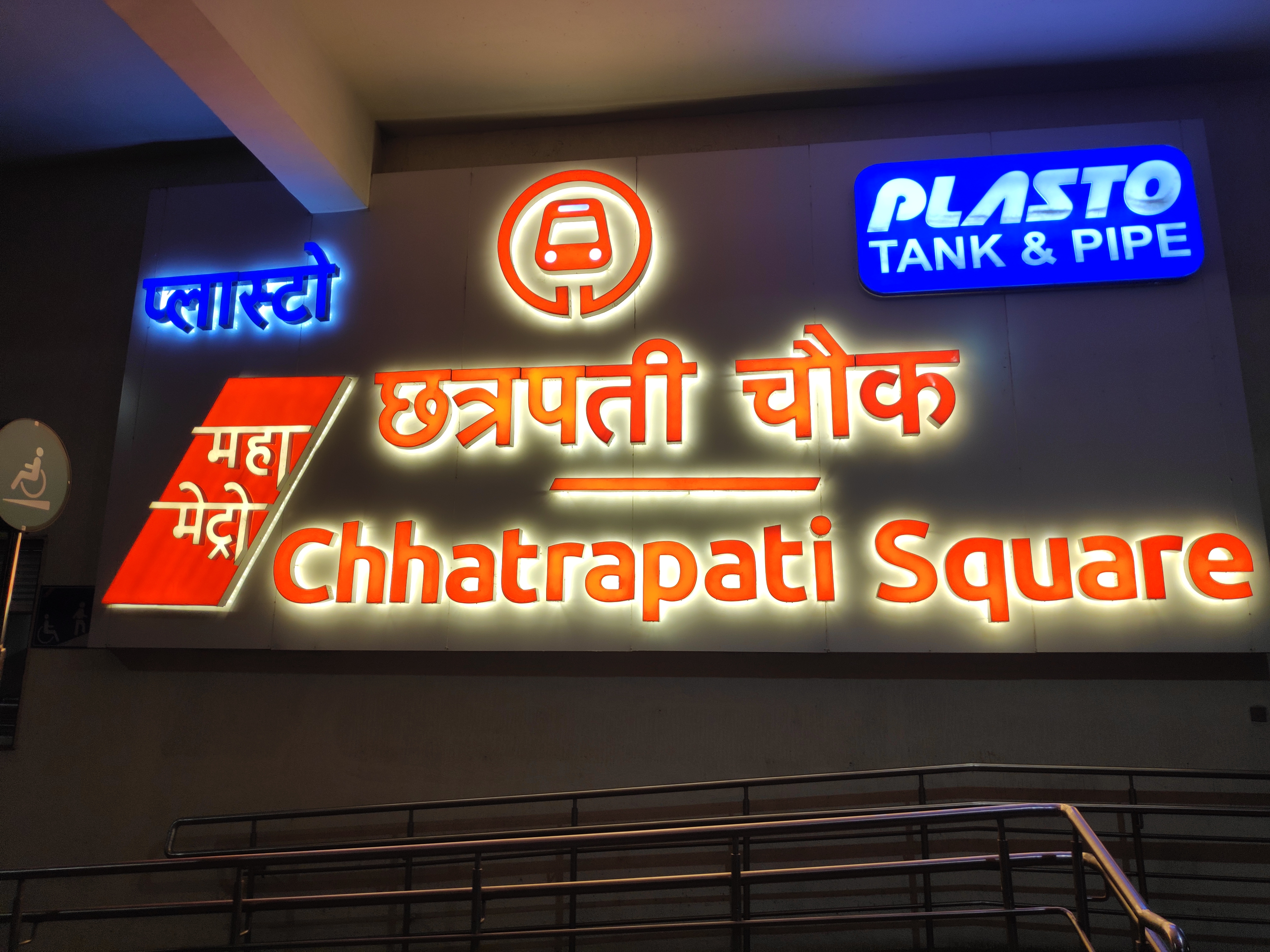

General information
- Location: New Sneh Nagar, Nagpur, Maharashtra 440015
- Coordinates: 21.10915°N 79.06965°E
- System: Nagpur Metro station
- Owner: Maharashtra Metro Rail Corporation Limited (MAHA-METRO)
- Operator: Nagpur Metro
- Line: Orange Line
- Platforms: Side platform Platform-1 → Automotive Square; Platform-2 → Khapri
- Tracks: 2

Construction
- Structure type: Elevated, Double track
- Platform levels: 2
- Accessible: Yes

History
- Opened: 6 April 2021; 5 years ago
- Electrified: 25 kV 50 Hz AC overhead catenary

Services
Preceding station	Nagpur Metro	Following station
Ajni Square towards Automotive Square	Orange Line	Jaiprakash Nagar towards Khapri
Route map
Location

Chhatrapati Square is an elevated metro station on the North-South corridor of the Orange Line of Nagpur Metro in the city of Nagpur, Maharashtra. This serves the Chhatrapati Nagar, Narendra Nagar, and Sneh Nagar areas of Nagpur. It was opened on 6 April 2021.

The station covers an area of 12,568 square meters. It is located adjacent to a bus station.

== Station layout ==
G	Street level	Exit/Entrance
L1	Mezzanine	Fare control, station agent, Metro Card vending machines, crossover
L2	Side platform | Doors will open on the left
L2	Platform 2 Southbound	Towards → Khapri; Next Station: Jaiprakash Nagar
L2	Platform 1 Northbound	Towards ← Automotive Square; Next Station: Ajni Square
L2	Side platform | Doors will open on the left
L2

== See also ==
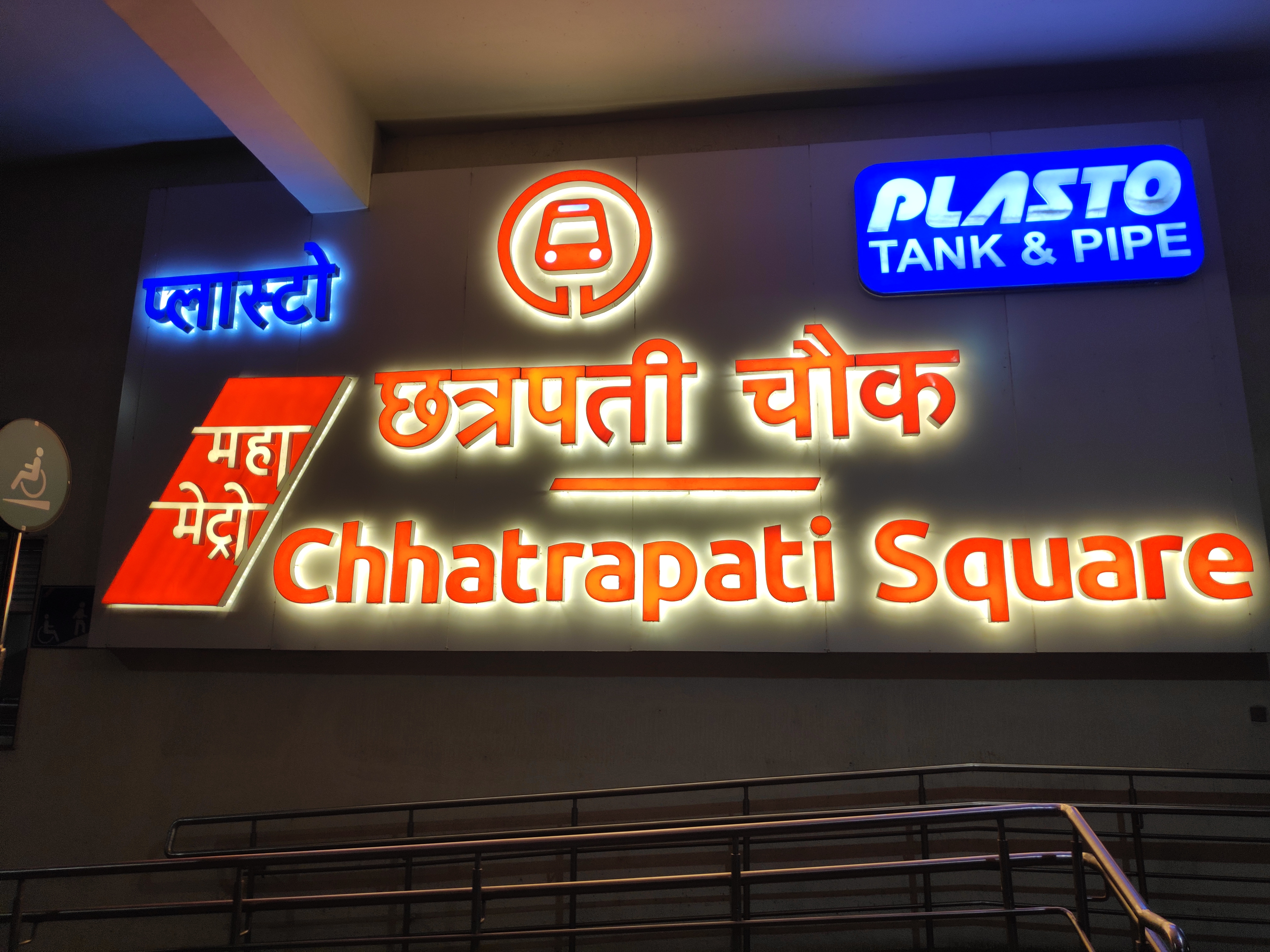

- Nagpur
- Maharashtra
- List of Nagpur Metro stations
- Rapid transit in India
