= Indora Square metro station =

Nagpur Metro's Orange Line metro station

Indora Square

General information
- Location: Kamptee Rd, New Indora, Nagpur, Maharashtra 440002
- Coordinates: 21.17349°N 79.10056°E
- System: Nagpur Metro station
- Owner: Maharashtra Metro Rail Corporation Limited (MAHA-METRO)
- Operator: Nagpur Metro
- Line: Orange Line
- Platforms: Side platform Platform-1 → Automative Square; Platform-2 → Khapri
- Tracks: 2

Construction
- Structure type: Elevated, Double track
- Platform levels: 2
- Accessible: Yes

Other information
- Status: Operational

History
- Opening: 12 December 2022; 3 years ago
- Electrified: 750 V DC third rail

Services
Preceding station	Nagpur Metro	Following station
Nari Road towards Automotive Square	Orange Line	Kadvi Square towards Khapri
Route map
Location

Indora Square is an elevated metro station on the North-South Corridor of the Orange Line of Nagpur Metro in Nagpur, India. This metro station was inaugurated on 11 December 2022 by Prime Minister Narendra Modi and was opened to the public on 12 December 2022.

== Station layout ==
G	Street level	Exit/Entrance
L1	Mezzanine	Fare control, station agent, Metro Card vending machines, crossover
L2	Side platform | Doors will open on the left
L2	Platform 2 Southbound	Towards → Khapri; Next Station: Kadvi Square
L2	Platform 1 Northbound	Towards ← Automotive Square; Next Station: Nari Road
L2	Side platform | Doors will open on the left
L2

== See also ==
- Nagpur
- Maharashtra
- List of Nagpur Metro stations
- Rapid transit in India
