= Ajni railway station =

Railway Station in Maharashtra, India

Ajni
- Indian Railways logo

General information
- Location: Humpyard Road, Ajni, Nagpur, Pin-440003, Maharashtra, India
- Coordinates: 21°07′37″N 79°04′58″E
- Elevation: 304.290 metres (998.33 ft)
- System: Indian Railways station
- Owner: Indian Railways
- Operator: Central Railways
- Platforms: 3 + 4(under construction)
- Tracks: 6

Construction
- Structure type: Standard (on-ground station)
- Parking: Available

Other information
- Status: Functioning
- Station code: AJNI
- Zone(s): Central Railway zone
- Division(s): Nagpur CR

Passengers
- 18000

Services
Preceding station	Indian Railways	Following station
Khapri towards ?	Central Railway zone	Nagpur Junction towards ?
Preceding station	Nagpur Metro	Following station
Sitabuldi towards Automative Square	Orange Line transfer at Congress Nagar	Rahate Colony towards Khapri
Location
- Location within Maharashtra Location within India

Ajni railway station (station code:- AJNI) is a railway station in vicinity of Nagpur in Maharashtra on Delhi–Chennai line.

It is situated at a distance of about 2.8 km from Nagpur railway station. There are plans to develop it as a terminus alternative to Nagpur. A proposal has also been sent to Railway Ministry to develop it as a Coaching complex.

Many trains have a brief stop of about 2 minutes at this station. This station is mainly used by residents of Central, West, South-West and Southern suburbs of Nagpur and short-distance daily travelers. Trains terminating at Nagpur get almost 80 percent emptied here. And trains originating from Nagpur get filled here with almost 40 percent.

Ajni is among the five small stations which falls within the extended city limits of Nagpur. The name of these five stations are Ajni, Itwari, Kalamna, Kamptee & Khapri.

In the past (until the mid to late 1990s), Ajni had the station code of AQ.

== Loco Shed ==
The Electric Loco Shed, Ajni currently holds over 260 locomotives, including 66 WAP-7, 49 WAG-7, 160+ WAG-9 and 26 WAG-12 locomotives.

== Service ==
- Lokmanya Tilak Terminus–Ajni Express
- Pune–Ajni AC Superfast Express
- Amravati–Ajni Intercity Express
- Ajni–Kazipet Passenger

== Gallery ==
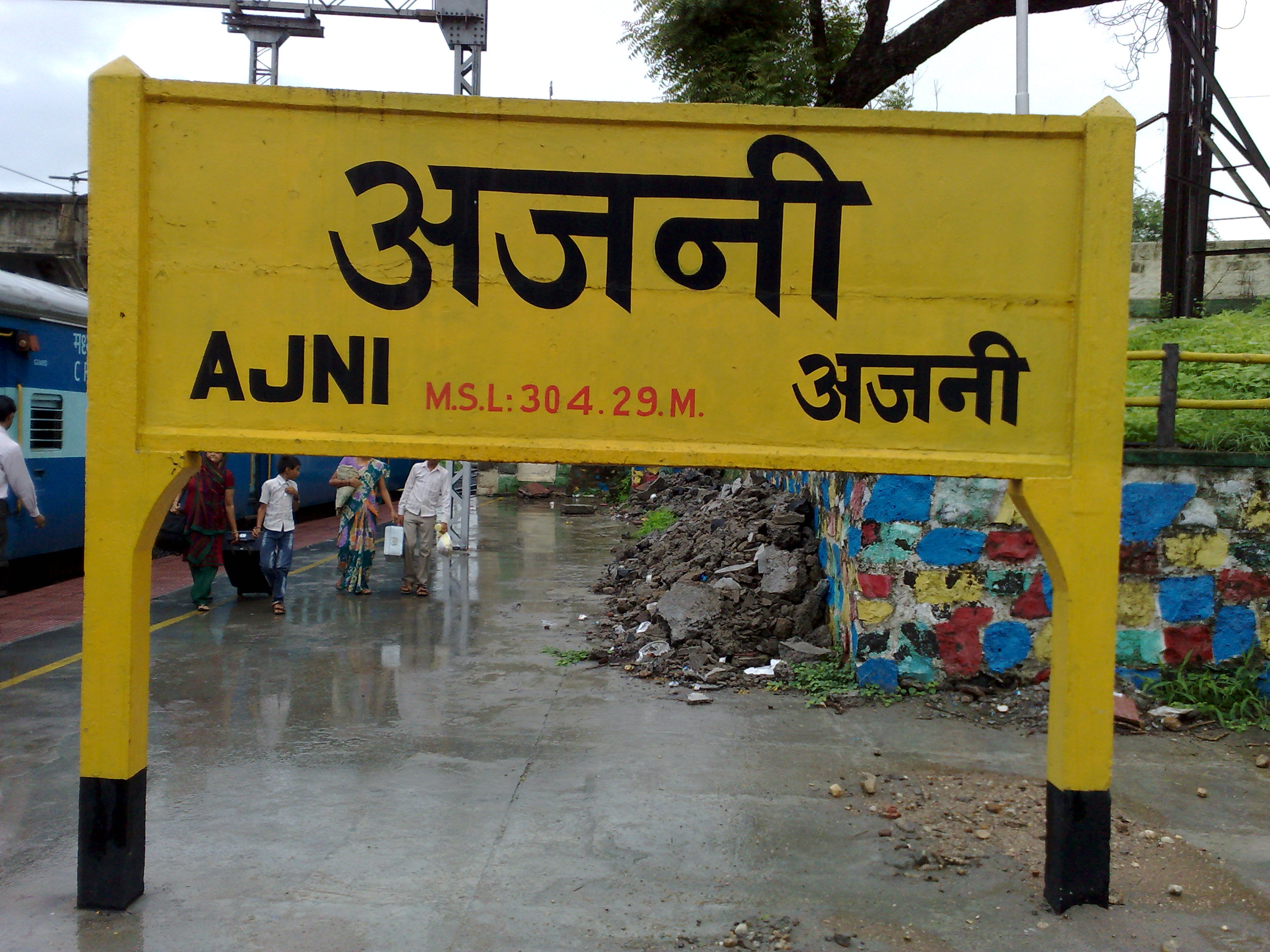
Ajni station board
