= Ujjwal Nagar metro station =

Nagpur Metro's Orange Line metro station

Ujjwal Nagar
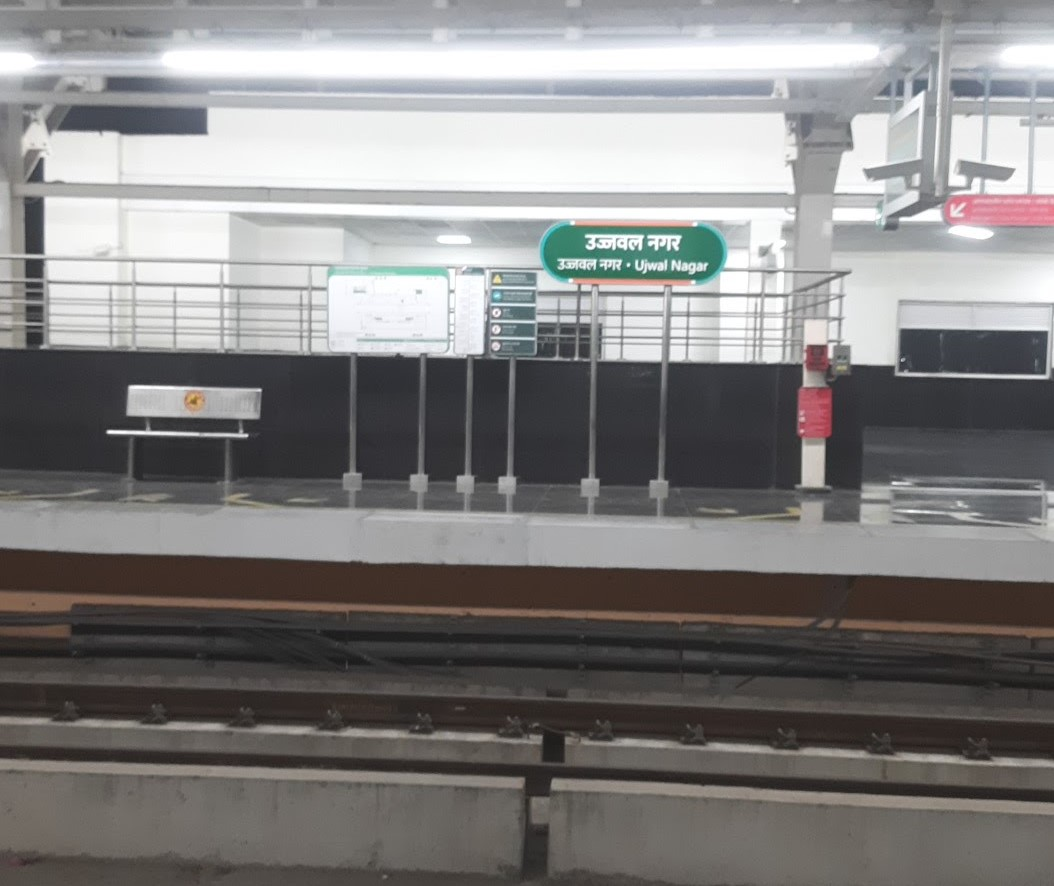

General information
- Location: Sonegaon, Nagpur, Maharashtra 440025
- Coordinates: 21.09652°N 79.06641°E
- System: Nagpur Metro station
- Owner: Maharashtra Metro Rail Corporation Limited (MAHA-METRO)
- Operator: Nagpur Metro
- Line: Orange Line
- Platforms: Side platform Platform-1 → Automotive Square; Platform-2 → Khapri
- Tracks: 2

Construction
- Structure type: Elevated, Double track
- Platform levels: 2
- Accessible: Yes

History
- Opened: 6 April 2021; 5 years ago
- Electrified: 25 kV 50 Hz AC overhead catenary

Services
| Preceding station | Nagpur Metro | Following station |
|---|---|---|
| Jaiprakash Nagar towards Automotive Square | Orange Line | Airport towards Khapri |
Route map
Location

Ujjwal Nagar is an elevated metro station on the North-South corridor of the Orange Line of Nagpur Metro in the city of Nagpur, Maharashtra. This serves the Manish Nagar, Besa, and Beltarodi areas of Nagpur. It was opened on 6 April 2021. It is also known as Somalwada Metro Station.

The Metro Station has two entries and exits, the east one opens near Bajaj Motors, while the West one opens near Kabit Kinder Garden.

The station covers an area of 8,800 square meters.

== Accessibility and connectivity ==
Ujjwal Nagar Metro station serves are a good stop for nearby areas like Manish Nagar, New Manish Nagar, Besa & Beltarodi.

Getting as autoriksha is more easy from east exit of metro station, near Bajaj Motors.

== Station layout ==
| G | Street level | Exit/Entrance |
| L1 | Mezzanine | Fare control, station agent, Metro Card vending machines, crossover |
| L2 | Side platform | Doors will open on the left |
| L2 | Platform 2 Southbound | Towards → Khapri; Next Station: Airport |
| L2 | Platform 1 Northbound | Towards ← Automotive Square; Next Station: Jaiprakash Nagar |
| L2 | Side platform | Doors will open on the left |
| L2 |

== See also ==
- Nagpur
- Maharashtra
- List of Nagpur Metro stations
- Rapid transit in India
