= Airport metro station (Nagpur) =

Nagpur Metro's Orange Line metro station

Airport
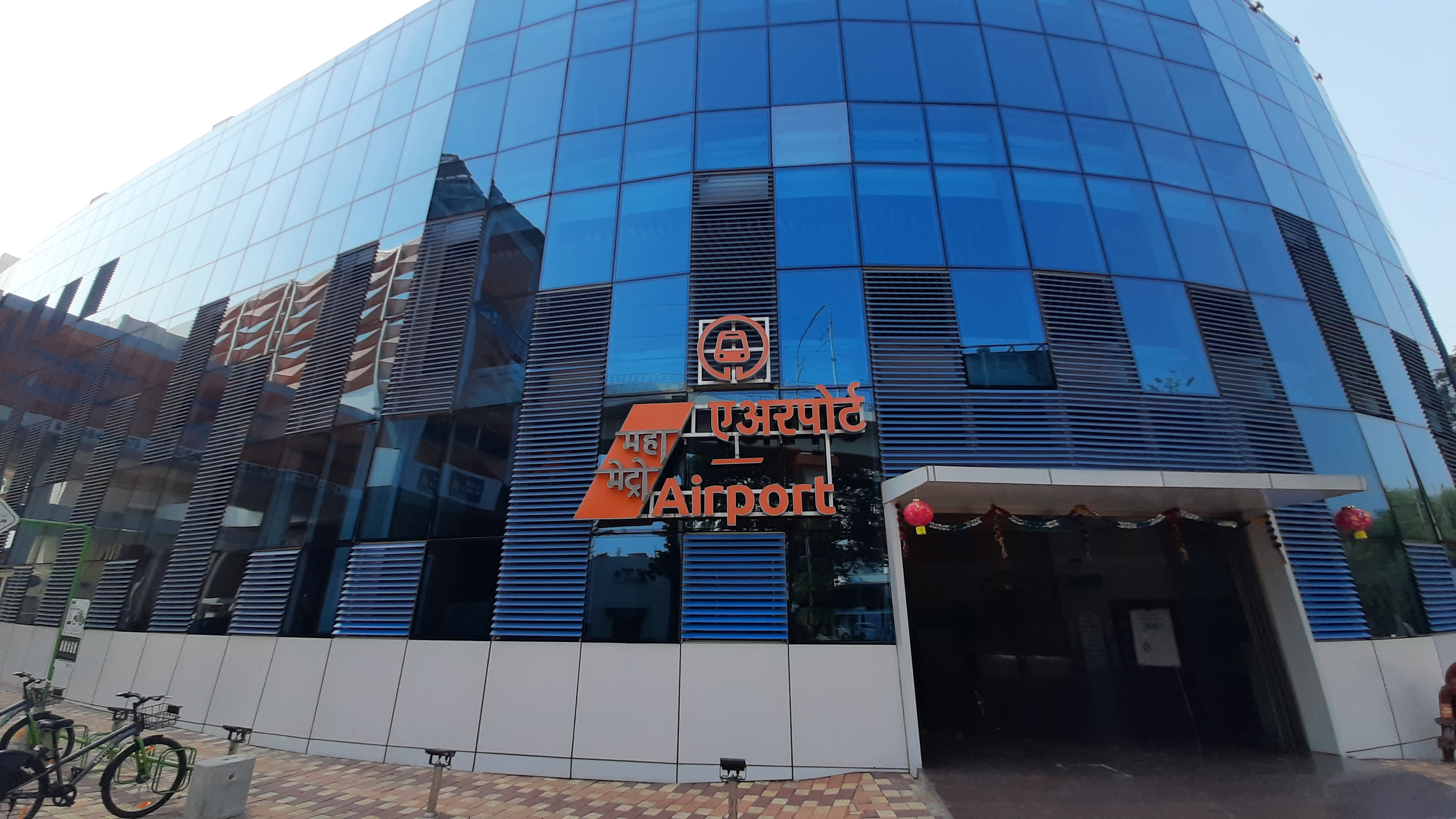

General information
- Location: New Manish Nagar, Sonegaon, Nagpur, Maharashtra 440005
- Coordinates: 21.0863°N 79.0638°E
- System: Nagpur Metro station
- Owner: Maharashtra Metro Rail Corporation Limited (MAHA-METRO)
- Operator: Nagpur Metro
- Line: Orange Line
- Platforms: Side platform Platform-1 → Automotive Square; Platform-2 → Khapri
- Tracks: 2

Construction
- Structure type: Elevated, Double track
- Platform levels: 2
- Accessible: Yes

History
- Opened: 8 March 2019; 7 years ago
- Electrified: 25 kV 50 Hz AC overhead catenary

Services
Preceding station	Nagpur Metro	Following station
Ujjwal Nagar towards Automotive Square	Orange Line	Airport South towards Khapri
Route map
Location

Airport is an elevated metro station on the North-South corridor of the Orange Line of Nagpur Metro in the city of Nagpur, Maharashtra. The station serves the Sonegaon area of Nagpur, and is linked by a feeder bus service to Dr. Babasaheb Ambedkar International Airport. It was opened to the public on 8 March 2019.

== Station layout ==
G	Street level	Exit/Entrance
L1	Mezzanine	Fare control, station agent, Metro Card vending machines, crossover
L2	Side platform | Doors will open on the left
L2	Platform 2 Southbound	Towards → Khapri; Next Station: Airport South
L2	Platform 1 Northbound	Towards ← Automotive Square; Next Station: Ujjwal Nagar
L2	Side platform | Doors will open on the left
L2

== See also ==
- Nagpur
- Maharashtra
- List of Nagpur Metro stations
- Rapid transit in India
