= Zero Mile Freedom Park metro station =

Nagpur Metro's Orange Line metro station

Zero Mile Freedom Park
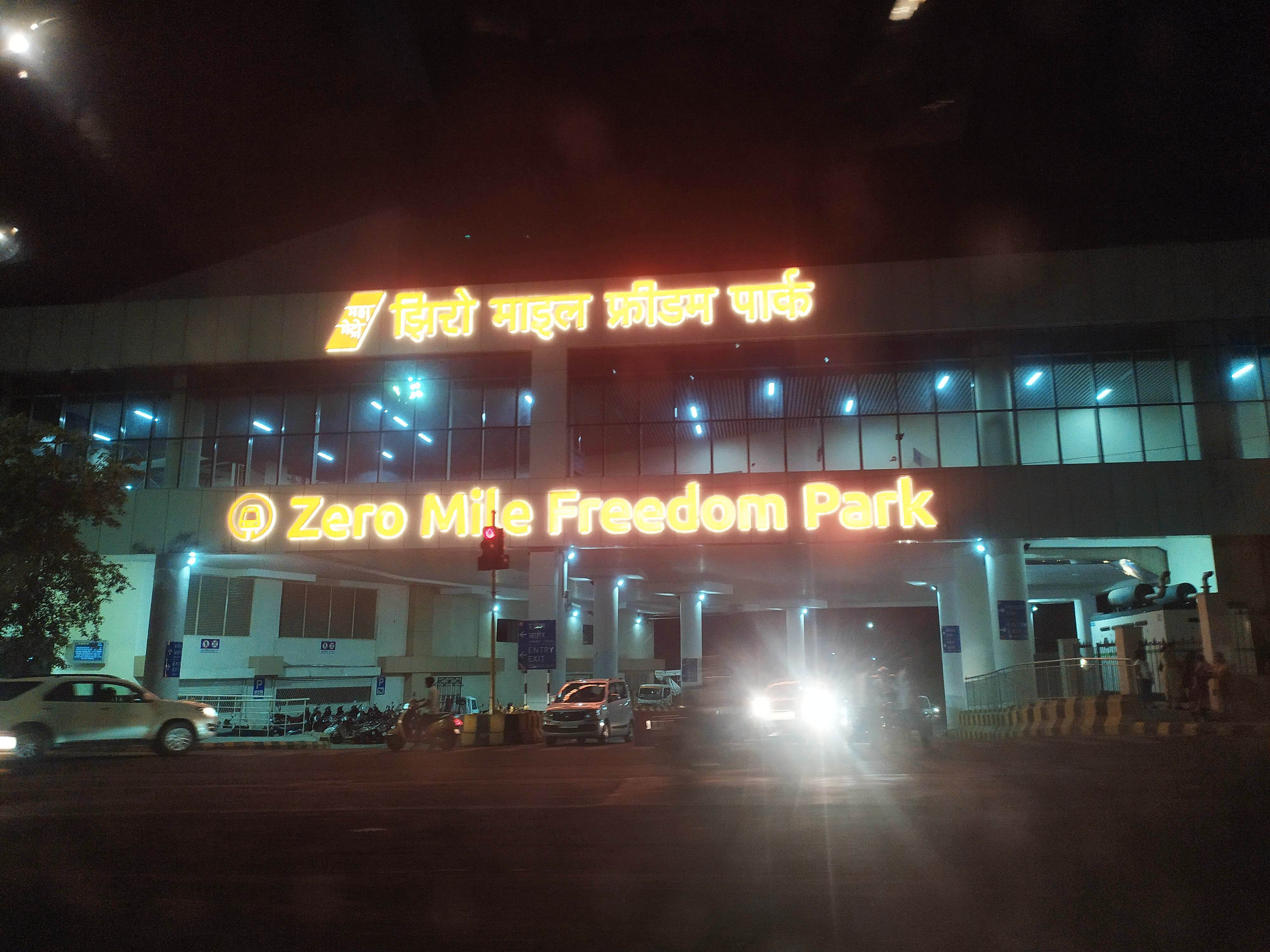

General information
- Location: Civil Lines, Nagpur, Maharashtra 440001
- Coordinates: 21.146703°N 79.080916°E
- System: Nagpur Metro station
- Owner: Maharashtra Metro Rail Corporation Limited (Maha Metro)
- Operator: Nagpur Metro
- Line: Orange Line
- Platforms: Side platform Platform-1 → Automotive Square; Platform-2 → Khapri
- Tracks: 2

Construction
- Structure type: Elevated, Double track
- Platform levels: 2
- Parking: available
- Accessible: Yes

History
- Opened: 21 August 2021
- Electrified: 25 kV 50 Hz AC overhead catenary

Services
Preceding station	Nagpur Metro	Following station
Kasturchand Park towards Automotive Square	Orange Line	Sitabuldi towards Khapri
Route map
Location

Zero Mile Freedom Park is an elevated metro station on the North-South corridor of the Orange Line of Nagpur Metro in the city of Nagpur, Maharashtra. It is named after the nearby Zero Mile Stone which was built in 1907 to mark the Great Trigonometrical Survey of India. The station was opened on 21 August 2021.

== Design ==
The Nagpur Metro Rail Corporation (now Maha Metro) launched a global competition on 5 June 2015 inviting bids for the Zero Mile and Sitaburdi metro stations. Twenty-three architecture firms submitted designs in response. The metro authority shortlisted 13 firms for the detailed design stage, and eventually requested four firms to submit designs. A panel of architects appointed by the authority to pick the winning design, and the preliminary design of the winning entry was unveiled by the metro authority in May 2016.

The Zero Mile station is a 20-storey building with two basements. The building's facade is made of locally sourced glass and stone. It is located on a 12,000 square metre plot of land on Wardha Road. Mahametro completed the demolition of a two-storey building of the fisheries department that was previously located on the site in January 2018.

The station is equipped with 8 escalators, 10 lifts, and also features multi-level parking with a capacity to accommodate 244 cars. Apart from the metro station and related facilities, the station building also contains hotels, restaurants, commercial places, offices, and a banquet hall. Zero Mile station also provides connectivity with the heritage walk around the Zero Mile Stone and Shaheed Smarak monuments. Also located near the station are an amphitheatre and a survey museum that will display the results of surveys conducted during the British Raj.

A Potain Tower Crane was utilized to speed up construction of the station.

== Station layout ==
G	Street level	Exit/Entrance
L1	Mezzanine	Fare control, station agent, Metro Card vending machines, crossover
L2	Side platform | Doors will open on the left
L2	Platform 2 Southbound	Towards → Khapri; Next Station: Sitabuldi Change at the next station for Aqua Line
L2	Platform 1 Northbound	Towards ← Automotive Square; Next Station: Kasturchand Park
L2	Side platform | Doors will open on the left
L2

== See also ==
- Nagpur
- Maharashtra
- List of Nagpur Metro stations
- Rapid transit in India
