= Congress Nagar metro station =

Metro station in Nagpur, Maharashtra

Congress Nagar
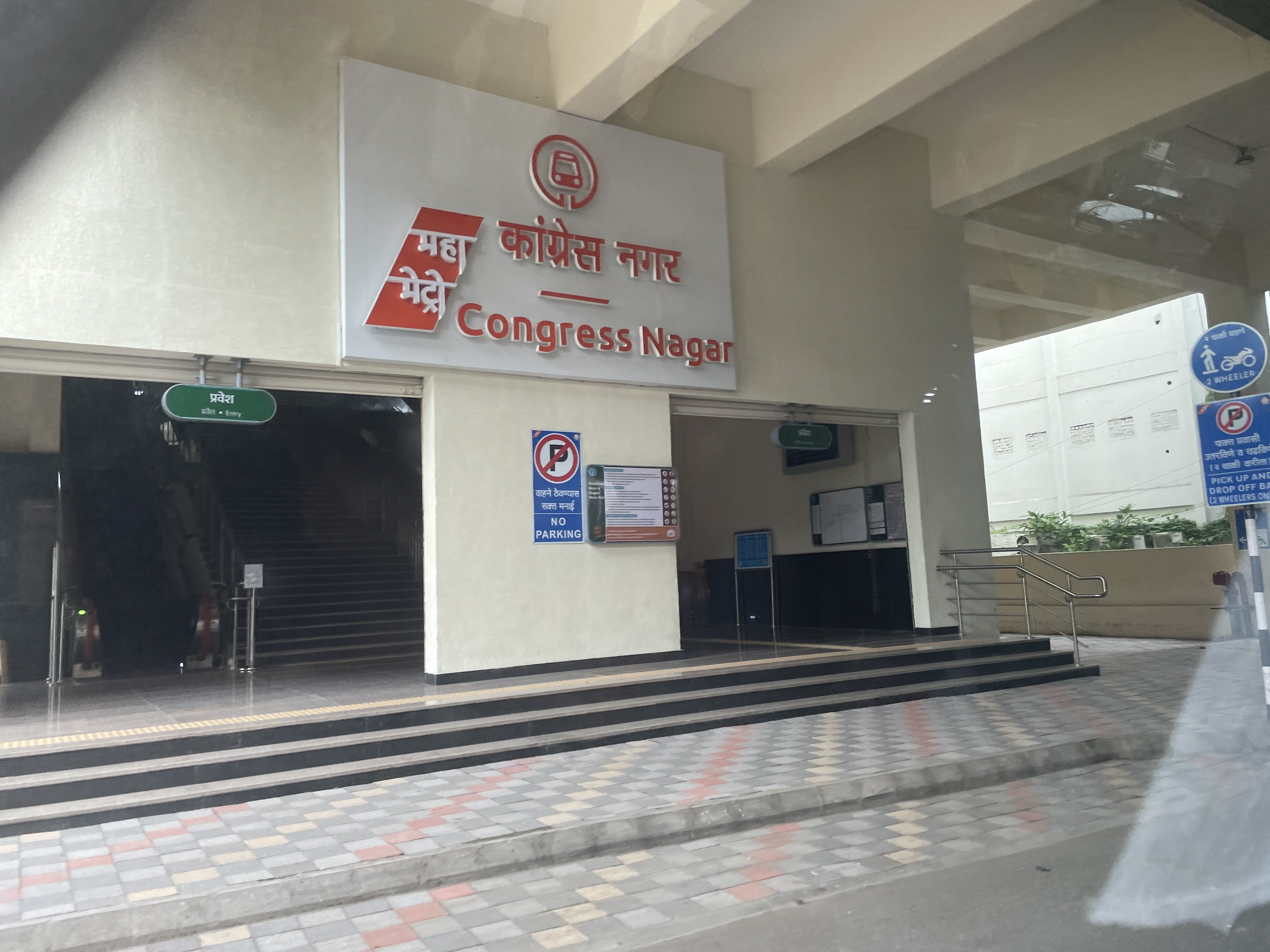

General information
- Location: Dhantoli, Nagpur, Maharashtra 440012
- Coordinates: 21.12811°N 79.08253°E
- System: Nagpur Metro station
- Owner: Maharashtra Metro Rail Corporation Limited (MAHA-METRO)
- Operator: Nagpur Metro
- Line: Orange Line
- Platforms: Side platform Platform-1 → Automotive Square; Platform-2 → Khapri
- Tracks: 2

Construction
- Structure type: Elevated, Double track
- Platform levels: 2
- Accessible: Yes

History
- Opened: 6 April 2021; 5 years ago
- Electrified: 25 kV 50 Hz AC overhead catenary

Services
Preceding station	Nagpur Metro	Following station
Sitabuldi towards Automotive Square	Orange Line	Rahate Colony towards Khapri
Route map
Location

Congress Nagar is an elevated metro station on the North-South corridor of the Orange Line of Nagpur Metro in the city of Nagpur, Maharashtra. It was opened on 6 April 2021. The station is connected to platform 1 of the Ajni railway station.

The station covers an area of 8,100 square meters.

== Station layout ==
G	Street level	Exit/Entrance
L1	Mezzanine	Fare control, station agent, Metro Card vending machines, crossover
L2	Side platform | Doors will open on the left
L2	Platform 2 Southbound	Towards → Khapri; Next Station: Rahate Colony
L2	Platform 1 Northbound	Towards ← Automotive Square; Next Station: Sitabuldi Change at the next station for Aqua Line
L2	Side platform | Doors will open on the left
L2

== See also ==
- Nagpur
- Maharashtra
- List of Nagpur Metro stations
- Rapid transit in India
