= Airport South metro station (Nagpur) =

Nagpur Metro's Orange Line metro station

Airport South
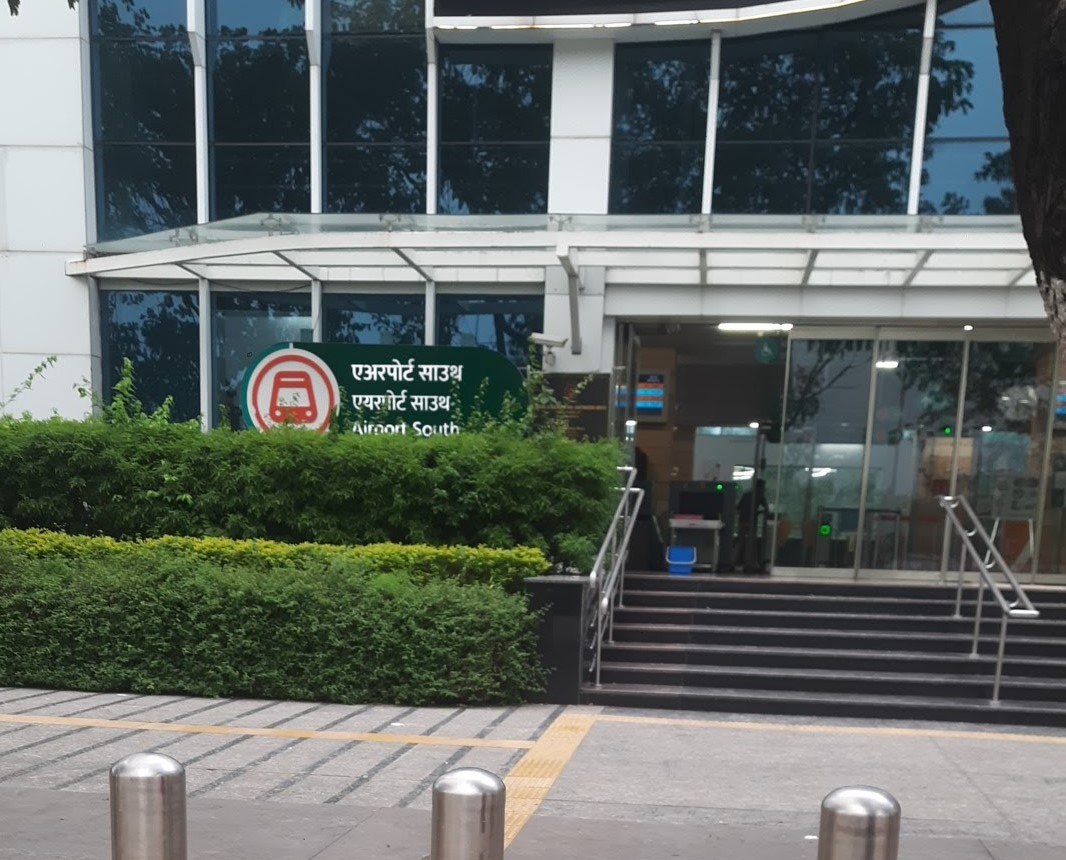

General information
- Location: Airport Colony, Somalwada, Nagpur, Maharashtra 440005
- Coordinates: 21.079023°N 79.060487°E
- System: Nagpur Metro station
- Owner: Maharashtra Metro Rail Corporation Limited (MAHA-METRO)
- Operator: Nagpur Metro
- Line: Orange Line
- Platforms: Side platform Platform-1 → Automotive Square; Platform-2 → Khapri
- Tracks: 2

Construction
- Structure type: At-Grade, Double track
- Platform levels: 2
- Accessible: Yes

History
- Opened: 8 March 2019; 7 years ago
- Electrified: 25 kV 50 Hz AC overhead catenary

Services
Preceding station	Nagpur Metro	Following station
Airport towards Automotive Square	Orange Line	New Airport towards Khapri
Route map
Location

Airport South is an at-grade metro station on the North-South corridor of the Orange Line of Nagpur Metro in the city of Nagpur, Maharashtra. This serves the Somalwada area of Nagpur. It was opened to the public on 8 March 2019.

The Nagpur Metro Rail Corporation Limited (now the Maharashtra Metro Rail Corporation Limited) awarded the contract to construct the station to Infrastructure Leasing & Financial Services (ILFS) in July 2016. Construction of the outer structure of the station was completed by November 2017, and interior work began in the same month. The station was awarded a platinum rating by the Indian Green Building Council, the highest rating the Council presents for sustainable construction practices that reduce environmental impact.

Mahametro began installing solar panels at the station on 4 June 2018. Construction of the station was completed by January 2019.

== Design ==
The Airport South station has a steel sheet roof and features primarily glass walls inspired by a green theme. Solar panels of 110 KW fitted on the station's roof supply around 65% of the total electricity required by the station. The station's upper floor houses a large hall which can be utilized to host conventions, weddings and other events.

Airport South is the first metro station in India to implement the Bio-digester technology. The Bio-digester, a sewage treatment system, was developed by the Defence Research and Development Organization (DRDO) and dedicated to the Swachh Bharat Abhiyan. The station is also equipped with a rainwater harvesting system. Two pits of 2.1-metre diameter each collect about 80% of the total runoff water to be harvested.

== Station layout ==
G	Street level	Exit/Entrance
L1	Mezzanine	Fare control, station agent, Metro Card vending machines, crossover
L2	Side platform | Doors will open on the left
L2	Platform 2 Southbound	Towards → Khapri; Next Station: New Airport
L2	Platform 1 Northbound	Towards ← Automotive Square; Next Station: Airport
L2	Side platform | Doors will open on the left
L2

== See also ==
- Nagpur
- Maharashtra
- List of Nagpur Metro stations
- Rapid transit in India
