= Rahate Colony metro station =

Nagpur Metro's Orange Line metro station

Rahate Colony
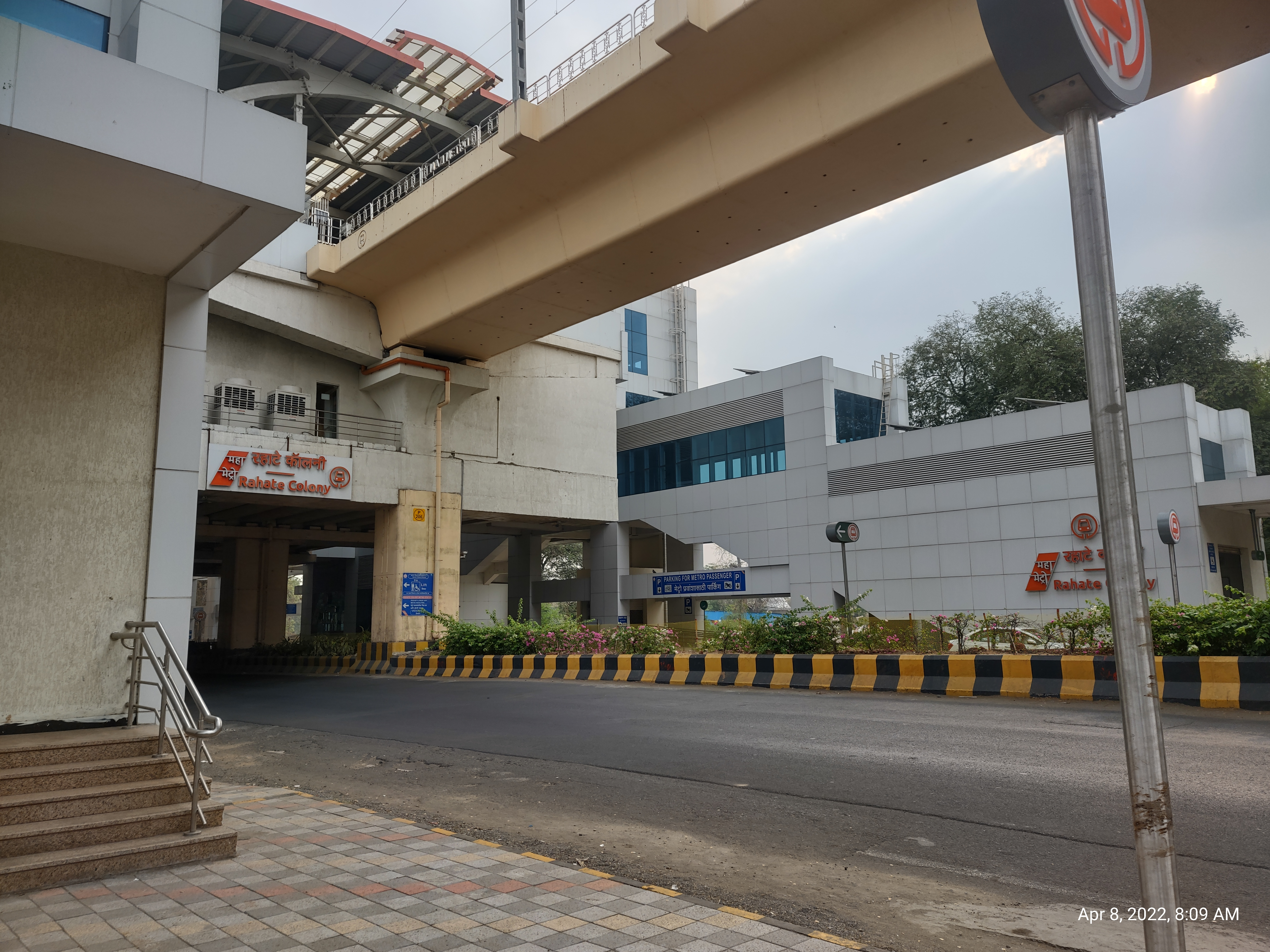

General information
- Location: Vasant Nagar, Nagpur, Maharashtra 440020
- Coordinates: 21.12774°N 79.07572°E
- System: Nagpur Metro station
- Owner: Maharashtra Metro Rail Corporation Limited (MAHA-METRO)
- Operator: Nagpur Metro
- Line: Orange Line
- Platforms: Side platform Platform-1 → Automotive Square; Platform-2 → Khapri
- Tracks: 2

Construction
- Structure type: Elevated, Double track
- Platform levels: 2
- Accessible: Yes

History
- Opened: 22 October 2020; 5 years ago
- Electrified: 25 kV 50 Hz AC overhead catenary

Services
Preceding station	Nagpur Metro	Following station
Congress Nagar towards Automotive Square	Orange Line	Ajni Square towards Khapri
Route map
Location

Rahate Colony is an elevated metro station on the North - South corridor of the Orange Line of Nagpur Metro in the city of Nagpur, Maharashtra. This serves the Rahate Colony area of Nagpur. It was opened on 22 October 2020.

== Station layout ==
G	Street level	Exit/Entrance
L1	Mezzanine	Fare control, station agent, Metro Card vending machines, crossover
L2	Side platform | Doors will open on the left
L2	Platform 2 Southbound	Towards → Khapri; Next Station: Ajni Square
L2	Platform 1 Northbound	Towards ← Automotive Square; Next Station: Congress Nagar
L2	Side platform | Doors will open on the left
L2

== See also ==
- Nagpur
- Maharashtra
- List of Nagpur Metro stations
- Rapid transit in India
