= Kasturchand Park metro station =

Nagpur Metro's Orange Line metro station

Kasturchand Park
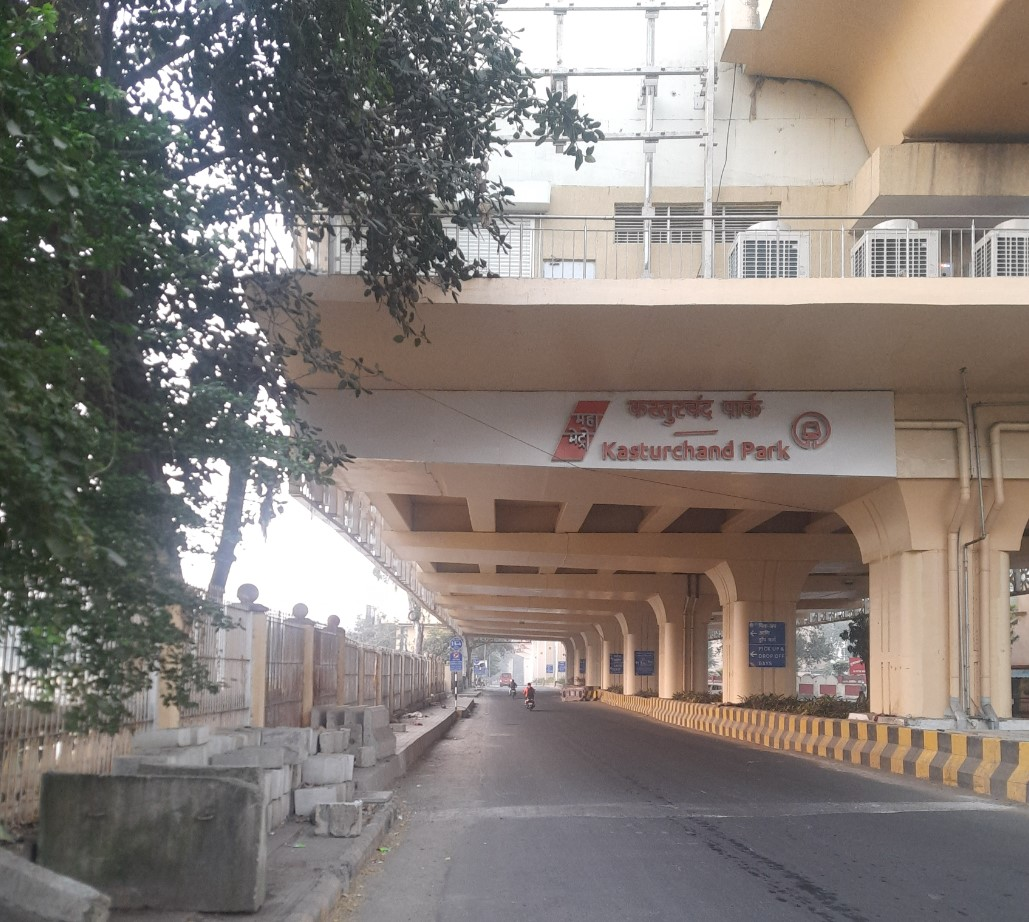

General information
- Location: Sitabuldi, Nagpur, Maharashtra 440001
- Coordinates: 21.15487°N 79.08150°E
- System: Nagpur Metro station
- Owner: Maharashtra Metro Rail Corporation Limited (MAHA Metro)
- Operator: Nagpur Metro
- Line: Orange Line
- Platforms: Side platform Platform-1 → Automotive Square; Platform-2 → Khapri
- Tracks: 2

Construction
- Structure type: Elevated, Double track
- Platform levels: 2
- Accessible: Yes

History
- Opened: 21 August 2021; 5 years ago
- Electrified: 25 kV 50 Hz AC overhead catenary

Services
Preceding station	Nagpur Metro	Following station
Gaddi Godam Square towards Automotive Square	Orange Line	Zero Mile Freedom Park towards Khapri
Route map
Location

Kasturchand Park is an elevated metro station on the North-South corridor of the Orange Line of Nagpur Metro in the city of Nagpur, Maharashtra. This serves the Kasturchand Park area. It was opened on 21 August 2021.

== Station layout ==
G	Street level	Exit/Entrance
L1	Mezzanine	Fare control, station agent, Metro Card vending machines, crossover
L2	Side platform | Doors will open on the left
L2	Platform 2 Southbound	Towards → Khapri; Next Station: Zero Mile Freedom Park
L2	Platform 1 Northbound	Towards ← Automotive Square; Next Station: Gaddi Godam Square
L2	Side platform | Doors will open on the left
L2

== See also ==
- Nagpur
- Maharashtra
- List of Nagpur Metro stations
- Rapid transit in India
