= Nagapuri =

Nagapuri may refer to places in India:

- Nagapur, a town in Maharashtra
- Nagpur, a city in Nanded, Maharashtra

== See also ==
- Nagpuri (disambiguation)
- Nagpur (disambiguation)
- Nagpuria (disambiguation)
- Nagapur, Medak mandal, village in Telangana, India
- Nagapur, Uttar Pradesh, India
