= New Airport metro station =

Nagpur Metro's Orange Line metro station

New Airport
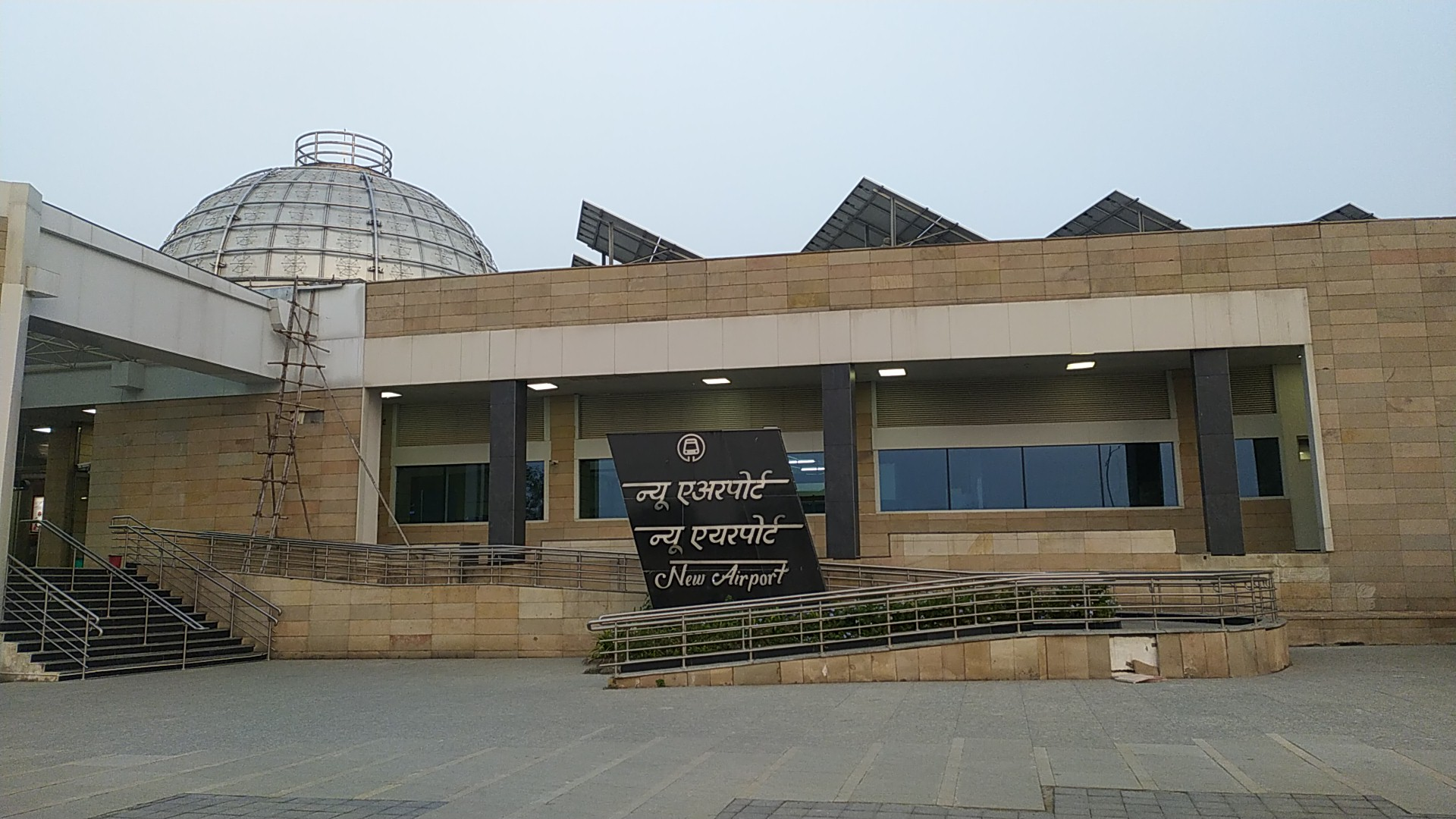

General information
- Location: MIHAN, Nagpur, Nagpur, Maharashtra 441108
- Coordinates: 21.06609°N 79.05584°E
- System: Nagpur Metro station
- Owner: Maharashtra Metro Rail Corporation Limited (MAHA-METRO)
- Operator: Nagpur Metro
- Line: Orange Line
- Platforms: Side platform Platform-1 → Automotive Square; Platform-2 → Khapri
- Tracks: 2

Construction
- Structure type: At-Grade, Double track
- Platform levels: 2
- Accessible: Yes
- Architectural style: Indo-Saracenic; Buddhist

History
- Opened: 8 March 2019; 7 years ago
- Electrified: 25 kV 50 Hz AC overhead catenary

Services
Preceding station	Nagpur Metro	Following station
Airport South towards Automotive Square	Orange Line	Khapri Terminus
Route map
Location

New Airport is an at-grade metro station on the North-South corridor of the Orange Line of Nagpur Metro in the city of Nagpur, Maharashtra. This serves the Kachore Patil Nagar area of Nagpur. It was opened to the public on 8 March 2019. The station is linked to Wardha Road through a short road.

The Nagpur Metro Rail Corporation Limited (now the Maharashtra Metro Rail Corporation Limited) awarded the contract to construct the station to Infrastructure Leasing & Financial Services (ILFS) in July 2016. Construction of the outer structure of the station was completed by November 2017, and interior work began in the same month. The station was awarded a platinum rating by the Indian Green Building Council, the highest rating the Council presents for sustainable construction practices that reduce environmental impact. Construction of the station was completed by January 2019.

== Design ==
The station's design was modeled on the Sanchi Stupa, and was built in the Indo-Saracenic style fused with features of Buddhist architecture. The station's entrance is a torana, the same structure used as the gateway of the Sanchi Stupa, and has a colonnade on either side. The station facade is made up of stone louvers and cladding. The outer facade features cream-coloured terracotta tiles which help control the temperature inside the station. Solar panels fitted on the station's roof supply around 65% of the total electricity required by the station.

A glass dome is located at a height of 40 meters atop the station. The dome is identical to the dome of the Sanchi Stupa and is topped with a chatra (parasol structure). The New Airport station dome weighs 23 tons, has a diameter of 13.4 meters and a height of 8.5 meters. Around 25 workers and architects worked on the construction of the dome. It was built using glass and stainless steel. It was built on the ground and then lifted atop the station by a crane with a lifting capacity of 200 ton. The dome does not require any routine maintenance, but may have to be monitored in the event of heavy rains. Polycarbonate sheets line the inner side of the dome, preventing damage from ultra violet radiation.

An eight-foot, sandstone sculpture of Buddha is located inside the station underneath the dome.

== Station layout ==
G	Street level	Exit/Entrance
L1	Mezzanine	Fare control, station agent, Metro Card vending machines, crossover
L2	Side platform | Doors will open on the left
L2	Platform 2 Southbound	Towards → Khapri
L2	Platform 1 Northbound	Towards ← Automotive Square; Next Station: Airport South
L2	Side platform | Doors will open on the left
L2

== See also ==
- Nagpur
- Maharashtra
- List of Nagpur Metro stations
- Rapid transit in India
