= Sitabuldi metro station =

Nagpur Metro's Orange & Aqua Line interchange station

Sitabuldi
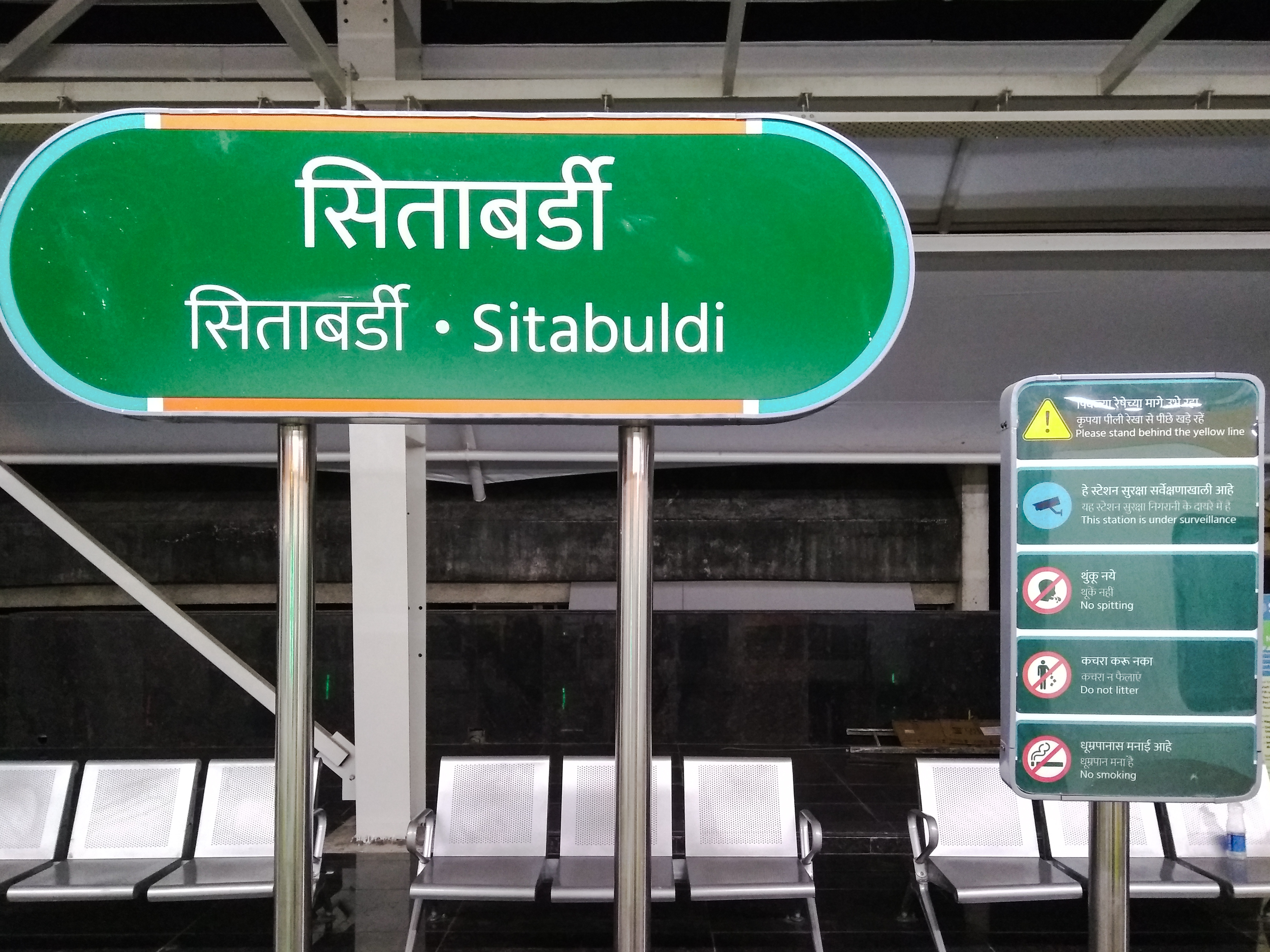

General information
- Location: Sitabuldi, Nagpur, Maharashtra 440012
- Coordinates: 21°08′29″N 79°04′59″E
- System: Nagpur Metro station
- Owner: Maharashtra Metro Rail Corporation Limited (Maha Metro)
- Operator: Nagpur Metro
- Line: Orange Line Aqua Line
- Platforms: Side platform Platform-1 → Automotive Square; Platform-2 → Khapri; Platform-3 → Prajapati Nagar; Platform-4 → Lokmanya Nagar
- Tracks: 4

Construction
- Structure type: Elevated, Double track
- Platform levels: 2
- Accessible: Yes

History
- Opened: 8 March 2019; 7 years ago
- Electrified: 25 kV 50 Hz AC overhead catenary

Services
Preceding station	Nagpur Metro	Following station
Zero Mile Freedom Park towards Automotive Square	Orange Line	Congress Nagar towards Khapri
Cotton Market towards Prajapati Nagar	Aqua Line	Jhansi Rani Square towards Lokmanya Nagar
Route map
Location

Sitabuldi is an elevated metro interchange station on the North-South corridor of the Orange Line and East-West corridor of the Aqua Line of Nagpur Metro in the city of Nagpur, Maharashtra, India which allows passengers to transfer between the Orange Line and the Aqua Line. It was opened to the public on 8 March 2019. Aqua Line services commenced on 28 January 2020. The station covers a total area of 250,000 square feet.

Sitabuldi is a central location of Nagpur, the Intra City bus stop is located near to metro station, while the Inter City bus stand at Ganeshpeth can be reached by autorickshaw or local bus.

== Design ==
The Nagpur Metro Rail Corporation (now Maha Metro) launched a global competition on 5 June 2015, inviting bids for the Sitaburdi and Zero Mile Freedom Park metro stations. Twenty-three architecture firms submitted designs in response. The metro authority shortlisted 13 firms for the detailed design stage, and eventually requested four firms to submit designs. A panel of architects appointed by the authority to pick the winning design, and the preliminary design of the winning entry was unveiled by the metro authority in May 2016.

The station was designed by a consortium of architects comprising Enia Architects, Mahendra Raj Consultants, and Worxpace Consulting. The building's facade is made of locally sourced glass and stone. The station is a T-shaped building. A three-storey building is located at the center of the "T" and a six-storey building is one of its arms facing Rani Jhansi Square. An art installation called the Crown of Nagpur was installed on top of the six-storey building. The Crown of Nagpur has a base shaped like an inverted flower with a crown over it and a transparent dome below the crown. The structure is 14 metres high, 35 metres long, and 25 metres wide. The inverted flower is composed of steel and polycarbonate, and the dome is made of polycarbonate. The polycarbonate sheets are lit with blue lights. The Crown of Nagpur also includes a 2-metre-long, 360° LED display intended to display advertisements. Mahametro also plans to open a restaurant on the terrace of the station, which would provide visitors with a view of the Crown of Nagpur.

The Solar Energy Corporation of India (SECI) and Mahametro began installing a 200 KW rooftop solar plant at the station in mid-2020 and completed work in December 2020. The plant will power the station's power needs for lighting fixtures, air conditioners, escalators, and elevators.

== Station layout ==
G	Street level	Exit/Entrance
L1	Mezzanine	Fare control, station agent, Metro Card vending machines, crossover
L2	Side platform | Doors will open on the left
L2	Platform 2 Southbound	Towards → Khapri; Next Station: Congress Nagar
L2	Platform 1 Northbound	Towards ← Automotive Square; Next Station: Zero Mile Freedom Park
L2	Side platform | Doors will open on the left
L2	Side platform | Doors will open on the left
L2	Platform 3 Eastbound	Towards → Prajapati Nagar; Next Station: Cotton Market
L2	Platform 4 Westbound	Towards ← Lokmanya Nagar; Next Station: Jhansi Rani Square
L2	Side platform | Doors will open on the left
L2

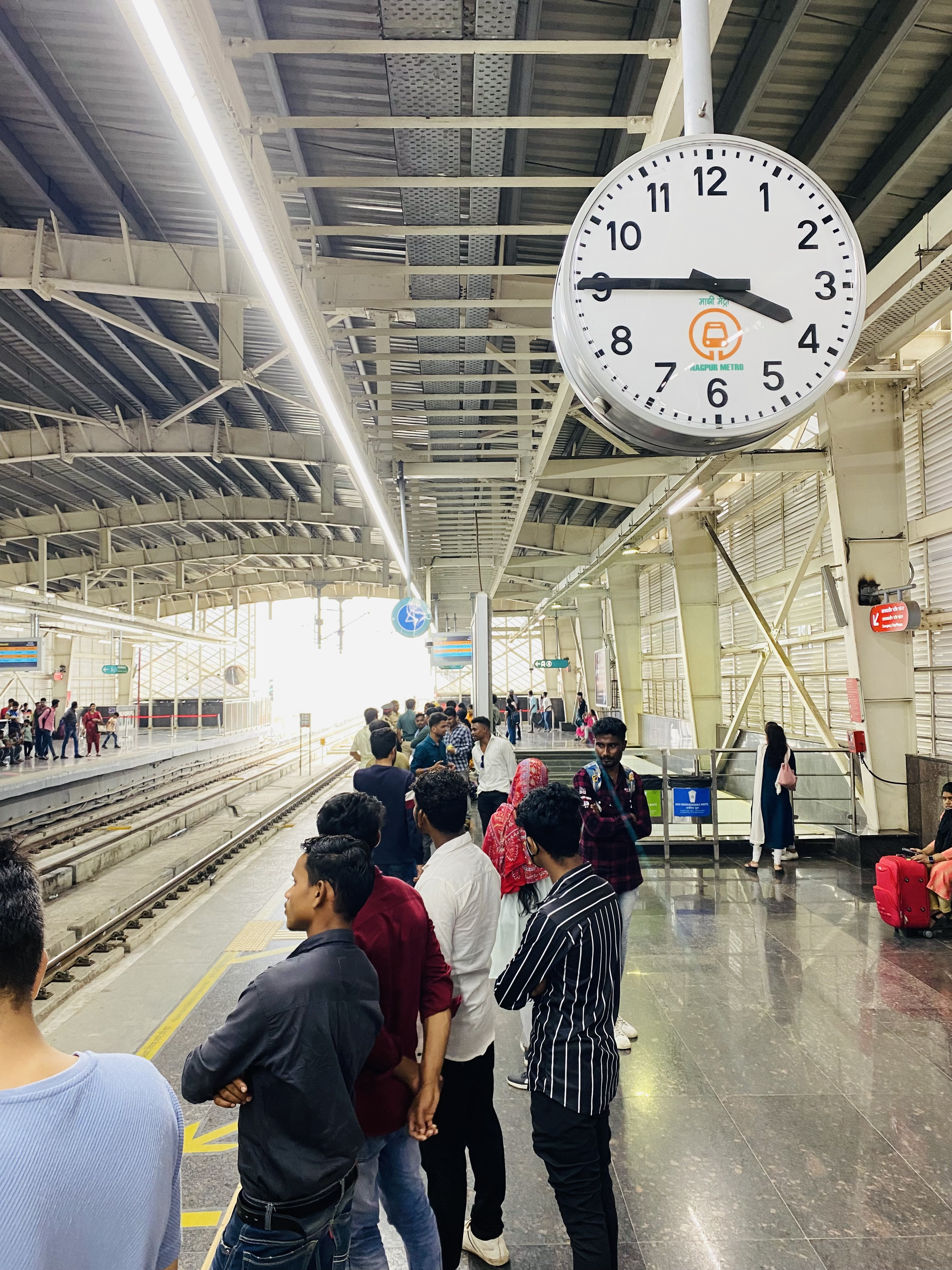

== See also ==
- Nagpur
- Maharashtra
- List of Nagpur Metro stations
- Rapid transit in India
