= Nagpur (disambiguation) =

Nagpur is a city and winter capital of the state of Maharashtra, India.

Nagpur may also refer to:

- Greater Nagpur Metropolitan Area, which includes the city of Nagpur
- Nagpur district, of which Nagpur is the headquarters
- Nagpur Metro, a railway project of Nagpur city
- Nagpur Junction railway station, a railway station of Nagpur city
- Nagpur–Bhusawal section, a railway route
- Nagpur–Secunderabad line, a railway route
- Nagpur Police, a police station of Nagpur city
- Nagpur division, which includes Nagpur district
- Nagpur Municipal Corporation
- Nagpur Improvement Trust
- Nagpur Province, a former province of British India
- Nagpur kingdom, a former kingdom of British India
- Nagpur (Lok Sabha constituency)
- Nagpur West (Vidhan Sabha constituency)
- Nagpur Central Museum, a museum of Nagpur
- Nagpur airport, an airport of Nagpur city
- Nagpur Duronto Express
- Nagpur orange, a fruit type

== See also ==
- Chota Nagpur (disambiguation)
- Nagpuri (disambiguation)
- Nagapuri (disambiguation)
- Nagpuria (disambiguation)
- Nagpuri people, an ethnic group of India
- Nagpuri, an Indo-Aryan language eastern India
- Nagpuriya dialect (Garhwal), an Indo-Aryan language North-western India
