= Chota Nagpur =

Chota Nagpur may refer to:

- Chota Nagpur Plateau, in eastern India
- Chota Nagpur Division, a division of British India
- Chota Nagpur Tributary States, a collection of princely states of British India (historic)
- North Chotanagpur division, one of the five divisions in the Indian state of Jharkhand
- South Chotanagpur division, one of the five divisions in the Indian state of Jharkhand

== See also ==
- Chota (disambiguation)
- Nagpur (disambiguation)
- Nagpuri (disambiguation)
- Nagpuria (disambiguation)
