= Chhota =

Chhota is the Hindi word for "small" or "little" and may refer to:

- Chhota Chhindwara, a town in Narsinghpur district in the state of Madhya Pradesh, India
- Chhota Gobindpur, a census town in Purbi Singhbhum district in the state of Jharkhand, India
- Chhota haazri, a meal served in households and barracks, particularly in northern British India, shortly after dawn
- Chhota Imambara, an imposing monument in the city of Lucknow, Uttar Pradesh, India
- Chhota Rajan (born 1957), Indian gangster and convicted criminal
- Chhota Saula, a village in Pirojpur District in the Barisal Division of southwestern Bangladesh
- Chhota Shakeel (born 1955 or 1960), Indian crime boss and drug trafficker
- Chhota Udaipur, a city and a municipality in Vadodara district in the state of Gujarat, India
- Chhota Udaipur (Lok Sabha constituency), a Lok Sabha parliamentary constituency in Gujarat

== See also ==
- Chota (disambiguation)
- Chhota Bheem, an Indian animated children's TV series
