= Airport South station =

Airport South station may refer to:

- Airport South station (Guangzhou Metro)
- Airport South metro station (Nagpur)
