= Chota =

Chota may refer to:

- Chota (Cherokee town), which once existed in present-day Monroe County, Tennessee, United States
- Chota, Ecuador
- Chota, Peru, a city in Chota District, the capital of Chota Province, Peru.
- Chota District, a district in Chota Province, Peru.
- Chota Province, a province of the Cajamarca Region in Peru
- Chota (automobile), an English automobile
- Chota (footballer), Spanish footballer
- Roman Catholic Territorial Prelature of Chota, Peru
- A dialect of the Sadri language
- A subdivision of a sotnia equivalent to a platoon

== See also ==
- Chhota (disambiguation)
- Chota Nagpur (disambiguation)
