= Orange Line (Nagpur Metro) =

Metro route of mass rapid transit system in Nagpur, India

Overview
- Status: Operational
- Locale: Nagpur
- Termini: Automotive Square; Khapri
- Stations: 18

Service
- Type: Rapid Transit
- System: Nagpur Metro
- Operator: Maha Metro
- Rolling stock: CRRC Dalian

History
- Opened: 8 March 2019; 7 years ago
- Inaugurated: 7 March 2019

Technical
- Line length: 19.658 km
- Character: At-Grade & Elevated
- Track gauge: 1,435 mm (4 ft 8 1/2 in) (Standard gauge)
- Electrification: 25 kV 50 Hz AC Overhead catenary

The Orange Line, also known as the North–south corridor, of the Nagpur Metro is a metro route of mass rapid transit system in Nagpur, India. It consists of 20 metro stations from Automotive Square to Metro City with a total distance of 19.658 km (12.2149 mi). Most of the line is elevated. It is the first line of the Nagpur Metro and was inaugurated by Prime Minister Narendra Modi on 7 March 2019, and opened to the public the next day on International Women's Day.

This corridor originates from Automotive Square on Kamptee Road; moves along Kamptee Road and reaches the intersection point of Amravati Road and Wardha Road, then after crossing a flyover moves towards Munje Square, moves towards Dhantoli and along nala moves towards Empire/Dr Munje Marg, leads towards Congress Nagar T-Point, then on Rahate Colony Road and then falls on Wardha Road, leads towards NEERI, then moves along Wardha Road and then west of Railway Track in MIHAN area. And passes through 14 m (46 ft) wide stretch of land between the railway boundary line and the road near proposed Container Depot.

Entire length (22.2938 km (13.8527 mi)) of this corridor is proposed as elevated except in 4.6 km (2.8583 mi) at grade after Airport Station and in MIHAN area near Khapri Railway Station. There are 20 stations on this corridor of which 15 stations are elevated and 5 stations are at Grade. Sitaburdi Station is an inter-change station. Average inter-station distance is 1.2 km (0.7456 mi) approximately varying from 0.54 to 2.4 km (0.3355 to 1.4913 mi) depending upon the site, operational and traffic requirements.

This line initially started operations with five stations opening in the stretch between Sitabuldi and Khapri on 8 March 2019.

== List of stations ==
Following is a list of stations on this route-

Orange Line
#	Station Name		Opened	Chainage (in metre)	Distance from previous station	Connections	Layout
#	English	Marathi	Opened	Chainage (in metre)	Distance from previous station	Connections	Layout
1	Automotive Square	ऑटोमोटिव्ह चौक	11 December 2022	0.0	0.0	None	Elevated
2	Nari Road	नारी रोड	11 December 2022	975.8	975.8	None	Elevated
3	Indora Square	इंदोरा चौक	11 December 2022	2139.7	1163.9	None	Elevated
4	Kadvi Chowk	कडबी चौक	11 December 2022	3181.2	1041.5	None	Elevated
5	Gaddi Godam Square	गड्डीगोदाम चौक	11 December 2022	4399.0	1217.8	None	Elevated
6	Kasturchand Park	कस्तुरचंद पार्क	21 August 2021	5148.6	749.6	None	Elevated
7	Zero Mile Freedom Park	झिरो माइल फ्रीडम पार्क	21 August 2021	6175.5	1026.9	None	Elevated
8	Sitabuldi	सिताबर्डी	8 March 2019	6709.2	533.7	Aqua Line	Elevated
9	Congress Nagar	काँग्रेस नगर	6 April 2021	7897.2	1188.0	None	Elevated
10	Rahate Colony	रहाटे कॉलनी	22 October 2020	8682.6	785.4	None	Elevated
11	Ajni Square	अजनी चौक	22 October 2020	10104.7	1422.1	None	Elevated
12	Chhatrapati Square	छत्रपती चौक	6 April 2021	11146.3	1041.6	None	Elevated
13	Jaiprakash Nagar	जयप्रकाश नगर	20 November 2019	11811.5	665.2	None	Elevated
14	Ujjwal Nagar	उज्ज्वल नगर	6 April 2021	12846.6	1035.1	None	Elevated
15	Airport	एअरपोर्ट	8 March 2019	13784.9	938.3	None	Elevated
16	Airport South	एअरपोर्ट साउथ	8 March 2019	-	-	None	At-grade
17	New Airport	न्यू एअरपोर्ट	8 March 2019	16184.4	2399.5	None	At-grade
18	Khapri	खापरी	8 March 2019	18460.6	2276.2	None	At-grade

== See also ==
- Nagpur Metro
- List of Nagpur Metro stations
- Aqua Line (Nagpur Metro)
- Maharashtra Metro Rail Corporation Limited
