= Nagpuri =

Nagpuri may refer to the following entities associated with India:

- Nagpuri people, an ethnic group native to Chota Nagpur, Jharkhand and surrounding areas
- Nagpuri language, or Sadri, an Indo-Aryan language spoken in Jharkhand and surrounding areas
- Nagpuri cinema, Indian cinema in the Nagpuri or Sadri language of Jharkhand
- Nagpuri dialect (Maharashtra), a variety of the Varhadi dialect spoken in Nagpur, Maharashtra
- Nagpuri (buffalo), a breed of cattle from Maharashtra

== See also ==
- Nagapuri (disambiguation)
- Nagpur (disambiguation)
- Nagpuria (disambiguation)
- Sadri (disambiguation), another term for the Nagpuri language
- Chota Nagpur (disambiguation)
- Nagpuria dialect (Garhwal), a distinct Indo-Aryan language of Garhwal, Uttarakhand, India
