= Chhota Saula =

- Location in Bangladesh
- Coordinates: 22°24′N 90°1′E
- Country: Bangladesh
- Division: Barisal Division
- District: Pirojpur District
- Time zone: UTC+6 (Bangladesh Time)

Chhota Saula is a village in Pirojpur District in the Barisal Division of southwestern Bangladesh.
