= Nagapur, Medak mandal =

Nagapuram
- Village
- Country: India
- State: Telangana
- District: Medak
- Mandal: Medak

Languages
  - Official: Telugu
- Time zone: UTC+5:30 (IST)

Nagapuram is a village in Medak district of the Indian state of Telangana. It is located in Medak mandal of Medak revenue division.
