= Nagapur, Uttar Pradesh =

Nagapur Motilalapur
- Village
- Location of Nagapur Katra Gulab Singh in Uttar Pradesh Nagapur (India)
- Coordinates: 25.9161°N 81.86074°E
- Country: India
- State: Uttar Pradesh
- District: Pratapgarh

Nagapur is a village in the Pratapgarh district of Uttar Pradesh state, India. It is part of the Katra Gulab Singh postal district.
