= Nagpuria =

Nagpuria or Nagpuriya may refer to:

- Nagpuria people, an ethnic group mainly found in Jharkhand, India
- Nagpuria language, or Sadri, a language mainly spoken in Jharkhand, India
- Nagpuria dialect (Garhwal), a language variety of Uttarakhand, India

== See also ==
- Nagpuri (disambiguation)
- Nagapuri (disambiguation)
