= Khapri metro station =

Nagpur Metro's Orange Line terminal metro station

Khapari
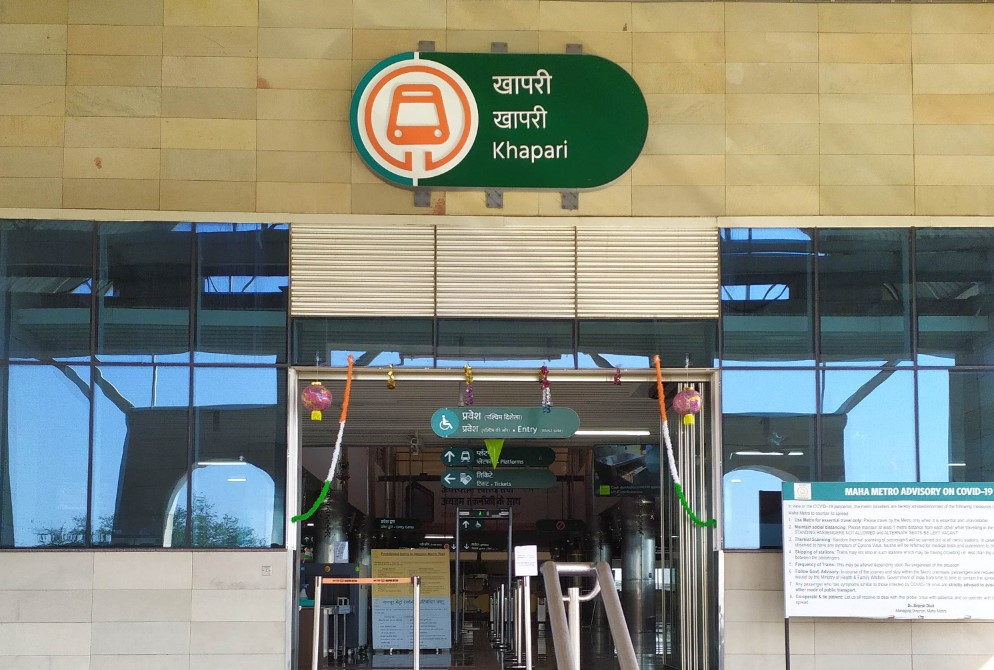

General information
- Location: MIHAN, Nagpur, Maharashtra 441108
- Coordinates: 21.04955°N 79.04792°E
- System: Nagpur Metro station
- Owner: Maharashtra Metro Rail Corporation Limited (MAHA-METRO)
- Operator: Nagpur Metro
- Line: Orange Line
- Platforms: Side platform Platform-1 → Automotive Square; Platform-2 → Train Terminates Here
- Tracks: 2

Construction
- Structure type: At-Grade, Double track
- Platform levels: 2
- Parking: available
- Accessible: Yes
- Architectural style: Victorian

History
- Opened: 8 March 2019; 7 years ago
- Electrified: 25 kV 50 Hz AC overhead catenary

Services
Preceding station	Nagpur Metro	Following station
New Airport towards Automotive Square	Orange Line	Terminus
Future service
New Airport towards Automotive Square	Orange Line	Eco Park towards Metro City
Route map
Location

Khapri is the at-grade southern terminal metro station on the North-South corridor of the Orange Line of Nagpur Metro in the city of Nagpur, Maharashtra.serving the Khapri area of Nagpur. It was opened to the public on 8 March 2019. The station is integrated with the Khapri railway station, and is linked with Wardha Road via a subway that passes under the main railway line.

The Nagpur Metro Rail Corporation Limited (now the Maharashtra Metro Rail Corporation Limited) awarded the contract to construct the station to Infrastructure Leasing & Financial Services (ILFS) in July 2016. Construction of the outer structure of the station was completed by November 2017, and interior work began in the same month. The station was awarded a platinum rating by the Indian Green Building Council, the highest rating the Council presents for sustainable construction practices that reduce environmental impact. Construction of the station was completed by January 2019.

The station was originally proposed to be the southern terminus of the North-South Line. However, on 22 November 2017, Mahametro announced a 3 km southern extension to the line which added two new stations - Ecopark and Metro City - the latter becoming the southern terminus.

== Design ==
The station's design was modeled on the Bandra suburban railway station in Mumbai, built in the Victorian style. Like Bandra station, Khapri station has a red roof covered by terracotta tiles, white-coloured steel trusses and a clock tower. Solar panels fitted on the station's roof supply around 65% of the total electricity required by the station.

The station's interiors are adorned by paintings, sculptures and other art depicting the culture of Nagpur, Vidarbha, Maharashtra and India. The station also contains shops and restaurants which occupy a total commercial space of about 15,000 square feet. The station has parking facilities that can accommodate 30 cars and 100 two-wheelers.

== Station layout ==
G	Street level	Exit/Entrance
L1	Mezzanine	Fare control, station agent, Metro Card vending machines, crossover
L2	Side platform | Doors will open on the left
L2	Platform 2 Southbound	Towards → Train Terminates Here
L2	Platform 1 Northbound	Towards ← Automotive Square; Next Station: New Airport
L2	Side platform | Doors will open on the left
L2

== See also ==
- Nagpur
- Maharashtra
- List of Nagpur Metro stations
- Rapid transit in India
