= Nagpur Metro =

Rapid transit system in Nagpur, India

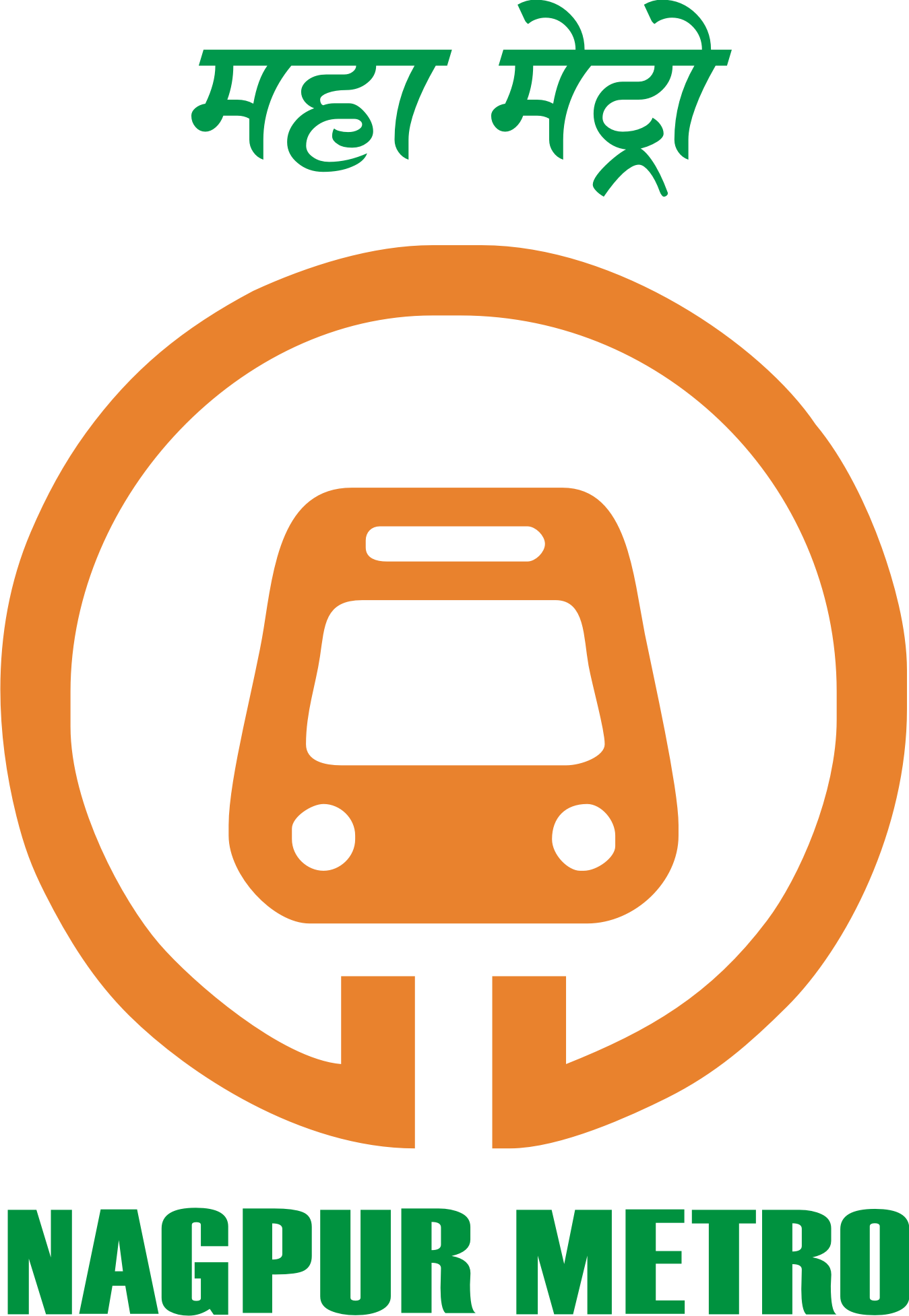

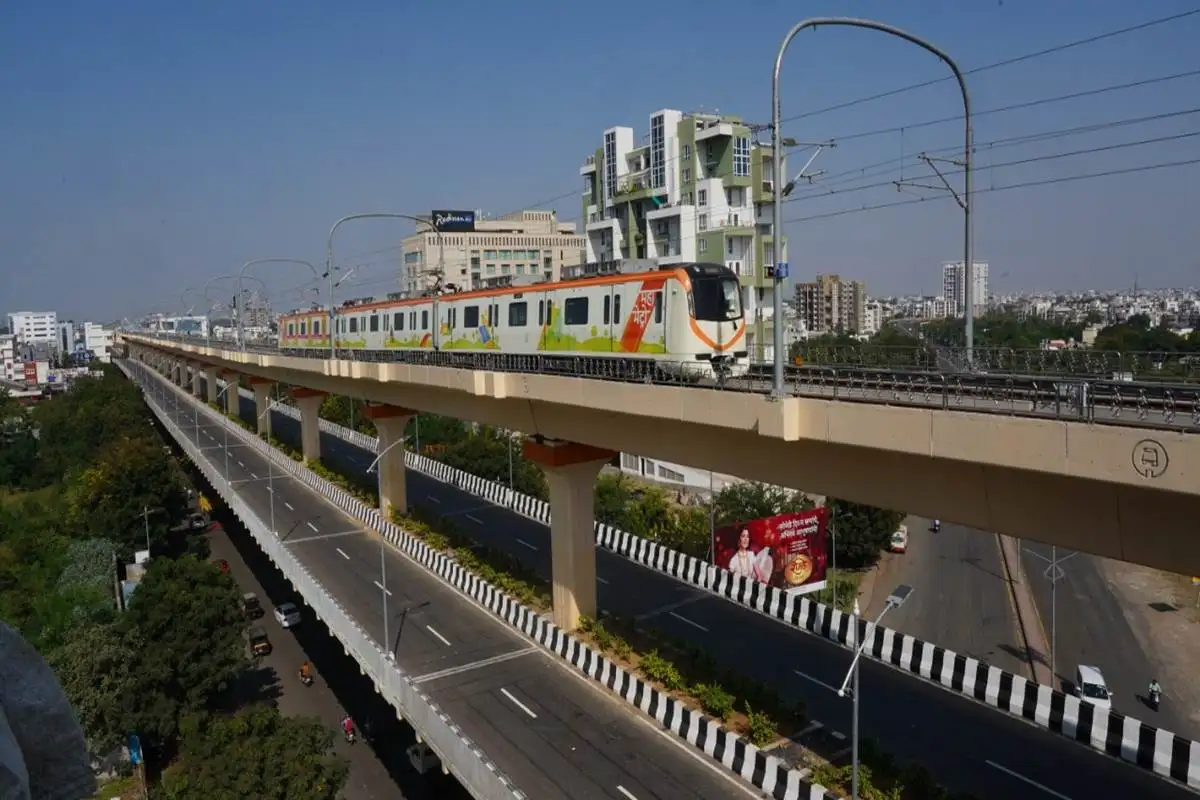
- A Orange line train on double deck elevated corridor

Overview
- Owner: Maharashtra Metro Rail Corporation Limited
- Locale: Nagpur, Maharashtra, India
- Transit type: Rapid Transit
- Number of lines: 2
- Line number: Orange Line; Aqua Line
- Number of stations: 37 (Note: Interchange stations are counted only once. There is 1 interchange station. If added the number goes up to 38 stations)
- Daily ridership: 200,000
- Chief executive: Shravan Hardikar (MD)
- Headquarters: Metro Bhawan; VIP road, Deeksha Bhoomi, Nagpur
- Website: Nagpur Metro

Operation
- Began operation: March 8, 2019; 7 years ago
- Operator: Maharashtra Metro Rail Corporation Limited
- Train length: 3 coaches
- Headway: 10 minutes

Technical
- System length: 38.2 km (23.7 mi)
- Track gauge: 1,435 mm (4 ft 8 1/2 in) standard gauge
- Electrification: 25 kV 50 Hz AC overhead catenary
- Average speed: 33 km/h
- Top speed: 90 km/h

Nagpur Metro, also called as Majhi Metro is a rapid transit system for the city of Nagpur, located in the state of Maharashtra, India. The system consists of 2 colour-coded lines serving 37 stations, with a total length of 38.2 kilometres (23.7 mi). It is also being touted as the greenest metro rail in India.

According to journalistic accounts, the metro project influenced livelihoods and urban lifestyle patterns in the city.The Prime minister of India, Narendra Modi inaugurated operations on Nagpur Metro on 8 March 2019 via video conferencing along with Chief Minister of Maharashtra, Devendra Fadnavis and Union Cabinet Minister Nitin Gadkari.

== History ==
The project was conceived during 2012, when cities of more than 2 million were made eligible for having a metro rail system. This decision by the government made 12 cities in India eligible for metro rail, including Nagpur. Kamal Nath, then Union minister for urban development, proposed a metro system in Nagpur and called for a detailed project report from the state government. On 22 February 2012, the Nagpur Improvement Trust (NIT) signed an agreement with Delhi Metro Rail Corporation (DMRC) to prepare the Detailed Project Report (DPR) for the metro rail in Nagpur. The Central Ministry had allocated ₹2.4 crore (equivalent to ₹4.9 crore or US$530,000 in 2026) to the State Government for carrying out the DPR work.

=== Special Purpose Vehicle ===
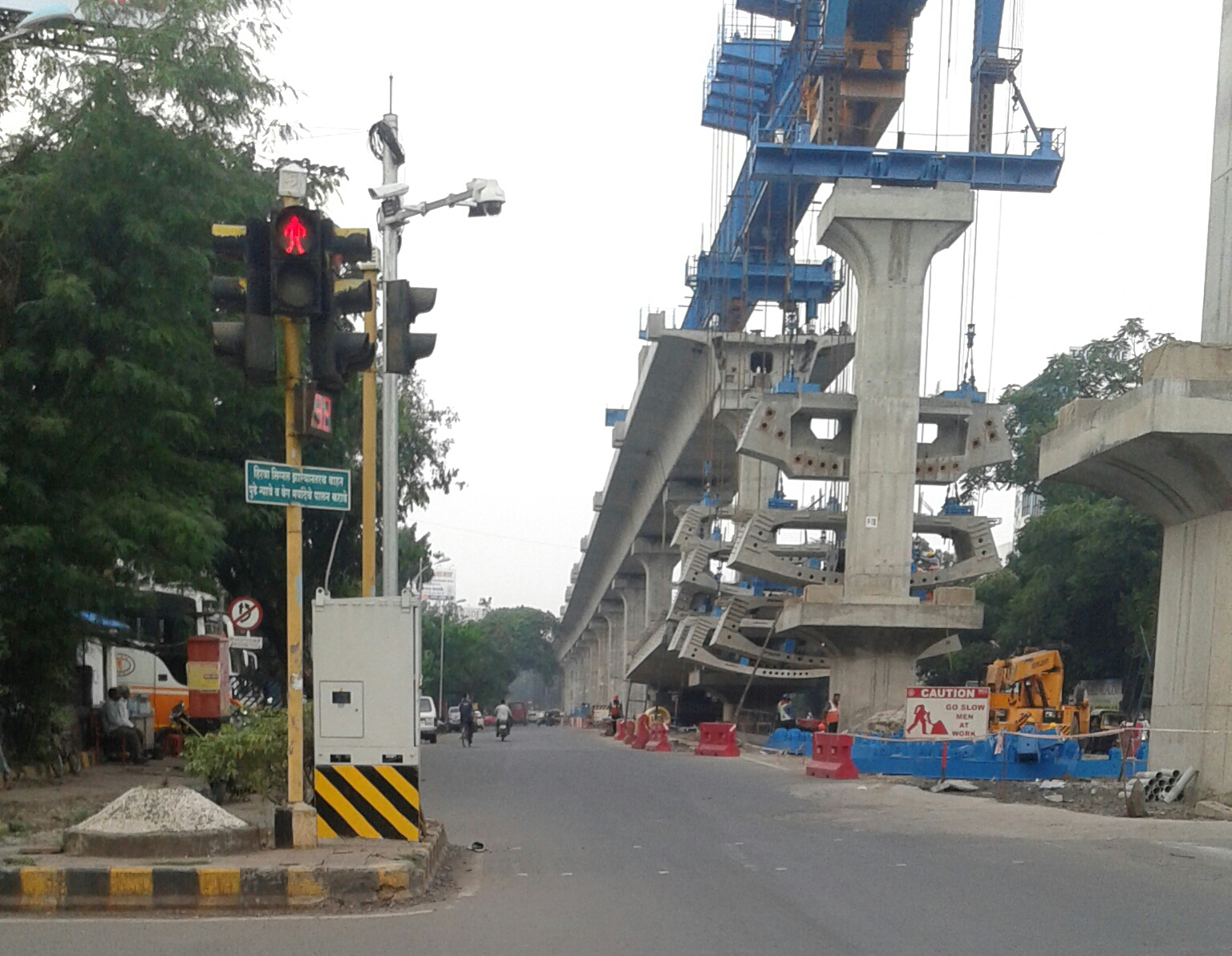
Viaduct under construction on Wardha Road

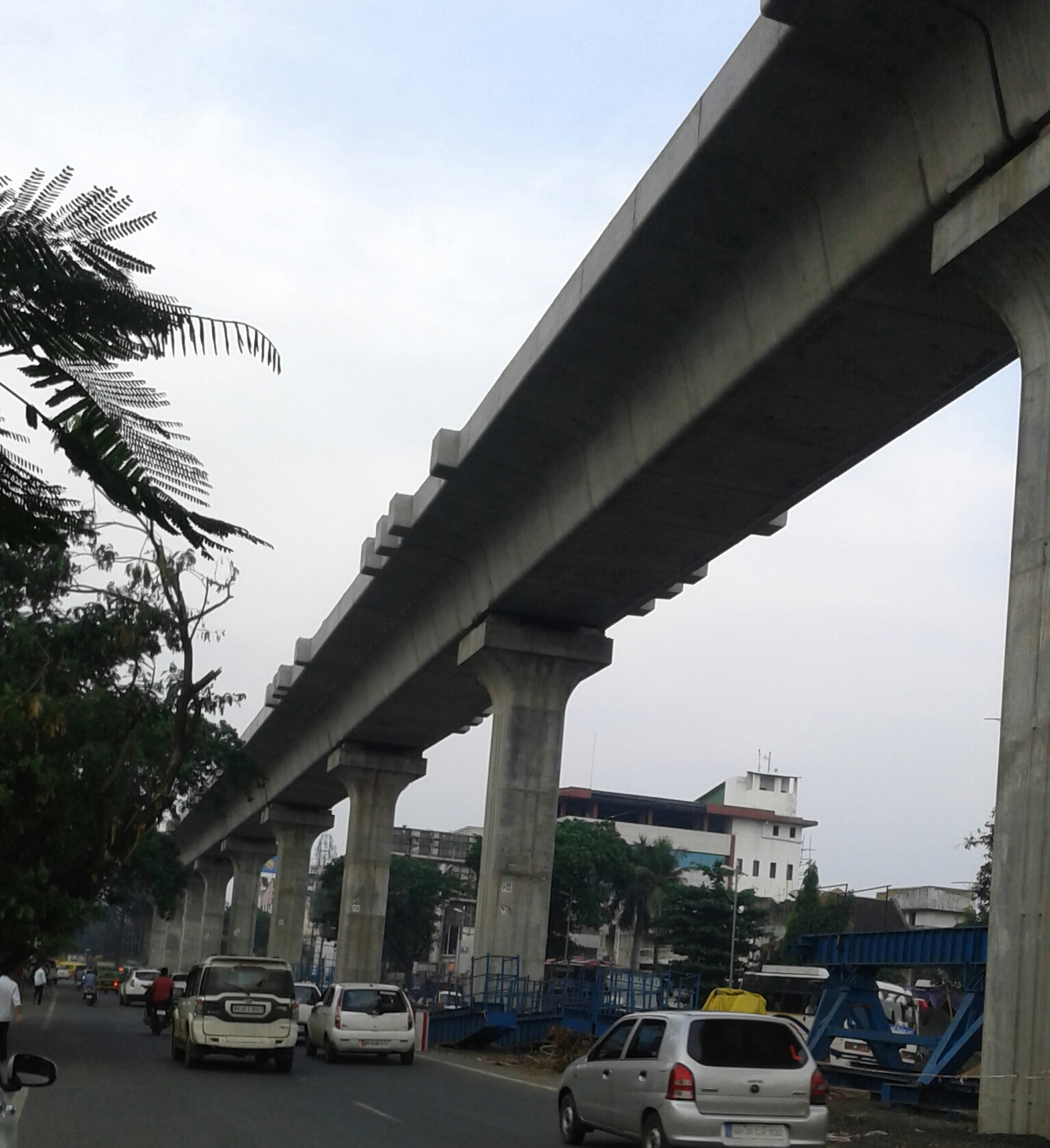
Viaduct of Nagpur Metro near Chhatrapati flyover

To execute the project, the Cabinet approved setting up of Nagpur Metro Rail Corporation Limited (NMRCL) now known as Maharashtra Metro Rail Corporation Limited (MAHA-METRO). Maha Metro is a Special Purpose Vehicle (SPV) created for the smooth implementation and operations of the Nagpur Metro Rail Project and is a joint venture of the Government of India and the Government of Maharashtra, with 50:50 equity. Maha Metro is solely responsible for the successful and timely completion of the project and its subsequent operations. Journalist Sarita Kaushik, in her book ''Better Than the Dream: A People's Story'', describes the Nagpur Metro project as an example of urban infrastructure influencing social life and everyday mobility patterns in Indian cities.

== Construction Phases ==
=== Phase 1 ===
==== Detailed Project Report ====
DMRC submitted the report to the nodal agency Nagpur Improvement Trust on 12 February 2013. The total cost of the project was estimated at ₹9,000 crore. The project consisted of two routes: Automotive square, Kamptee to MIHAN Metro depot and Prajapati Nagar, East Wardhaman Nagar to Lokmanya Nagar, Hingna. There would be 17 stations on Route no. 1 with a terminal-depot at MIHAN and 19 stations on Route no. 2 with a terminal-depot at Lokmanya Nagar. A cross major station was proposed at Munje Square where the two routes would meet and commuters could transfer.

It was expected that 12.21 per cent of Nagpur's estimated population of 29 lakh in 2021, i.e., around 3,63,000 commuters would use the Metro by 2021.

To provide first and last mile connectivity, feeder services such as shuttle buses, battery operated vehicles, pedestrian facilities and bicycle sharing schemes were included in the project. There would be 19 feeder routes covering all stations and a total distance of around 160 km (99 mi). Feeder services would enhance the accessibility of the Metro for all types of commuters, to and from homes and offices.

==== Metro Rail Expenditure ====
The Total Expenditure of the Project was estimated to ₹8,680 crore (US$930 million) with the Central Government and State Government each contributing 20% share in the form of equity and subordinate debt. Nagpur Municipal Corporation and Nagpur Improvement Trust each will give 5% share of the expenditure while the rest 50% is being financed via loan.

KfW, a German government-owned development bank, provided loans of ₹3,700 crore (US$400 million) to Maharashtra Metro Rail Corporation Limited as a part of fund required for the project, with an additional ₹444 crore (US$47 million) loan for the feeder service and 6 MW solar energy installation at Nagpur Metro stations in partnership with AMPIN Energy Transition. The remaining amount of about €130 million was provided by AFD France. The 20-year credit, is used for funding signalling, telecommunication, automatic fare collection systems, lifts and escalators.

In October 2022, the Government of Maharashtra approved the revised project cost of ₹9,279 crore (equivalent to ₹110 billion or US$1.1 billion in 2026) for Phase I with costs overshooting the budgeted amount by ₹599 crore (equivalent to ₹693 crore or US$74 million in 2026).

==== Proposed Alignment by DMRC ====
In early 2012 Nagpur Improvement Trust (NIT) requested DMRC to provide Consultancy services for preparation of a Detailed Project Report for Metro Rail System in Nagpur, Maharashtra initially for 30 km (19 mi) which was revised to 42 km (26 mi) in July 2012. Thereafter, DMRC conducted Traffic Surveys, Topographical Surveys, Geotechnical Investigations and Environment Impact Assessment Survey. The study area consisted of Nagpur Municipal Corporation Area. The study area totalled to approximately 217 km (135 mi). Based on the different types of surveys done by DMRC, metro alignments were finalised after repeated inspection of the road network, intersections, passenger traffic flow, traffic congestion, connectivity to important land uses.

Alignment (Proposed by DMRC)	Detail Route
Alignment-1: Orange Line (North-South Corridor) (22.293 km (13.852 mi), 20 stations)	Automotive Square, along Kamptee Road, Wardha Road, Variety Square to Abhyankar Road, along Nag River alignment will fall on Humpyard Road, Rahate Colony Road, Wardha Road, Khamla Road, Airport, MIHAN Area
Alignment-2: Aqua Line (East – West Corridor) (19.407 km (12.059 mi), 20 stations)	From Prajapati Nagar, along Central Avenue Road, Railway Feeder Road, Munje Square, Jhansi Rani Square, North Ambajhari Road, Hingna Road, Lokmanya Nagar

==== Realignment of route ====
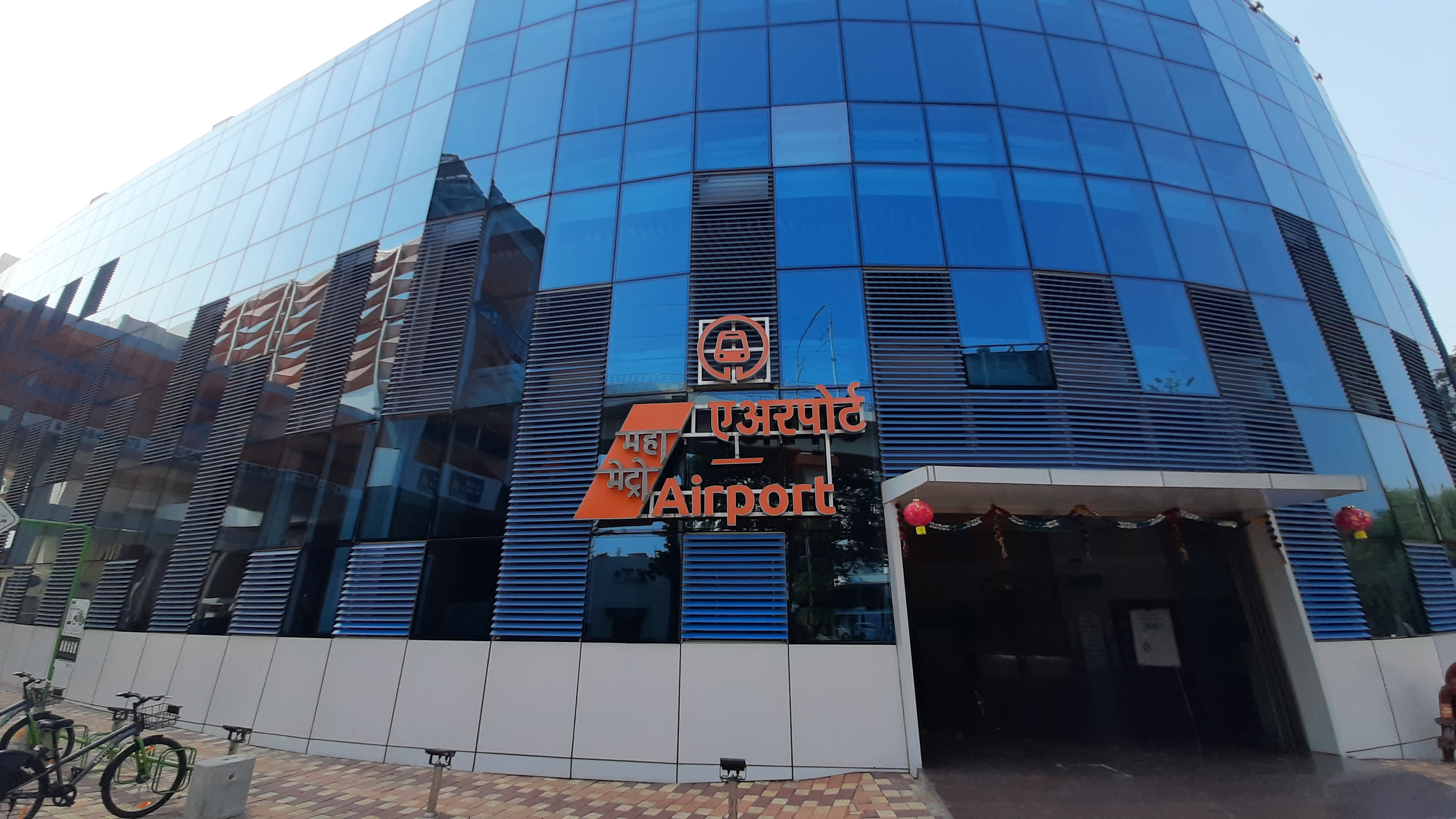
Airport metro station (Nagpur)

On 3 August 2013, a meeting was held at Nagpur by authorities of Ministry for Urban Development to discuss the DPR of Nagpur Metro. In that meeting, the Joint Secretary of MoUD had expressed that the Financial Internal Rate of Return (FIRR) of the project should be at least 8% since the Ministry had already issued an advisory that FIRR of metro project should not be below 8%. On 1 October 2013, a presentation on the DPR was made by NIT to The Chief Minister, Government of Maharashtra. The Chief Minister was of the opinion to avoid underground alignment in MIHAN and also construct Maintenance Depot in the land belonging to State Govt Land.

Subsequently, on 21 October 2013, a joint inspection of the North South corridor was done by MADC, NIT and DMRC. The original alignment of Corridor-I proposed was passing through Khamla Road, Airport Area after Sahakar Nagar and finally was ending at MIHAN. The alignment up to old airport station was elevated, then for a length of 3.30 km (2.05 mi) it was underground with one underground station named as New Airport Station and again elevated in MIHAN Area. Since the cost of underground section of the alignment is much more than the elevated section or the section at grade, alternative alignment was suggested for cost reduction, enhancement in PHPDT and to increase FIRR so that project becomes financially and economically viable. The new proposed alignment suggested in the above inspection, was to pass through a 24-metre (79 ft) wide road adjacent to London Street after Sahakar Nagar Junction and was proposed to be taken to the east along 24-metre (79 ft) wide road and London Street up to Wardha Road. From the intersection at Wardha road, the elevated alignment was proposed to be on the central divider on the Wardha Road. After crossing existing intersection point of Wardha Road & Airport Road, the alignment was to be shifted to the MIHAN area.

Alignment in this portion was proposed to be at grade and to run parallel to Wardha Road up to ROB and abutting railway line thereafter up-to proposed Car depot. But, while working on this modification of alignment, it was noticed that a very large number of properties were falling along the alignment due to sharp curve at the junction of Sahakar Nagar & 24-metre (79 ft) wide road and also at the junction of 24-meter wide road & Wardha Road. As acquiring of these properties will be very tough and may delay the whole project, hence to avoid all such situation, it was decided to take the alignment on Wardha Road only without going on Khamla Road. This decision changed the alignment, and it was decided that North-South Corridor will pass through Wardha Road after Congress Nagar Metro Station. After crossing existing intersection point of Wardha Road & Airport Road, it was decided that the alignment will be shifted to the MIHAN area and alignment in this portion would be at grade and will run parallel to Wardha Road up to ROB and parallel to railway line thereafter up-to proposed Car Depot. A 14-metre (46 ft) wide stretch of land between the railway boundary line and the road near proposed Container Depot of Container Corporation of India Ltd. would be affected by this proposed alignment of the Metro Rail as the proposed alignment passes through this stretch of land. MADC land of area 73 ha (180 acres) was available on the west side of railway line and south of existing flyover near Khapri station. Average width of this land was about 80 m (262 ft) and was about 1,800 m (5,906 ft) long. This MADC land would be utilised for Car Depot. Similarly, Depot of East-West Corridor had also been shifted to SRPF land near proposed Lokmanya Nagar Metro Station.

This has caused deletion of few earlier proposed metro stations on North-South Corridor and addition of new stations.

==== Conflict with MSRDC ====
As per the plan of east–west corridor of the Nagpur Metro, the route from east side of the Nagpur Railway station passes through the same road as that of the place where the Ram Jhula phase II was under construction. This led to a conflict between MSRDC and NMRCL regarding the position of pillars for their respective projects. Even after several meetings no solution came out. The matter was discussed in the High court of Nagpur Bench during the hearing of a PIL filled by Nagpur Chamber of Commerce Ltd (NCCL) for early completion of Ram Jhula, the six-lane cable-stayed railway over-bridge near Santra Market that was pending since nine years. High Court then directed both the parties to submit their plans to superintendent engineer of Public Works Department (PWD), based in Mumbai. The High Court also urged the Chief Minister to resolve the deadlock over Ram Jhula. In response, Devendra Fadnavis, Chief Minister of Maharashtra, assured that there would be an early resolve on the ongoing conflict between NMRCL and MSRDC. After some meetings between officials of NMRCL and MSRDC, which Chief Minister facilitated, both parties found a solution on the conflict. As per the new plan NMRCL jointly decided with Maharashtra State Road Development Corporation (MSRDC) to lay the metro rail track between two spans of Ramjhula. This alignment, although technically challenging, renders demolition of part of the Indira Gandhi Government Medical College and Hospital (IGGMCH) unnecessary, and will not disturb the Poddareshwar Ram Temple either.

Phase 1 network
Line No.	Line Name	Terminals		Stations	Length (km)	Opening date
1	Orange Line	Khapri	Sitabuldi	11	11.87	8 March 2019
1	Orange Line	Sitabuldi	Kasturchand Park	2	1.84	21 August 2021
1	Orange Line	Kasturchand Park	Automotive Square	5	5.85	11 December 2022
2	Aqua Line	Lokmanya Nagar	Sitabuldi	7	10.14	28 January 2020
2	Aqua Line	LAD Square, Bansi Nagar		2	10.14	16 October 2020
2	Aqua Line	Rachana Ring Road Junction, Shankar Nagar Square		2	10.14	9 December 2020
2	Aqua Line	Prajapati Nagar	Sitabuldi	9	8.42	11 December 2022
Total				38	38.22 km (23.75 mi)	

=== Phase 2 ===
Currently, Phase II of Nagpur Metro is under construction and will add 43.8 km to the existing network, connecting areas like Hingna, Kanhan, Butibori MIDC, and Transport Nagar. Civil work, including pier erection and viaduct construction, has already commenced on several stretches. The geotechnical investigation and land acquisition phases have been largely completed, and construction is in full swing across multiple corridors.

Phase III of Nagpur Metro is a proposed 11.5 km corridor from Sitabuldi to Koradi, planned under the ₹25,567 crore Comprehensive Mobility Plan. The corridor, which branches at Kasturchand Park station, will feature both elevated and underground sections—marking the city's first underground metro stretch. It is expected to serve around 1.47 lakh daily commuters by 2054. A second 25 km corridor from Mankapur Chowk to Rachana Junction along the Inner Ring Road is also planned, initially for electric buses, with potential future upgrade to a metro corridor.

==== Detailed Project Report ====
Maharashtra Metro Rail Corporation in early 2018 had started plans for Phase II of Nagpur Metro by appointing RITES to prepare detailed project report for future routes. The DPR was to submitted by April 2018 but got delayed. RITES in the DPR had envisioned five routes for metro rail. Two routes were in the north–south corridor from Automotive Square to Kanhan River having length of 13 km (8.08 mi) with 12 stations and from MIHAN to MIDC ESR having length of 18.50 km (11.50 mi) with 10 stations. Two routes in the east–west corridor from Lokmanya Nagar to Hingna having length of 6.70 km (4.16 mi) and 7 stations and from Prajapati Nagar to Transport Nagar having length 5.60 km (3.48 mi) with 3 stations. A new route was also proposed from Wasudeo Nagar to Dattawadi having length of 4.50 km (2.80 mi) with 3 stations.

The DPR was submitted to the Urban Development Department (UDD) of the Government of Maharashtra in July 2018 by Maharashtra Metro Rail Corporation which was approved in January 2019 by the State Government and in December 2022 by the Government of India.

==== Metro Rail Expenditure ====
The State Government has approved a revised project cost of ₹6,708 crore (equivalent to ₹73 billion or US$780 million in 2026) for the Phase II.

The Phase II is proposed to be funded with ₹3,122 crore (US$330 million) from Government of Maharashtra & Government of India in the form of equity and the rest amount of ₹3,586 crore (US$380 million) is proposed to be obtained from Asian Development Bank and European Investment Bank as financial assistance.

Phase 2 network
Line No.	Line Name	Terminals		Stations	Length (km)	Opening date
1	Orange Line	Khapri	MIDC ESR / Butibori	10	18.65	Under Construction
1	Orange Line	Kanhan River	Automotive Square	12	13	Under Construction
2	Aqua Line	Lokmanya Nagar	Hingna	7	6.65	Under Construction
2	Aqua Line	Prajapati Nagar	Transport Nagar	3	5.5	Under Construction
Total				32	43.8 km (27.2 mi)	

== Lines ==
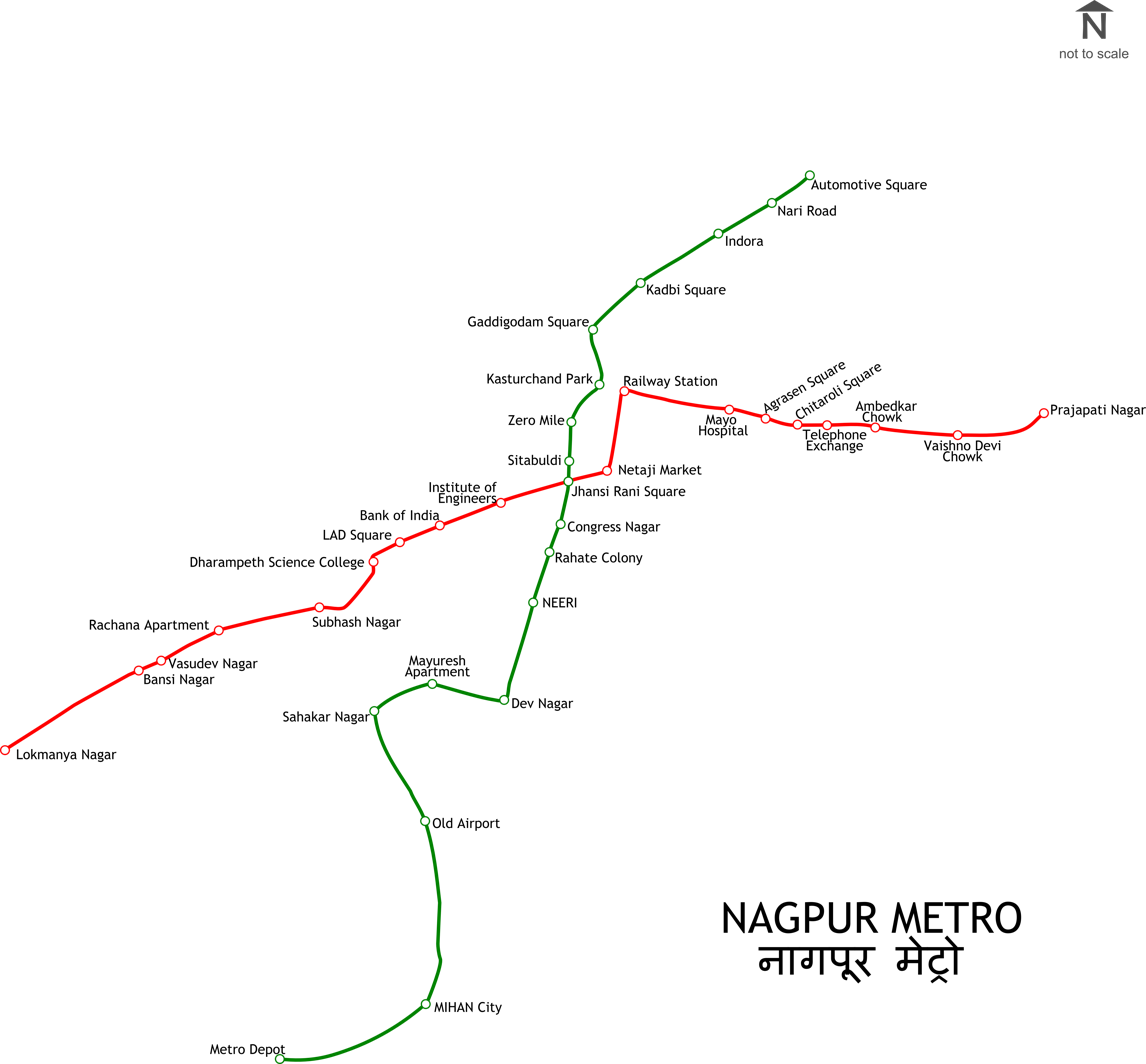
Nagpur Metro rail map

=== Orange Line (Line 1) ===
North-South Corridor (Rail Length: 22.293 km (13.852 mi); No of Stations: 20)

This corridor originates from Automotive Square on Kamptee Road; moves along Kamptee Road and reaches the intersection point of Amravati Road and Wardha Road, then after crossing fly over moves towards Munje Square, moves towards Dhantoli and along the nala moves towards Empire/Dr Munje Marg, leads towards Congress Nagar T-Point, then on Rahate Colony Road and then falls on Wardha Road, leads towards NEERI, then moves along Wardha Road and then west of Railway Track in MIHAN area. And passes through 14 m (46 ft) wide stretch of land between the railway boundary line and the road near proposed Container Depot.

The entire length (22.293 km (13.852 mi)) of this corridor was proposed to be elevated except in 4.6 km (2.858 mi) at grade after Airport Station and in MIHAN area near Khapri Railway Station. There are 20 stations on this corridor of which 15 stations are elevated and 5 stations are at Grade. Sitaburdi Station is an inter-change station. Average inter-station distance is 1.20 km (0.746 mi) approximately varying from 0.54 km (0.336 mi) to 2.40 km (1.491 mi) depending upon the site, operational and traffic requirements.

This line initially started operations partially between Sitabuldi to Khapri since 8 March 2019.

=== Aqua Line (Line 2) ===
East-West Corridor (Rail Length:19.407 km (12.059 mi); No of Stations: 20)

This corridor originates from Prajapati Nagar and runs westwards, through Vaishnodevi Square, Ambedkar Square, Telephone Exchange, Chittar Oli Square, Agrasen Square, Doser Vaisya Square, Nagpur Railway Station, Sitaburdi, Jhansi Rani Square, Institute of Engineers, Shankar Nagar Square, LAD Square, Dharampeth College, Subhash Nagar, Rachna (Ring road Junction), Vasudev Nagar, Bansi Nagar to Lokmanya Nagar. The entire corridor is elevated.

The total length of the corridor is 19.407 kilometres (12.059 mi). There are 20 stations on this corridor. All stations are elevated stations and Sitaburdi station is an Interchange Station. Average inter-station distance is 1.00 km (0.62 mi) approximately varying from 0.65 km (0.40 mi) to 1.29 km (0.80 mi) depending upon the site, operational and traffic requirements.

The DMRC in its Detailed Project Report (DPR) submitted to Nagpur Improvement Trust has suggested to start the construction work on both the routes simultaneously contradicting the prior suggestion of phase wise development.

This line initially started operations partially between Sitabuldi to Lokmanya Nagar since 28 January 2020. Nagpur Metro crossed 10 crore cumulative riders in July 2025 since the commencement of operations in 2019.

== Network ==
Nagpur Metro
Line No.	Line Name	Terminals		First operational	Last extension	Stations	Length
1	Orange	Automotive Square	Khapri	8 March 2019	11 December 2022	18	19.658 km (12.215 mi)
2	Aqua	Prajapati Nagar	Lokmanya Nagar	28 January 2020	11 December 2022	20	18.557 km (11.531 mi)
Total						37	38.215 km (23.746 mi)

== Status updates ==
- November 2013: Detailed Project Report final version submitted.
- August 2014: Union Cabinet approved the project.

=== Orange Line: North-South Corridor ===
- November 2015: Work started on construction of depot.
- January 2016: Work started on Wardha Road.
- August 2016: Work started on Ajni road. (near Ajni railway station).
- September 2016: Work started on back side of Nagpur railway station.
- October 2016: Work started Near Ambazari Lake.
- October 2016: Work started on Sitabuldi Interchange Station (Munje Square).
- December 2016: Work started for Construction of Depot at MIHAN on the N-S Corridor.
- January 2017: Work Started on Zero Mile Station.
- August 2017: Trial run started till Airport Station.
- September 2017: First trial run was conducted on a 5.6 km section between MIHAN area and Khapri station.
- April 2018: Second and Final inspection of CMRS for clearance.
- December 2018: Work progressing in all sections but Metro may miss March 2019 deadline.
- January 2019: The first metro train from China reached metro depot in Nagpur.
- February 2019: Trial run begins.
- February 2019: Prime Minister is expected to inaugurate 12.5 km (7.8 mi) long Phase-1 section from Sitabuldi to Khapri in first week for March 2019.
- 3 March 2019: CMRS inspection carried out.
- 5 March 2019: Prime Minister to inaugurate 13 km (8.1 mi) long Sitabuldi to Khapri section on 8 March 2019.
- 8 March 2019: Prime Minister Narendra Modi inaugurated metro between Sitabuldi to Khapri via video conferencing.
- August 2021: Maharashtra Chief Minister Uddhav Thackeray inaugurated a 1.6 km expansion between Sitabuldi and Kasturchand Park.
- 11 December 2022: Prime Minister Narendra Modi inaugurated the rest of the section of the Orange Line of Nagpur Metro phase I.

=== Aqua Line: East-West Corridor ===
- December 2016: Work started on East-West Corridor.
- August 2019: A trial run from Subhash Nagar to Sitabuldi was held on 15 August 2019. CMRS inspection to be held on 30 August 2019 and metro on Aqua Line to start in September 2019.
- September 2019: Inauguration of Aqua line by Prime Minister Narendra Modi got postponed due to heavy rains. Inauguration to happen after 2019 Maharashtra Legislative Assembly election in October 2019.
- 28 January 2020: CM Uddhav Thackeray and few Union Ministers inaugurated the commercial services on metro between Sitabuldi to Lokmanya Nagar via video conferencing.
- 11 December 2022: Prime Minister Narendra Modi inaugurated the rest of the section of the Aqua Line of Nagpur Metro phase I.

== Nagpur Metro MAHA Card ==
State Bank of India and Maharashtra Metro Rail Corporation Limited (MMRCL) has introduced Metro MAHA Card Service to metro passengers.

Through this Metro card service, passengers can travel without the hassle of being in the ticket queue. An EVM chip based card can be recharged in a range of Rs.100 to Rs.2000 and in multiples of 100. Metro passengers can get 10% off on their fares if transactions are made through cards.

== See also ==
- Urban rail transit in India
  - Maharashtra Metro Rail Corporation
    - Pune Metro
