= Maha Metro =

Metro rail corporation in Maharashtra, India

Maharashtra Metro Rail Corporation Limited
- Trade name: Maha Metro
- Type: Public sector
- Industry: Public transport
- Predecessor: Nagpur Metro Rail Corporation Limited
- Headquarters: Metro House, Bunglow No. 28/2, Anand Nagar, C. K. Naidu Road, Civil Lines, Nagpur, Maharashtra, India
- Area served: Maharashtra
- Key people: Shravan Hardikar, MD
- Services: Nagpur Metro; Pune Metro
- Owners: Govt of India (50%); Govt of Maharashtra (50%)
- Website: MahaMetro

Maharashtra Metro Rail Corporation Limited (operating as Maha Metro) is a 50:50 joint venture company of the Government of India and Government of Maharashtra headquartered in Nagpur, India.

The existing Nagpur Metro Rail Corporation Limited (NMRCL) was reconstituted into Maha Metro for implementation of all Maharashtra state metro projects, except the Mumbai Metropolitan Region.

The project will be covered under the legal framework of the Metro Railways (Construction of Works) Act, 1978; the Metro Railways (Operation and Maintenance) Act, 2002; and the Railways Act, 1989, as amended from time to time.

== Operation ==
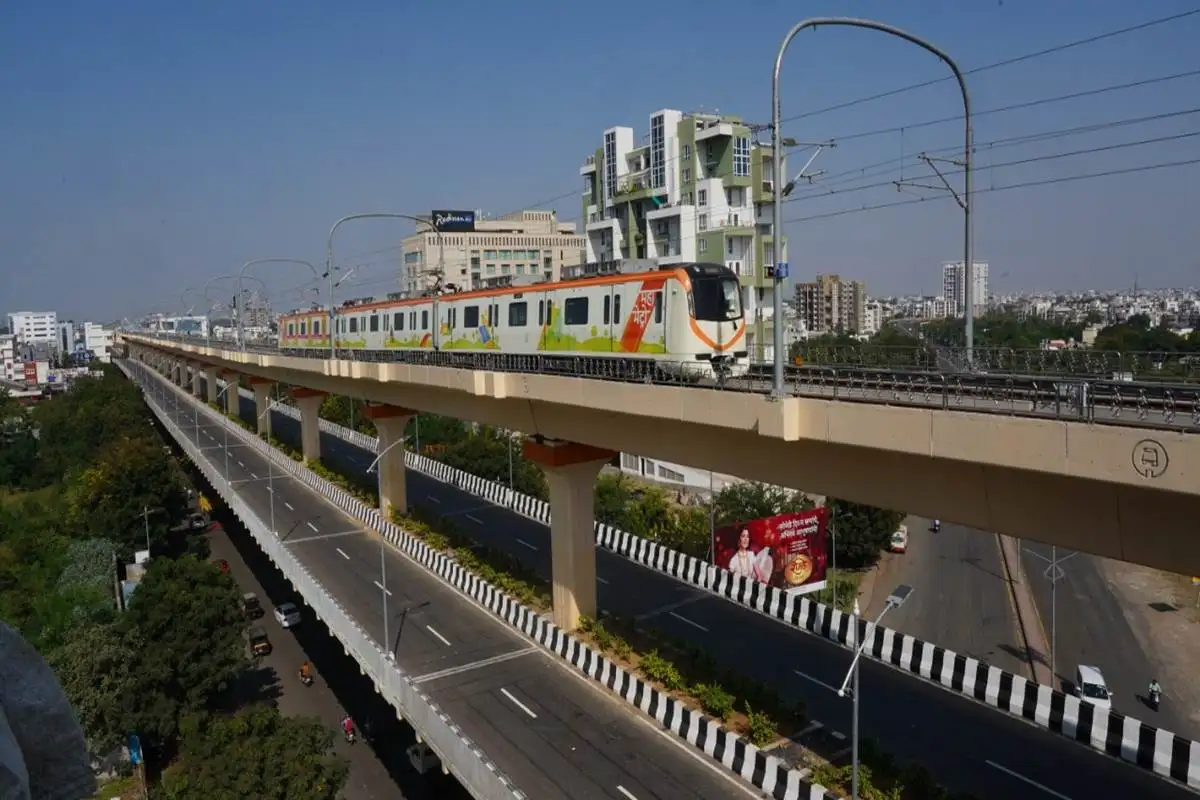
Nagpur Metro

Maha Metro is responsible for all the metro rail projects in Maharashtra except the Mumbai Metropolitan Area. It is the implementation authority for the Nagpur Metro and Pune Metro projects, except lines that will be handled by the PMRDA.

The upcoming Greater Nasik Metro and Thane Metro will be also implemented and operated by Maha Metro.

== Systems ==
=== Operational Systems ===
As of 11 October 2026

List of current operational systems in Maharashtra
System	Locale	Lines operational	Stations	Length		Opened	Annual ridership (in millions)
System	Locale	Lines operational	Stations	Operational	Under construction	Opened	Annual ridership (in millions)
Nagpur Metro	Nagpur	2	37	38.22 km (23.75 mi)	43.00 km (26.72 mi)	8 March 2019	33.88 (2024^{*}) (Note: Figure extrapolated from 75,000 average daily ridership figures over a year as mentioned in the cited report)
Pune Metro	Pune Metropolitan Region	2	28	31.25 km (19.42 mi)*	11.08 km (6.88 mi)*	6 March 2022	67.10* (2025)
Total		4	65	69.47 km (43.17 mi)	54.08 km (33.60 mi)	—N/a	100.98 million

Table note

^* Indicates ridership figures based on the fiscal year rather than the calendar year.

* MahaMetro Only (excluding PMRDA lines)

=== Systems in development ===
As of 6 October 2026

Under construction
Centre approved DPR
Central DPR appraisal
Centre rejected DPR
State approved DPR
DPR submitted
DPR under preparation
On hold

System	Locale	Length		Construction began	Planned opening
System	Locale	Under construction	Planned	Construction began	Planned opening
Thane Metro	Thane	29.5 km (18.3 mi)		2025	2029
Total		29.5 km (18.3 mi)			
