= Transport in Nagpur =

City in India

The city of Nagpur is strategically located in central India. It has a vast railway network and its road network is well-maintained to avoid congestion. There are 4 modes of transportation in Nagpur (viz. Road, Railway, Air and Metro). Nagpur is connected to India's four major metropolitan areas (Mumbai, Delhi, Kolkata and Chennai) by road, rail and air. Auto rickshaws operate in most parts of the city, and are the main form of hired transport.

== Roads ==
Nagpur is a major road junction, since India's two major national highways (NH 44 from Kanyakumari to Varanasi and NH-6 from Hajira to Kolkota) pass through the city. NH 69 connects Nagpur to Obaidullaganj, near Bhopal. Nagpur is at the junction of two Asian Highways: AH43 (Agra to Matara, Sri Lanka) and AH46 (Kharagpur to Dhule). The Inland Container Depot, run by Container Corporation of India (CONCOR), has been the country's fastest-growing inland port. A shorter highway to Mumbai, a Maharashtra state highway, connects the state capital (Mumbai) to Nagpur via Aurangabad and significantly reduces the distance traveled by NH 6 and NH 3 between the cities.

The National Highways Authority of India approved the extension of NH 204 from Kolhapur to Nagpur via Solapur, Tuljapur, Latur, Nanded, Yavatmal, Wardha and Butibori, which primarily covers the portion covered by the current MSH 3 between Butibori and Tuljapur. The planned NH-26B (Savner-Chhindwara-Narsinghpur) will connect Nagpur to North India.

=== Buses ===
==== Intercity ====
Nagpur is the divisional headquarters of the Maharashtra State Road Transport Corporation (MSRTC), and has one of the state's three bus workshops. The MSRTC has intercity and interstate routes, with two bus stations in Nagpur: Nagpur Bus Sthanak (CBS-1) at Ganeshpeth and Mor Bhawan (CBS-2) at Jhansi Rani Square, Sitabuldi. It operates 1,600 daily long- and short-distance routes from CBS-1 in Maharashtra and surrounding states, and 750 daily short-distance routes from CBS-2 in Vidarbha. Bus service is available to major cities in and around the state, including Bhopal, Indore, Jabalpur, Raipur, Chhindwara, Satna, Rewa, Raipur, Panna, Amravati, Raipur, Jagdalpur, Bilaspur, Mandla, Katni, Pune, Aurangabad, Jalna, Nashik, Mumbai, Nanded, Akola, Jalgaon, Bhusawal, Rajnandgaon, Parbhani and Gondia.

==== City ====
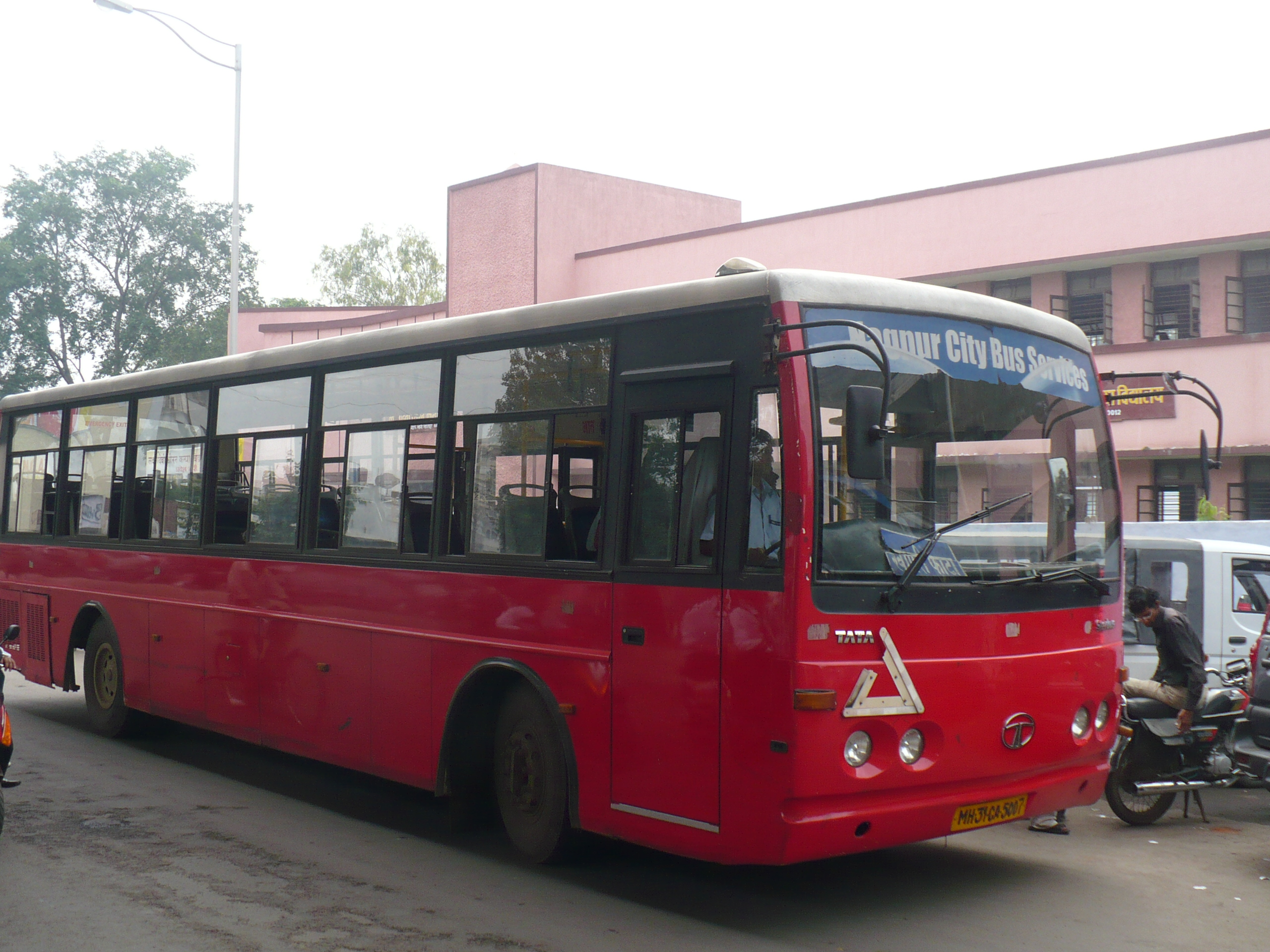
StarBus in Nagpur

Nagpur Mahanagar Parivahan Limited (NMPL) is the company which operates the city's bus service.The Nagpur Municipal Corporation through its bus operators (three red and one green) plies 730 buses, by which over 200,000 people commute.

== Railways ==
Due to its central location, Nagpur is a rail junction connecting India's four major metropolises: Mumbai, Delhi, Chennai, and Kolkata. A total of 242 trains (passenger, express, mail, Duronto, Rajdhani Express and the Garib Rath) stop at Nagpur, one of the country's busiest junctions. Sixty-five are daily trains, and 26 terminate or originate at Nagpur. Almost 150,000 passengers use the Nagpur Junction railway station, the city's main station, daily; smaller stations are at Ajni, Itwari, Kalamna, Kamptee and Khapri. A need has been felt for a Nagpur metro rail service similar to the Delhi Metro, and Larsen and Toubro (L&T) was commissioned to prepare a report on the metropolitan area's transport needs by 2020. In its report, L&T recommended an elevated monorail and a multi-modal transport system similar to Hyderabad's.

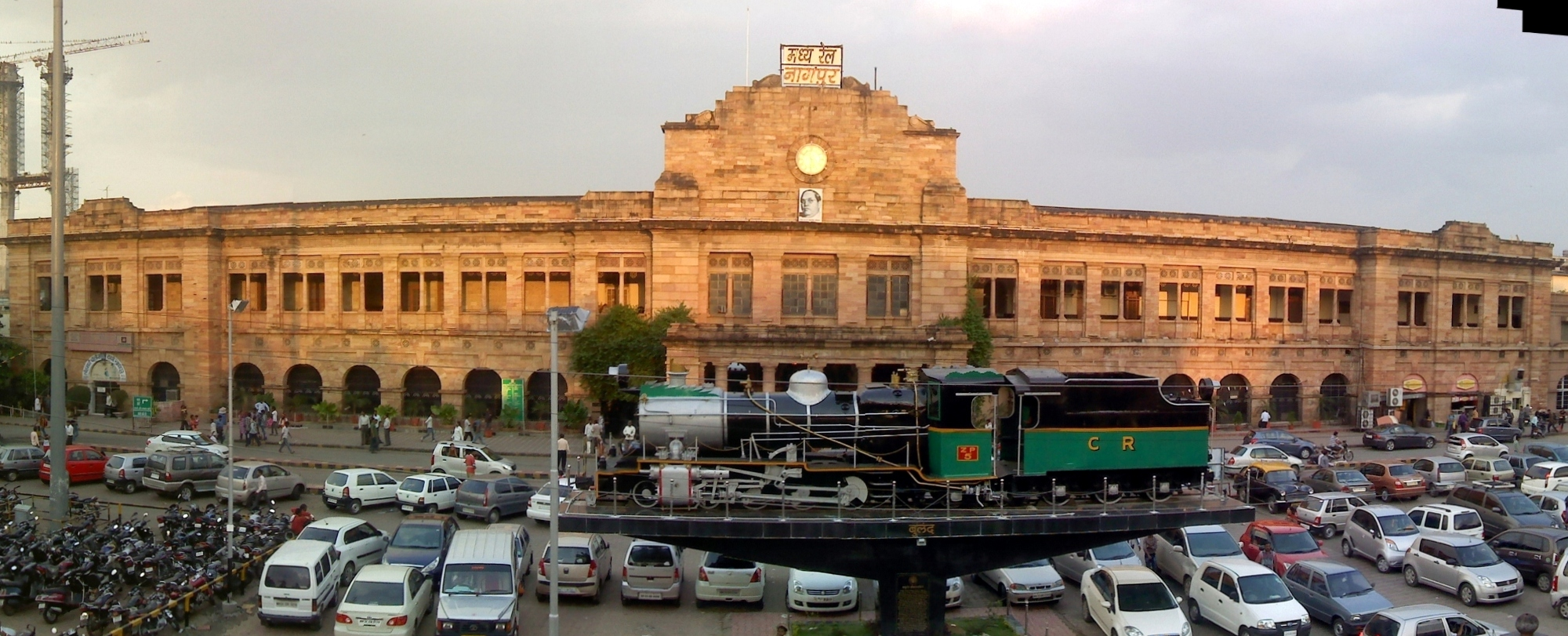
Nagpur Junction railway station

Nagpur Junction (built in 1867) is in the center of the city, at the foot of Sitabuldi Hill which contains the historic fort. It is the headquarters of the Nagpur division of the central and south-eastern lines of Indian Railways. The nearby Ajni station is primarily a cargo terminal. British India opened the Bombay–Bhusawal–Nagpur line in 1867 to link the cotton-growing Vidarbha region with the port city of Bombay. The line was later extended east to Howrah.

The main building is pink sandstone, similar to the colonial-era Reserve Bank of India and Vidhan Bhavan, and is a heritage site. The Ministry of Railways has allocated ₹1 billion to upgrade the station, and a flyover has been built to reduce traffic congestion. The Multi-modal International Cargo Hub and Airport at Nagpur (MIHAN) is under construction, and closed-circuit cameras have been installed at Nagpur Junction.

In addition to Nagpur Junction, local stations are in Itwari, Ajni, Kalamna, Khapri, Godhni, Bharatwada, Gumgaon, Kapmtee, Kanhan, Ramtek and Butibori. Itwari has been converted to a terminus by the South East Central Railway for many passenger and local MEMU trains. Local trains run from Itwari to Nagpur's outlying north, north-east and eastern areas, and the Ramtek-Kanhan-Kamptee-Kalamna-Itwari line is popular with pilgrims. Many passenger trains to Chhindwara, Jabalpur, Raipur, Gondia and Tatanagar originate in Nagpur. The Itwari line is also used by business people from north, north-east and eastern Nagpur.

Ajni, on the Nagpur-Mumbai/Chennai route, is part of the Central Railway zone. Nearly all trains stop briefly at the station, which is used primarily by residents of central, western, south-western and southern Nagpur and short-distance day trippers. Trains terminating at Nagpur are almost 80 percent emptied at Ajni, and trains originating from the city fill about 40 percent there.

== Metro ==
The Nagpur Metro began its operation in March 2019 having a network coverage of 24.5 km with 2 lines and 16 stations. The Nagpur Metro project was announced by the Maharashtra state government, with a cost of ₹4,400 crore (₹44 billion) for a phase-1, 25-km corridor from Sitabuldi to MIHAN and Butibori via Airport, and ₹3,800 crore (₹38 billion) for a 20-km corridor from Sitabuldi to Automotive Square in Kamptee. Consultant Delhi Metro Railway Corporation (DMRC) would study the alignment and submit a detailed project report.

Site inspection began in March 2012 with a Nagpur Improvement Trust (NIT) initiative. The ₹10,000 crore (₹100 billion) project would be built by the Nagpur Metro Rail Corporation, formed under the NIT. The Nagpur Municipal Corporation, the Maharashtra Airport Development Corporation (MADC, developing the Multi-modal International Cargo Hub and Airport at Nagpur, or MIHAN), the Maharashtra Industrial Development Corporation (MIDC) and Maharashtra's City and Industrial Development Corporation (CIDCO) are the other participating organisations. MIHAN's vice-chairman will chair the new company, and NIT chairman Parvin Darade will be its executive director.

== Air transport ==
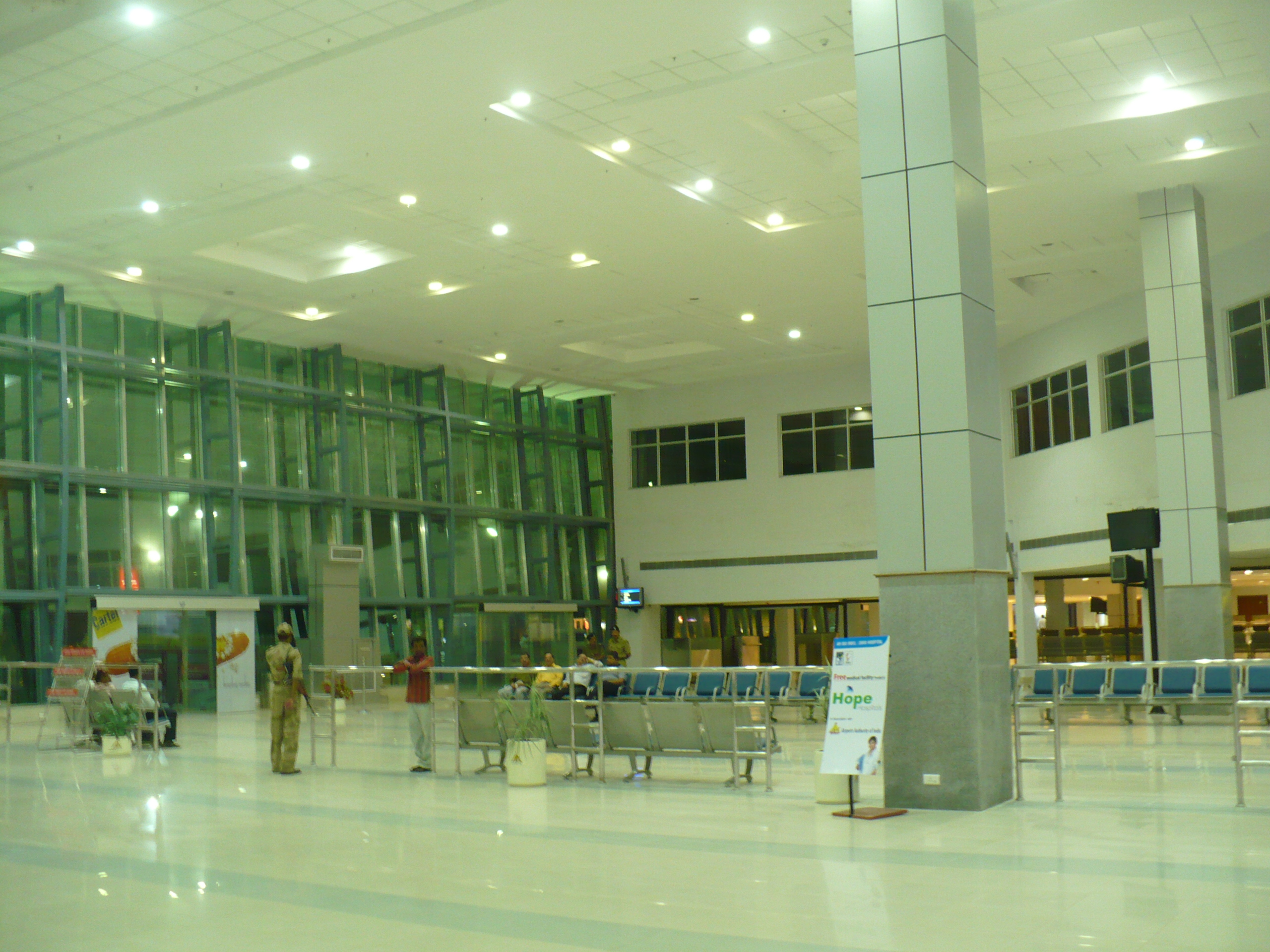
Interior of Dr. Babasaheb Ambedkar International Airport

Nagpur's air traffic control (ATC) which is India's busiest, with more than 300 international flights flying over the city every day in 2004. Domestic airlines IndiGo, Kingfisher Airlines, GoAir, and Air Deccan connect Nagpur with Mumbai (eight flights daily), Delhi (four flights daily), Ahemdabad (two flights daily), Pune (two flights daily), Bangalore (two flights daily), Indore (three flights daily), Hyderabad (three flights daily, and one flight four times a week), Kolkata (one flight daily and one flight twice a week) and Chennai (two flights daily). In October 2005, Nagpur's Sonegaon Airport was declared an international airport and renamed Dr. Babasaheb Ambedkar International Airport. Initial Air Arabia flights between Nagpur and Sharjah intended to tap a strong demand for international travel in Central India. In April 2006, Indian Airlines connected Nagpur and Bangkok with non-stop, twice-weekly service. Qatar Airways began twice-weekly service from Nagpur to Doha, and Air India Express began flying to Dubai three times a week on 24 September 2007.

=== MIHAN ===
The Multi-modal International Cargo Hub and Airport at Nagpur (MIHAN), India's first, was completed on the outskirts of the city in 2006. MIHAN is expected to contribute significantly to the development of Nagpur and the economically-backward Vidarbha region. Another impetus to the budding aviation industry in Nagpur was Boeing's decision to set up a $185-million maintenance base in 2006.
