= Dr. Babasaheb Ambedkar International Airport =

Airport serving Nagpur, Maharashtra, India

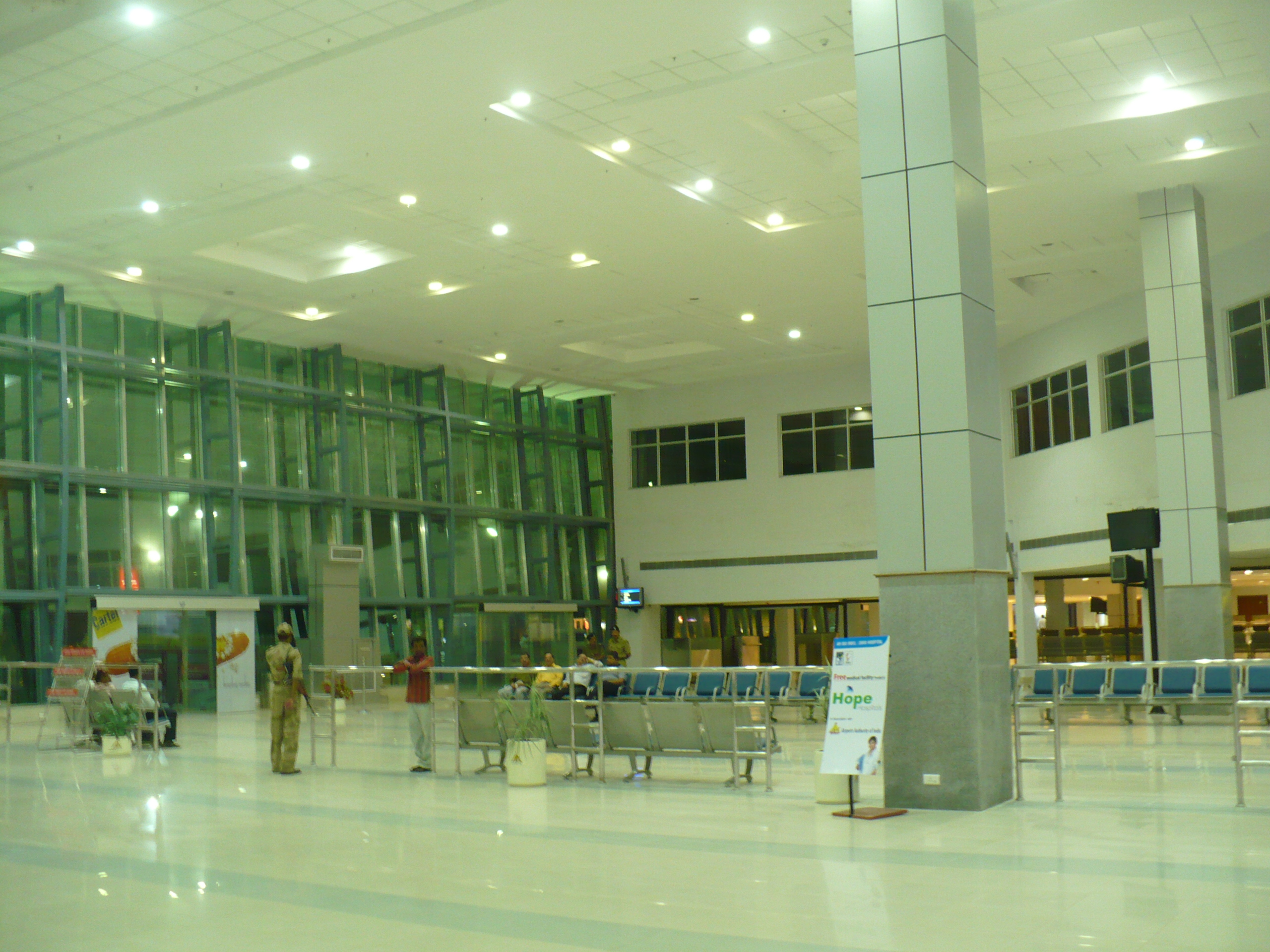
- IATA: NAG; ICAO: VANP; WMO: 42867

Summary
- Airport type: Public
- Owner: Airports Authority of India
- Operator: GMR Group & MIHAN India Private Limited (MIPL)
- Serves: Nagpur
- Location: Sonegaon, Maharashtra, India
- Focus city for: IndiGo
- Elevation AMSL: 315 m (1,033 ft)
- Coordinates: 21°05′32″N 79°02′50″E
- Public transit access: Orange Line Airport metro station
- Website: www.nagpurairport.in

Map
- Location within Maharashtra Location within India

Runways
Direction	Length		Surface
Direction	m	ft	Surface
14/32	3,200	10,498	Asphalt

Statistics (April 2025 - March 2026)
- Passengers: 30,07,734 (▲3.9%)
- Aircraft movements: 23,771 (▼0.4%)
- Cargo tonnage: 9,399.6 (▲4.2%)
- Source: AAI

Dr. Babasaheb Ambedkar International Airport (IATA: NAG, ICAO: VANP) is an international airport serving the city of Nagpur, Maharashtra, India, the state's winter capital city. The airport is located at Sonegaon, 8 km (5 mi) southwest of Nagpur. The airport covers an area of 1,355 acres (548 hectares). In 2005, it was named after B. R. Ambedkar, an important figure in the drafting of the Constitution of India and one of the founding fathers of the Republic of India.

The airport handled around 2.9 million passengers in financial year 2024-25, making it the 27th-busiest airport in India. The airport handles around 8,000 passengers per day and caters to four domestic airlines and two international airlines connecting Nagpur to Sharjah, Doha, and 14 domestic destinations. The airport is also home to Nagpur Air Force Station of the Indian Air Force. Growth in passenger traffic is fuelled by passengers traveling to and from the state capital Mumbai, located over 700 km (378 mi) away and the national capital Delhi. The airport has one terminal and has two aerobridges.

== History ==
The airport was commissioned during the First World War in 1917-18 for the RFC/RAF. The old buildings were renovated during the Second World War, when it was used as a staging airfield by the Royal Air Force (RAF). It was transferred to the Indian Government when the British left. Due to brisk traffic, new terminal buildings featuring facilities of refreshment, retiring rooms, restrooms, book stalls and visitor's galleries were constructed in 1953.

Sonegaon Airport was the hub of the unique "Night Air Mail Service" wherein four planes left from Delhi, Bombay, Calcutta and Madras every night with a mail load from their region and returned to their home base in the early morning, after exchanging the mail at Nagpur. The service was operated from January 1949 until October 1973. Over the years its major traffic was civilian aircraft till the formation of 44 Wing and the transfer of the Il-76 military transport aircraft of the IAF in 2003. In the 2010s, the airport was in danger of losing its operating license due to danger at the airport. A former Atlanta Skylarks Boeing 720 owned by Continental Aviation Limited, which had been abandoned at the airport since 1991, was sitting 90 meters from the runway, when the rules state that any object should be situated at least 150 meters from the runway. In 2015–2016, the aircraft, which by then had been standing there for nearly 30 years, was moved to the northeast end of the airport, 600 meters away from the runway.

=== Expansion ===
It is slated to be the Multimodal International Hub Airport and development work started in 2005. The plan involves the construction of a second runway, a new terminal building and a cargo complex through a build-operate-transfer basis. The Maharashtra government offered 400 hectares of land to the Indian Air Force (IAF) in exchange of 278 hectares of land occupied by Air Force Station, Nagpur.

The existing Integrated Terminal Building was inaugurated on 14 April 2008. The Airports Authority of India (AAI) modified and upgraded the existing building at the cost of ₹790 million (US$8.4 million). It covers an area of 17,500 square metres and has the capacity to handle 550 arriving and departing passengers during peak hours. The existing terminal building has 20 check-in counters and 20 immigration counters. The terminal is equipped with facilities such as passenger bridges with visual docking guidance system and baggage conveyor system. A car park to accommodate 600 cars at a time has been built. Eight new parking bays were added to take the number of bays to 18. For improving city-side connectivity, a new approach road to connect the terminal building with the main highway has been constructed. To improve the navigation facilities at Nagpur Airport, AAI plans to construct a new control tower and technical block with all modern CNS ATM facilities.

=== Air India maintenance-repair-overhaul ===
A maintenance-repair-overhaul facility, built by the American aircraft manufacturer Boeing, occupies 50 acres of land at the airport. Construction began in January 2011. Air India's maintenance-repair-overhaul unit, called Air India Engineering Services, which was hived into a separate company in 2013, will start operating the maintenance-repair-overhaul facility by June 2015. The $100 million project is part of a deal between Air India and Boeing and has two 100 x 100-metre hangars, constructed by Larsen & Toubro, to accommodate wide-body aircraft like Boeing 777 and 787-8 and another 24,000 sq metres area for allied work. Nagpur was chosen for the project because of its central location and its high temperatures, favourable for aircraft manufacturing, as they are away from corrosion and sea water contamination. The greenfield project is Boeing's second in the world after Shanghai in China.

=== Metro Access from Airport ===
The airport now has access to Nagpur Metro via feeder bus services operating at an interval of 15 minutes between the airport and Airport metro station.

== Airlines and destinations ==
Airlines	Destinations
Air Arabia	Sharjah
Air India	Delhi, Mumbai
Air India Express	Bengaluru, Mumbai
IndiGo	Ahmedabad, Bengaluru, Delhi, Goa–Mopa, Hyderabad, Indore, Kolkata, Mumbai–Navi, Mumbai, Pune
Qatar Airways	Doha
Star Air	Kishangarh, Nanded

== Statistics ==
Busiest domestic routes from NAG (2023-24)
Rank	Airport	Carriers	Departing passengers
1	Mumbai, Maharashtra	Air India, IndiGo	360,677
2	Delhi	Air India, IndiGo	266,718
3	Pune, Maharashtra	IndiGo, Star Air	205,538
4	Bengaluru, Karnataka	IndiGo, Star Air	180,556
5	Kolkata, West Bengal	IndiGo	67,975
6	Goa	IndiGo	61,400
7	Ahmedabad, Gujarat	IndiGo	49,725
8	Hyderabad, Telangana	IndiGo	45,896
9	Indore, Madhya Pradesh	IndiGo	36,727
10	Lucknow, Uttar Pradesh	Star Air	23,076

Busiest international routes from NAG (2023–24)
Rank	Airport	Carriers	Departing passengers
1	Doha, Qatar	Qatar Airways	36,038
2	Sharjah, United Arab Emirates	Air Arabia	15,790

== See also ==
- Transport in Nagpur
- Airports in India
- List of busiest airports in India by passenger traffic
