= Buti Bori railway station =

Railway Station in Maharashtra, India

Buti Bori बुटी बोरी
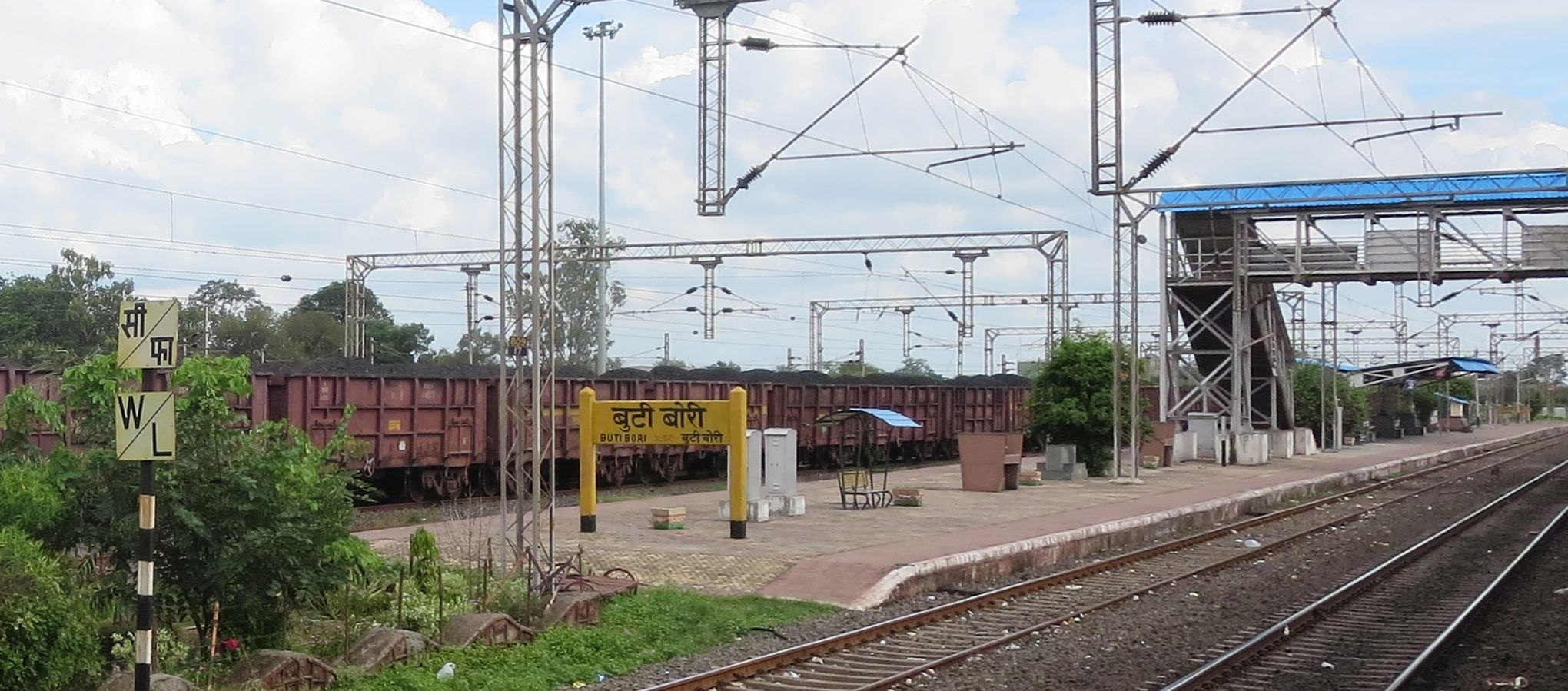
- Indian Railways logo

General information
- Location: Butibori, Nagpur, Maharashtra; India
- Coordinates: 20.9185°N 79.0133°E
- Elevation: 269 metres (883 ft)
- System: Passenger train station
- Owner: Indian Railways
- Operator: Central Railway zone
- Lines: Howrah–Nagpur–Mumbai line New Delhi–Chennai main line Nagpur–Hyderabad line
- Platforms: 2
- Tracks: Broad gauge 1,676 mm (5 ft 6 in)

Construction
- Structure type: At Ground
- Parking: Available
- Cycle facilities: Available

Other information
- Status: Functioning
- Station code: BTBR
- Zone(s): Central Railway zone
- Division(s): Nagpur CR
Location

Buti Bori is a local urban rail station at Butibori, an industrial suburb of Nagpur in Maharashtra.

== Location ==
It is situated 28 km from Nagpur Junction.

== Gallery ==
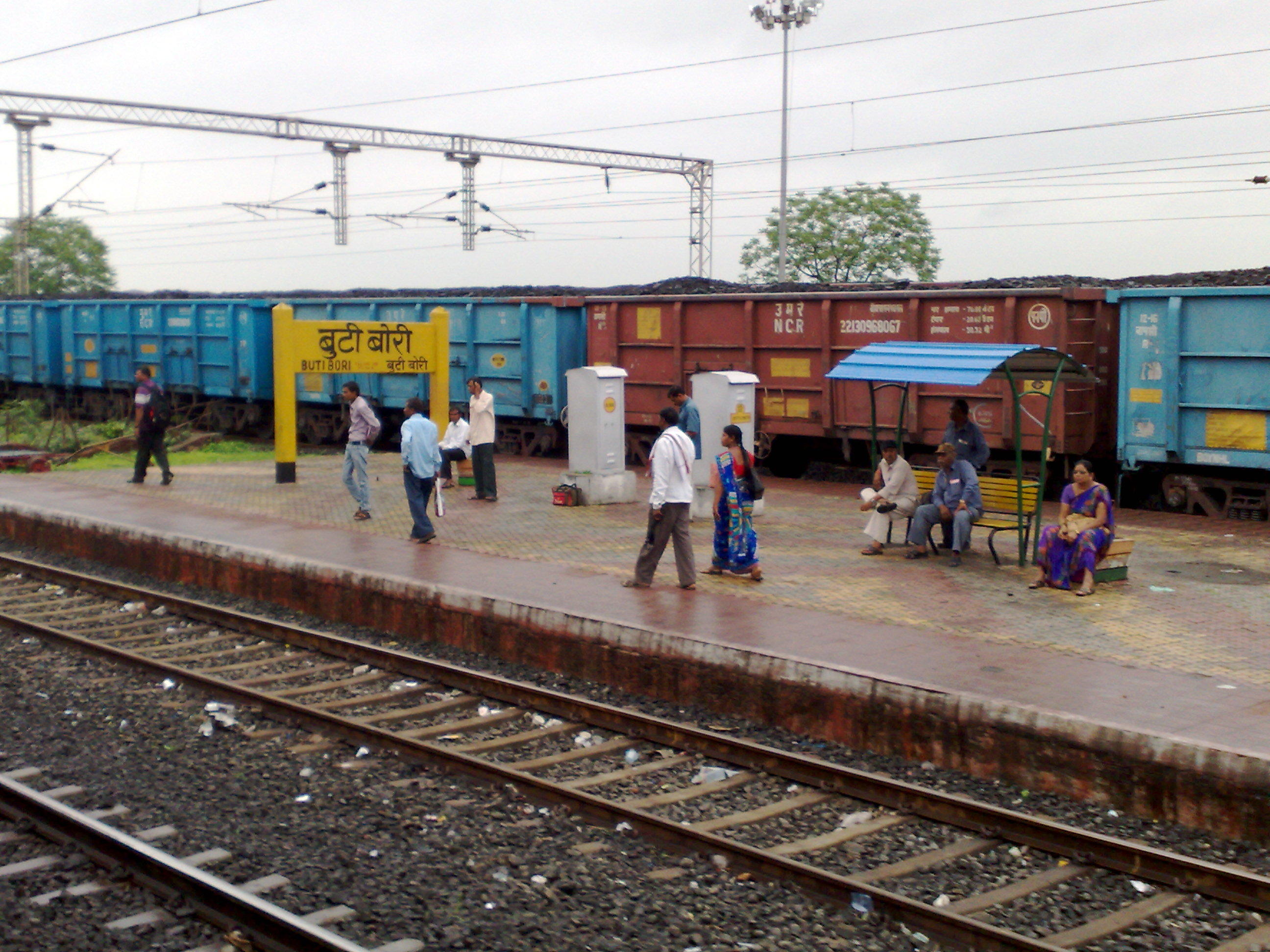
Buti Bori railway station
