= Butibori Municipal Council =

Butibori Municipal Council Maharashtra

Type
- Type: Municipal Council of the Butibori

History
- Founded: 11-May-2018

Leadership
- Mayor: Sumit Shankarrao Mendhe, Gondwana Ganatantra Party
- Seats: 21

Elections
- Last election: 02-December-2025

Butibori is the Municipal council in district of Nagpur, Maharashtra.

== History ==
Butibori is a Municipal Council city in district of Nagpur, Maharashtra.

== Municipal Council election ==
=== Electoral performance 2019 ===
S.No.	Party name	Alliance	Party flag or symbol	No. of Corporators
01	Shiv Sena (SS)	NDA		04
02	Bharatiya Janata Party (BJP)	NDA		14
03	Indian National Congress (INC)	UPA		00
04	Nationalist Congress Party (INC)	UPA		00

=== Electoral performance 2025 ===
S.No.	Party name	Alliance	Party flag or symbol	No. of Corporators
01	Gondwana Gantantra Party (GGP)	BPA		17
02	Shiv Sena (SS)	NDA		00
03	Bharatiya Janata Party (BJP)	NDA		04
04	Indian National Congress (INC)	UPA		00
