= Mumbai CSMT–Nagpur Duronto Express =

Train in India

Mumbai CSMT – Nagpur Junction Duronto Express
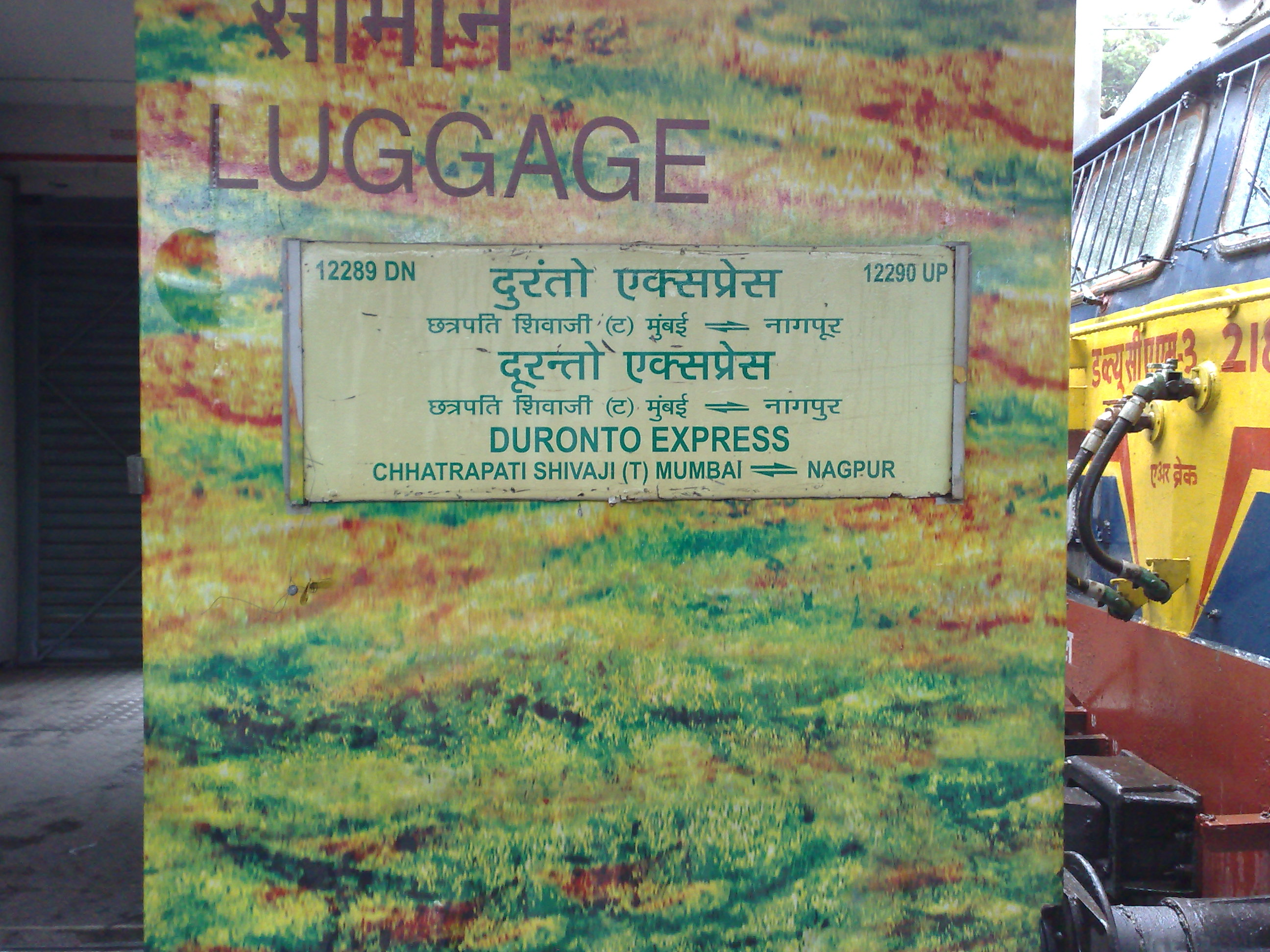

Overview
- Service type: Duronto Express
- Locale: Maharashtra
- First service: 24 November 2009
- Current operator: Central Railways

Route
- Termini: Nagpur Junction; Chhatrapati Shivaji Maharaj Terminus
- Stops: 5
- Distance travelled: 835 km (519 mi)
- Average journey time: 11 hours
- Service frequency: Daily Service
- Train number: 12289 / 12290

On-board services
- Classes: AC 1st Class, AC 2 Tier, AC 3 Tier, Sleeper Class
- Seating arrangements: No
- Sleeping arrangements: Yes
- Catering facilities: No
- Observation facilities: LHB rake

Technical
- Rolling stock: LHB Coach
- Track gauge: 1,676 mm (5 ft 6 in)
- Operating speed: 74.40 km/h (46.23 mph) average with halts

The 12289 / 12290 Mumbai CSMT–Nagpur Duronto Express is a Superfast Express train which belongs to Central Railway zone that runs between Mumbai CSMT and Nagpur Junction of Maharashtra in India.

== Stoppages ==
Being a Duronto Express, it does not stop at any other station in between. However it does stop at Bhusawal Junction as a technical Halt. It also stops at Igatpuri and Kasara for removal and addition of banker engines. But from 1 January 2016 all/some technical halts are converted to commercial halt. Thus tickets are issued from Nagpur, Bhusaval, Igatpuri and Mumbai.

== Locomotive ==
Previously, a WCAM 2/2P or WCAM 3 used to haul the train from Mumbai Chhatrapati Shivaji Maharaj Terminus to Igatpuri (technical halt) following which it got either a WAP 4 of Bhusawal Electric Loco Shed or WAP 7 of Ajni Electric Loco Shed.

With Central Railway completing the change over of 1500 V DC traction to 25,000 V AC traction on 6 June 2015, this train is now hauled end to end by Ajni-based WAP 7.

== Coach composition ==
The coach composition of the Nagpur Duronto leaving NGP is as follows:-

WAP7-EOG-AB1-H1-A1-A2-B1-B2-B3-B4-S1-S2-S3-S4-S5-S6-S7-S8-EOG.

The train also runs with 24 coaches having extra 3-Tier coaches added on seasonal basis & as per demand.

From 23 February 2019, this train now runs with pure LHB coaches.

== Coach positioning ==
Coach Positioning of this train at Mumbai CSMT Station is:

LOCO-EOG-S6-S5-S4-S3-S2-S1-B12-B11-B10-B9-B8-B7-B6-B5-B4-B3-B2-B1-A3-A2-A1-H1-EOG

Vice Versa Coach positioning at Nagpur Junction

== Other trains on the Nagpur-Mumbai Route ==
Jnaneswari Express, Samarsata Express, Gitanjali Express, Kolkata Mail via Nagpur, Vidarbha Express, Sewagram Express, Shalimar Express and some other trains ply on this route with travel time varying from 16 hours to 13 hours. However the Nagpur Duronto is the fastest option for this route as it manages to connect the two cities in just 11 hrs.

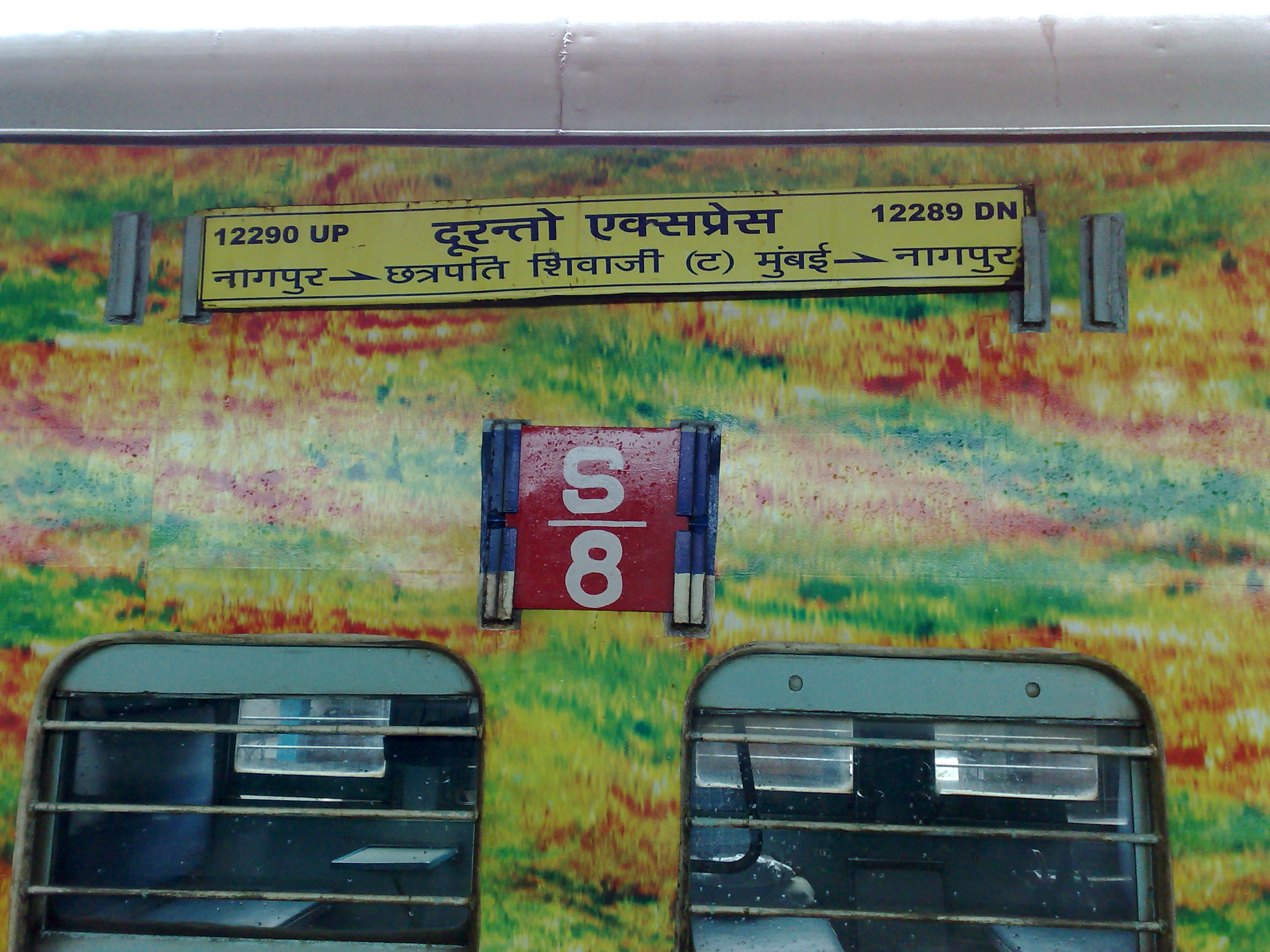

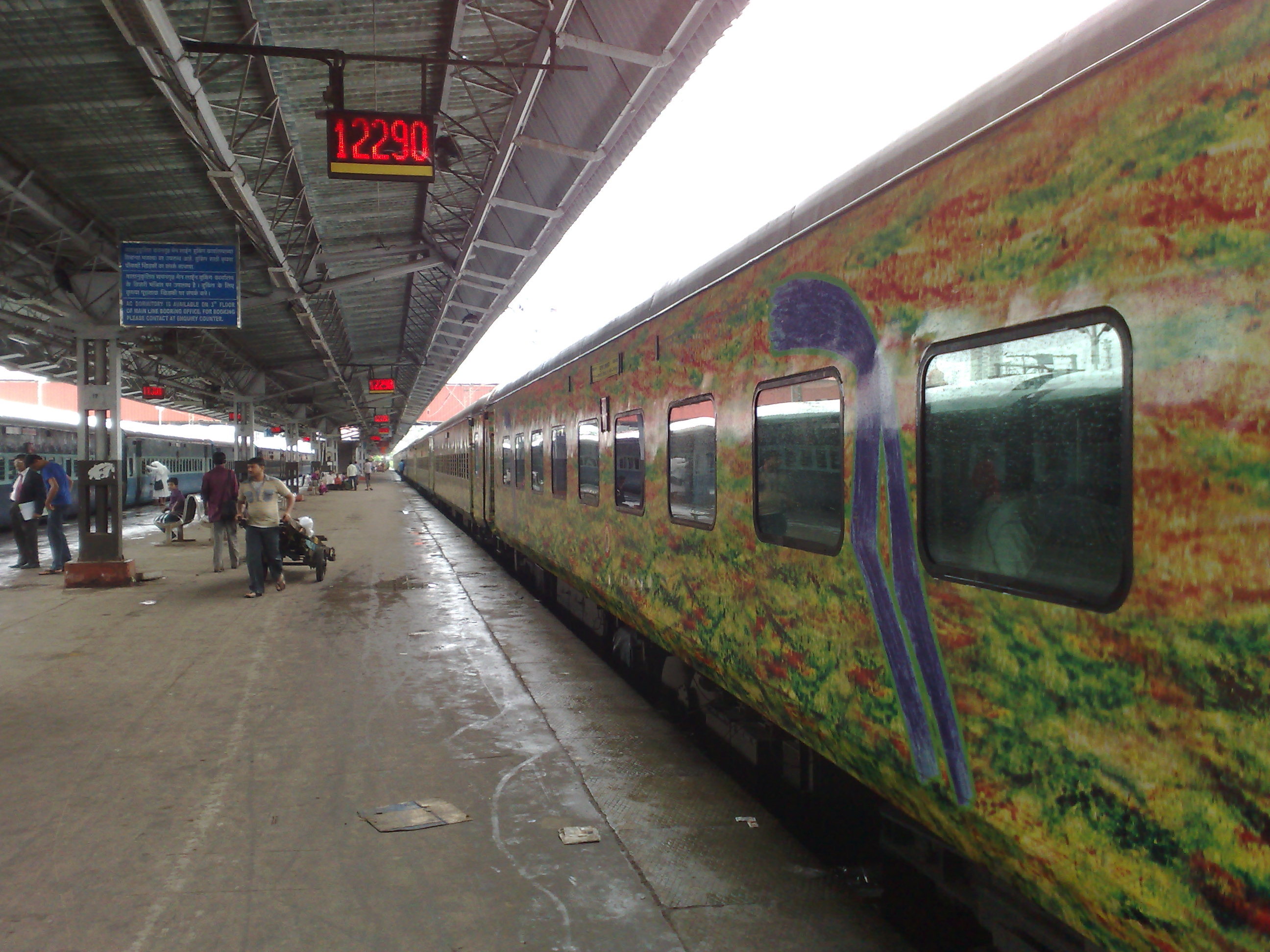
12290 Nagpur Duronto Express at Mumbai CST station

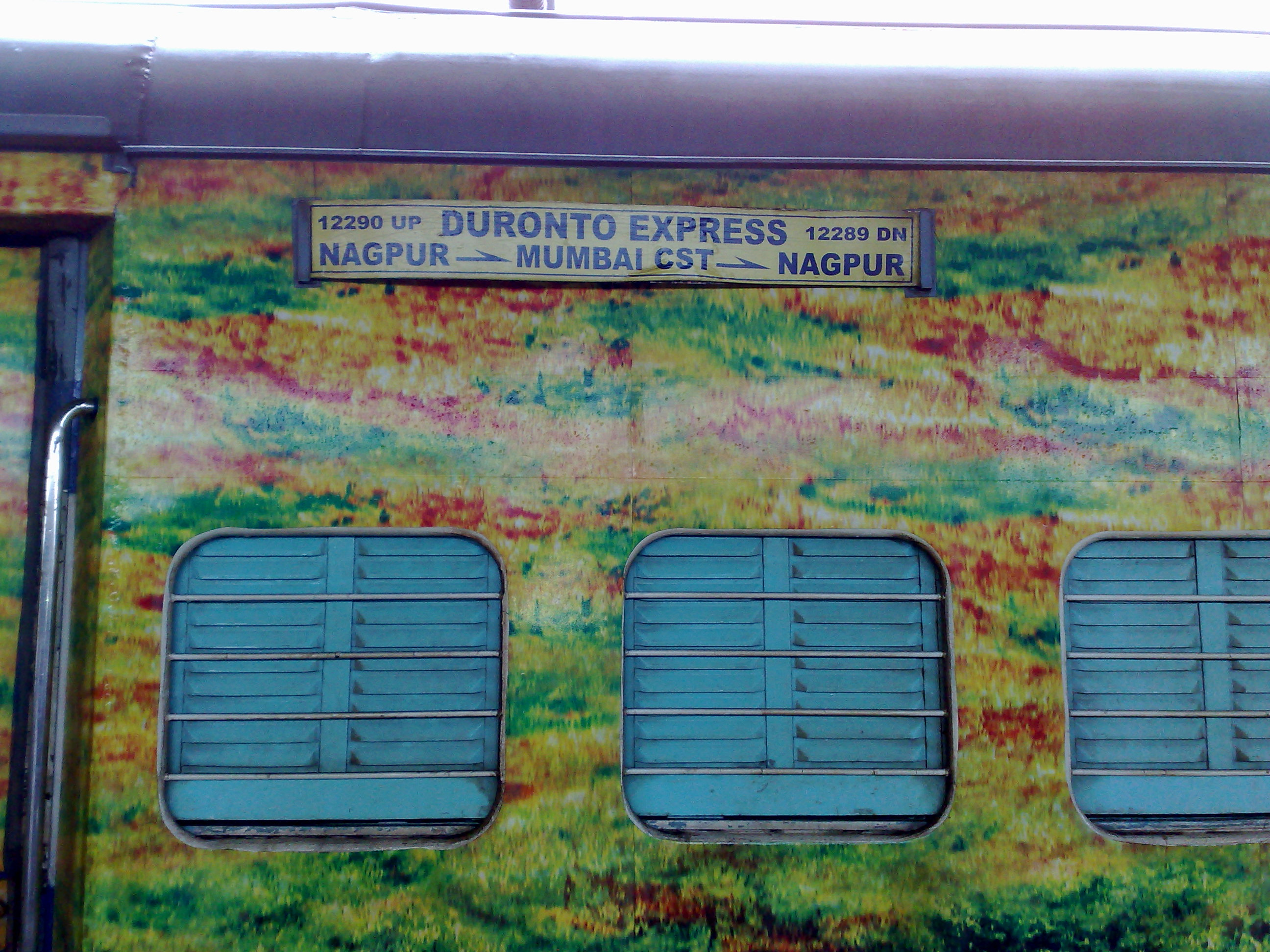
12290 Nagpur Duronto Express

== See also ==
- Duronto Express
- Vidarbha Express

== Sources ==
- "12289/Mumbai CSMT – Nagpur Duronto Express Duronto Mumbai CSMT/CSMT to Nagpur/NGP – India Rail Info – A Busy Junction for Travellers & Rail Enthusiasts". indiarailinfo.com.
- "Nagpur – Mumbai CSMT Duronto Express/12290 Duronto Time Table/Schedule Nagpur/NGP to Mumbai CSMT/CSMT – India Rail Info – A Busy Junction for Travellers & Rail Enthusiasts". indiarailinfo.com.
- "The Times of India: Latest News India, World & Business News, Cricket & Sports, Bollywood". The Times of India.
- (2289)
