= Multi-modal International Cargo Hub and Airport at Nagpur =

Airport project in India

Coordinates: 21°05′32″N 79°02′50″E

Multi-model International Cargo Hub and Airport at Nagpur
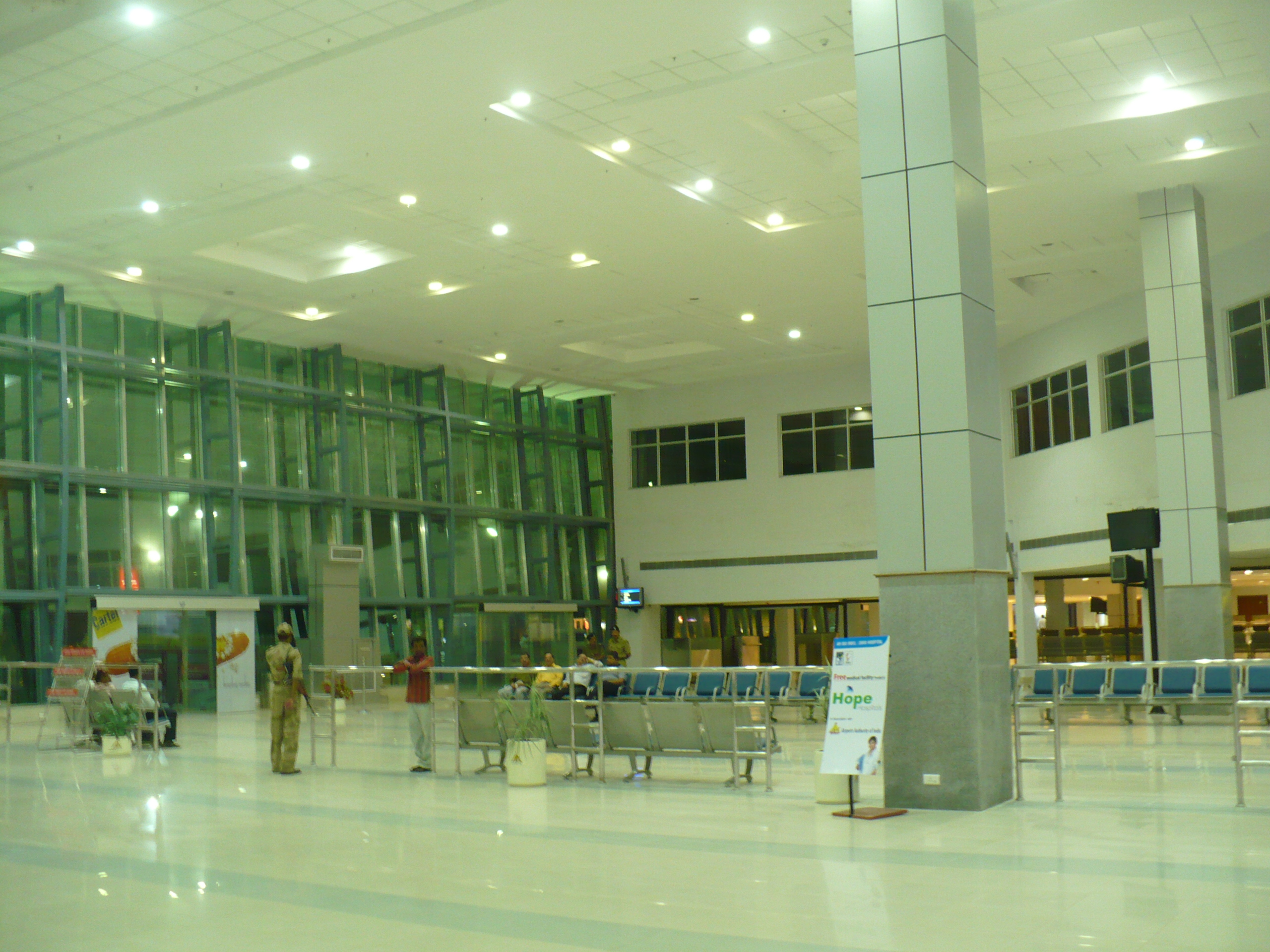
- Nagpur's Dr. Babasaheb Ambedkar International Airport has the busiest air traffic control room in India.
- Location: Nagpur
- Country: India

The Multi-modal International Cargo Hub and Airport at Nagpur (MIHAN) is an airport project for Dr. Babasaheb Ambedkar International Airport, Nagpur. It is the biggest economic development project currently underway in India in terms of investments. The project aims to exploit the central location of Nagpur and convert the present airport into a major cargo hub with integrated road and rail connectivity.

This project has two parts:

- An international airport to act as a cargo hub and
- A Special Economic Zone (SEZ) with residential zone covering a total area of 40.25 km^{2} on the southern end of Nagpur.

The Government of Maharashtra formed a special purpose entity named the Maharashtra Airport Development Company (MADC) for development of MIHAN. The project is financed by multiple Indian banks with a total loan amount of INR 30,000 crore along with investment from the state government and the Airports Authority of India. With a projected target of serving 14 million passengers and handle 0.87 million tonnes of cargo, this is one of largest aviation project in India. The estimated capital cost of the project is INR 2581 crores (by year 2035) and is supposed to generate revenues INR 5280 crores.

== Economic and social impacts ==
The project has spurred a real estate boom in Nagpur, with property prices increasing 25 to 40 percent. The project is expected to add 12 million people to the city's population by means of direct and indirect employment. The project aims at boosting the economy of the underdeveloped Vidarbha region of Maharashtra and stopping the brain drain to other parts of Maharashtra and India. From an environmental perspective, half a million trees would be planted and there would be no polluting industries allowed in MIHAN.

Nagpur has the MIDC area, Asia's second largest air maintenance workshop, SEZ, Patanjali Food Park and many more other projects under implementation, with IT and logistics businesses both having a major presence. The Maharashtra government has already taken care of infrastructure availability like roads, water and power. Also, to meet the manpower demand, Nagpur University has given sanction to 43 new engineering colleges in and around Nagpur. Singapore Changi Airport has been selected as the consultant for this project.

Mihan is already employing more than 30,000 people, and the number is expected to rise, according to the Maharashtra Airport Development Company.

== Details ==
=== Land distribution ===
The table below shows the distribution of the land at MIHAN for different purposes. The total area to be covered under the project is 4025 ha.

Land Distribution	Area in Hectares (ha)
Total Project Area	4025 ha.
Airport	1200 ha.
Road & Rail Terminal	200 ha.
Captive Power House	52 ha.
IT Parks	400 ha.
Health City	60 ha.
Other Manufacturing & Value Added Units	963 ha.
International School	10 ha.
Residential, Open Spaces, Hotels, Roads, Interchange & RoB, Water Supply, Storm Water Drainage, Sewage System, Entertainment, Utility & Land for IAF (exchange)	1140 ha.

=== International airport ===
The existing airport of 400 hectares would be expanded to 1364 hectares. The project consists of widening and extending the present runway (3200 meters × 45 meters) to 3600 meters × 60 meters to meet international standards. It will also have provision for a similar runway (4000 × 60 m) in the future. The airport will have parking space for 50 aircraft at any time with 50 additional bays at fringe areas. An airport terminal building in a semi-circular shape with conductive weather dynamics will have a total area of 3,000,000 sq ft (280,000 m^{2}). The project is also building a separate cargo complex for handling and transferring cargo to and from the airport. The contract for the expansion of the airport has been awarded to GMR.

=== Special Economic Zone (SEZ) ===
A new SEZ of 2086 hectares, the largest multi-product SEZ in India, is being built alongside the airport. Out of 2086 hectares, 1472 hectares is used by various processing units to be set up, and the remaining 614 hectares for service sector units. Like all SEZs, it has financial incentives and soft taxation policy to attract investment. The initial setup material for these units and later raw material are duty-free.

Major sections of the SEZ are:

- Information technology park spread over 500 hectares and including all necessary infrastructure for IT companies. Many tech companies like TCS, HCL, and Hexaware have started operations and are expanding. Infosys and Tech Mahindra are constructing campuses.
- Health city spread over 40 hectares that has multi-specialty hospitals along with training institutes for nurses and medical technicians such as AIIMS, Indo-UK health medicity, and the National Cancer Institute.
- Manufacturing industry unit that would include industries from sectors like textiles and garments, food processing, pharmaceuticals and bio-medical. Pharma giant Lupin has started its operations long ago. TAL also has started operations.

The SEZ has a residential zone adjoining it to take advantage of the various developments in the SEZ. Many townships such as Mahindra Bloomdale, Shiv kailasa, and Moraj township have developed. D Y Patil International school, DPS, teaches MIHAN employees' children. It has other recreational facilities like a golf course, flying club, and multiplex theatre complex.

=== Other features ===
The Central Facility Building has administrative offices of various government departments working for the MIHAN project and the main office of the Development Commissioner of MIHAN. It also has other government offices like a post office, customs and an excise office. The total area is 22,200 sq ft (2,060 m^{2}) and it is located at the main entrance of the SEZ. The building has three main blocks and two small blocks connecting the main blocks. Thus it resembles a "W" in outline. Water demand for the project is met using a dual supply. Water from Wadgaon reservoir has been brought in along with water from two small lakes which lie within the premises of MIHAN. The two small lakes would be deepened, cleaned and beautified to store and supply fresh water to MIHAN. The Project also has its own sewage water treatment plant to reuse water for non-domestic purposes. Storm drainage work consists of a 10 km long channel and nine cross-drainage projects.

A separate telephone exchange building has been built for telecommunication related infrastructure. The entire MIHAN project has had fiber optics cable laid. MIHAN has 2-, 4- and 6-lane roads with a total internal length of 51 km. Two flyovers have been built over the NH-44 which runs on one side of project. The two flyovers help connect MIHAN with the other side of highway without causing traffic congestion at the main entrance.

== Organizations ==
The state government's Maharashtra Airport Development Company (MADC) was formed in joint partnerships with equal shares from the City and Industrial Development Corporation (CIDCO), Nagpur Improvement Trust (NIT), Maharashtra Industrial Development Corporation (MIDC), Maharashtra State Road Transport Corporation (MSRTC) and Nagpur Municipal Corporation (NMC). Singapore Changi Airport have been selected as consultants for the project. The Indian Air Force (IAF) is also going to come up with its own Gajraj project alongside MIHAN.

Indian Railways has a new station, "Khapri", near MIHAN to connect the cargo hub with India's rail network. MADC would later play a larger role in Maharashtra for airports not owned by AAI and IAF. CIDCO has been selected as it had successfully formed the CIDCO city near Mumbai.

As the project is progressing, Nagpur has seen an influx of migrants adding to the city's population. The existing city bus service would not be able to cope with this, so a new bus mass transit system will be started with combine efforts from NMC, NIT, MSRTC and MIDC. NMC and NIT are together responsible for civic administration in the Greater Nagpur Metropolitan Area and MSRTC and Indian Railways are responsible for developing logistic infrastructure.

Boeing has transferred its MRO facility to Air India. Boeing cited its exit as due to financial constraints. This facility will provide MRO facilities to all wide-bodied Air India planes. AAR Indamer has also constructed an MRO besides the Air India MRO.The MRO facility in Nagpur has potential considering its strategic geographic location and cost effectiveness. The DRAL produces nose cones for falcon jets and other smaller parts of planes.

Many IT companies have taken land in MIHAN, but most of them have not started work so far. TCS and HCL have started functioning and are expanding while Infosys and Tech Mahindra are constructing campuses.

== See also ==
- Make in Maharashtra
- Transport in Nagpur
- Vidarbha
- Marathwada
- Economy of Maharashtra
