= Bilaspur–Nagpur Vande Bharat Express =

Mini Vande Bharat Express train route in India

Bilaspur Junction - Nagpur Junction Vande Bharat Express

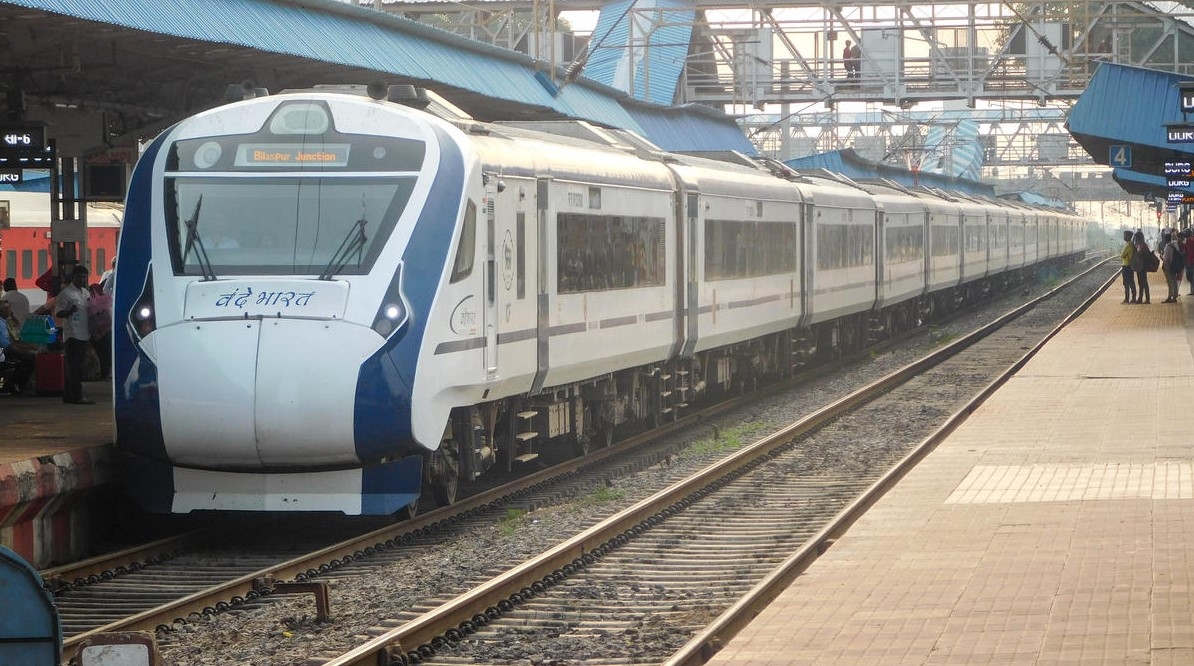
- Nagpur Bilaspur VB Express Arriving At Durg Junction railway station

Overview
- Service type: Vande Bharat Express
- Locale: Chhattisgarh and Maharashtra
- First service: 11 December 2022 (Inaugural run); 12 December 2022; 3 years ago (Commercial run)
- Current operator: South East Central Railways (SECR)

Route
- Termini: Bilaspur Junction (BSP); Nagpur Junction (NGP)
- Stops: 4
- Distance travelled: 412 km (256 mi)
- Average journey time: 05 hrs 30 mins
- Service frequency: Six days a week (Note: Except Saturdays)
- Train number: 20825 / 20826
- Line used: Bilaspur–Nagpur section

On-board services
- Classes: AC Chair Car, AC Executive Chair Car
- Seating arrangements: Airline style; Rotatable seats
- Sleeping arrangements: No
- Catering facilities: On-board catering
- Observation facilities: Large windows in all coaches
- Entertainment facilities: On-board WiFi; Infotainment System; Electric outlets; Reading light; Seat Pockets; Bottle Holder; Tray Table
- Baggage facilities: Overhead racks
- Other facilities: Kavach

Technical
- Rolling stock: Vande Bharat 2.0
- Track gauge: Indian gauge 1,676 mm (5 ft 6 in) broad gauge
- Electrification: 25 kV 50 Hz AC Overhead line
- Operating speed: 75 km/h (47 mph) (Avg.)
- Average length: 384 metres (1,260 ft) (16 coaches)
- Track owner: Indian Railways
- Rake maintenance: Bilaspur Junction (BSP)

The 20825/20826 Bilaspur - Nagpur Vande Bharat Express is India's 6th Vande Bharat Express train, connecting the states of Chhattisgarh and Maharashtra.

== Overview ==
This train is operated by Indian Railways, connecting Bilaspur Jn, Raipur Jn, Durg Jn, Raj Nandgaon, Dongargarh railway station, Gondia Jn and Nagpur Jn. It is currently operated with train numbers 20825/20826 on 6 days a week basis.

== Rakes ==
Train operation started with the fourth 2nd Generation (16 coaches) VBE trainset designed and manufactured by the ICF. However the rake was withdrawn and replaced with Mini Vande Bharat 2.0 (MVB2) in the month of May 2023 because of low occupancy.

=== Coach augmentation ===
As per latest updates, this express train will be augmented with 8 additional AC coaches, thereby running with an existing Vande Bharat 2.0 trainset W.E.F. 1 June 2025 in order to enhance passenger capacity on this demanding route.

== Service ==
The 20825/20826 Bilaspur Jn - Nagpur Jn Vande Bharat Express operates six days a week except Saturdays, covering a distance of 412 km (256 mi) in a travel time of 5 hours with an average speed of 75 km/h (47 mph). The service has 5 intermediate stops. The Maximum Permissible Speed is 130 km/h (81 mph).

== Incidents ==
After the launch of the 6th Vande Bharat Express (Bilaspur - Nagpur - Bilaspur), on Wednesday 14 December 2022, an unidentified man threw a stone on the windowpane of the newly inaugurated express train. This incident took place between Durg Junction and Bhilai Nagar railway station. Luckily no casualties were reported.

== See also ==
- Vande Bharat Express
- Tejas Express
- Gatimaan Express
- Bilaspur Junction railway station
- Nagpur Junction railway station
