= Vidarbha Superfast Express =

Train in India

Overview
- Service type: Superfast
- Locale: Maharashtra
- First service: 2 May 1988; 38 years ago
- Current operator: Central Railway

Route
- Termini: CSMT Mumbai (CSMT); Gondia (G)
- Stops: 24
- Distance travelled: 965 km (600 mi)
- Average journey time: 16 hours 10 minutes
- Service frequency: Daily
- Train number: 12105 / 12106

On-board services
- Classes: AC First Class, AC 2 Tier, AC 3 Tier, AC 3 Tier Economy, Sleeper Class, General Unreserved
- Seating arrangements: Yes
- Sleeping arrangements: Yes
- Catering facilities: On-board catering, E-catering available
- Observation facilities: Large windows
- Baggage facilities: Available
- Other facilities: Below the seats

Technical
- Rolling stock: LHB coach
- Track gauge: 1,676 mm (5 ft 6 in)
- Operating speed: 130 km/h (81 mph) maximum, 60 km/h (37 mph) average including halts.
Route map
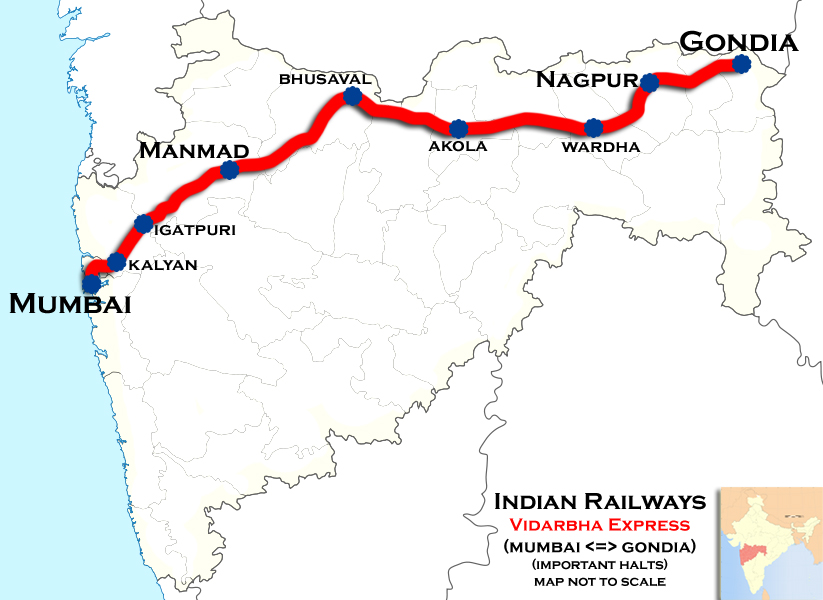

The 12105 / 12106 Vidarbha Superfast Express is an express train belonging to Indian Railways – Central Railway zone that runs between Mumbai CSMT and Gondia in Maharashtra. It is a daily service. It operates as train number 12105 from Mumbai CSMT to Gondia and as train number 12106 in the reverse direction.

== Coaches ==
The 12105/12106 Vidarbha Superfast Express has LHB 1 AC First, 3 AC II tier, 5 AC III tier, 7 Sleeper Class, 4 General Unreserved and 2 EoG cum SLR (Seating cum Luggage Rake) coaches.

As with most train services in India, coach composition may be amended at the discretion of Indian Railways depending on demand.

The service was the first air-brake rake train from Nagpur Division of Central Railways and used to have green-blue liveried coaches when introduced with D suffixed on coach numbers at end. The rake was later on transferred to Mumbai Division when it was extended to Gondia.

== Service ==
The 12105/12106 Vidarbha Superfast Express initially ran between Mumbai CSMT and Nagpur and was later extended to Gondia.

It is a daily service covering the distance of 967 km in 16 hours as 2105 and 16 hours 05 mins as 12106 at an average speed of 60.44 km/h in both directions.

== Routing ==
The 12105/12106 Vidarbha Superfast Express runs from Mumbai CSMT via Dadar Central, Thane, Kalyan, Nashik Road, Manmad, Chalisgaon, Jalgaon, Bhusawal, Shegaon, Akola, Badnera, Chandur, Dhamangaon, Pulgaon, Wardha, Nagpur, Kamptee, Tumsar Road, Bhandara Road, Tirora to Gondia.

== Traction ==
It is hauled by a Ajni Loco Shed based WAP-7 electric locomotive from end to end.

== Trivia ==
The Vidarbha Express is so named as it initially plied to Nagpur which falls in the Vidarbha region of Maharashtra.

Now the engine swap does not take place in Igatpuri.

== Operation ==
12105 Vidarbha Express leaves Mumbai CSMT every day at 19:05 hrs IST and reaches Gondia the next day at 11:15 hrs IST.

On return, the 12106 Vidarbha Express leaves Gondia every day at 14:55 hrs IST and reaches Mumbai CSMT the next day at 6:50 hrs IST.
