= Kalamna railway station =

Railway station in Maharashtra, India

Kalamna कळमणा

General information
- Location: Ring Road, Kalamna, Nagpur – 441001, Maharashtra; India
- Coordinates: 21.1679°N 79.1410°E
- Elevation: 296 metres (971 ft)
- System: Passenger train station
- Owner: Indian Railways
- Operator: South East Central Railway zone
- Lines: Howrah–Nagpur–Mumbai line Nagpur–Chhindwara branch line
- Platforms: 3

Construction
- Structure type: At ground
- Parking: Available

Other information
- Status: Functional
- Station code: KAV
- Zone(s): South East Central Railway zone
- Division(s): Nagpur SEC
Location

Kalamna is a local urban rail station in vicinity of Nagpur in Maharashtra lies on Howrah–Nagpur–Mumbai line.

== Capacity ==
It has over 13 line and 292 routes. It has one of the biggest yards in Indian railways and South East Central Railway. The new enhancements in 2024 include inter-locking of 13 tracks and adding a third line. SECR’s lines extends from Kalamna to Durg covering a distance of 258 km and the third line of 214 km adds significant value in terms of capacity and safety. It also improves yard efficiency, smoother train movement, and economic benefits.

== Location ==
It is 7 km from Nagpur Junction and 3 km from Itwari Junction.

== Remodelling ==
The remodelling of Kalamna rail station was taken up in August 2024 involving removal of 8 old points and adding 14 new points and 14 crossovers to ease congestion and enhance safety.
