= Sonegaon (Nipani) =

- Census town
- Location in Maharashtra, India
- Coordinates: 20.8048°N 78.9577°E
- Country: India
- State: Maharashtra
- District: Nagpur

Population (2001)
  - Total: 11,804

Languages
  - Official: Marathi
- Time zone: UTC+5:30 (IST)

Sonegaon (Nipani) is a census town in Nagpur district in the Indian state of Maharashtra.

== Demographics ==
As of 2001 India census, Sonegaon (Nipani) had a population of 11,804. Males constitute 53% of the population and females 47%. Sonegaon (Nipani) has an average literacy rate of 82%, higher than the national average of 59.5%: male literacy is 87%, and female literacy is 77%. In Sonegaon (Nipani), 9% of the population is under 6 years of age.
