= Nagpur Junction railway station =

Railway station in Maharashtra, India

Nagpur Junction
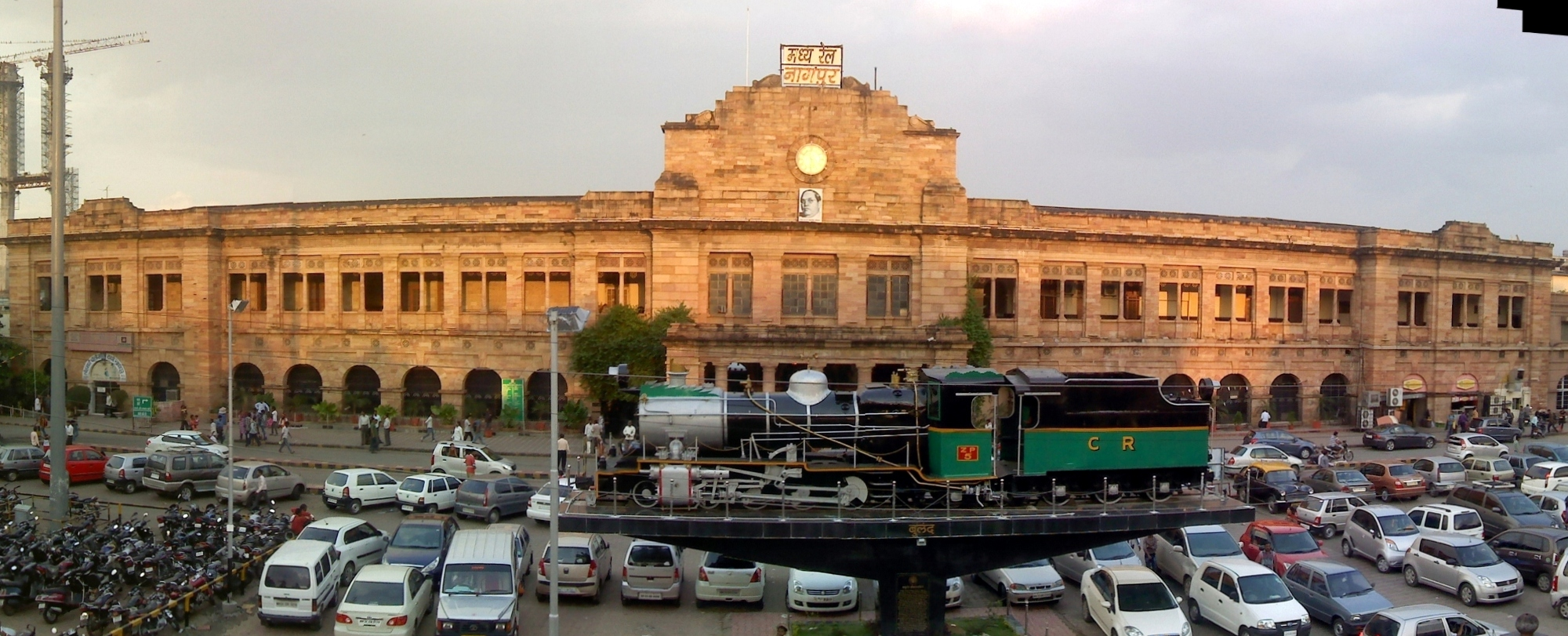

General information
- Location: Sitabuldi, Nagpur, Maharashtra; India
- Coordinates: 21.1534°N 79.0889°E
- Elevation: 308.660 metres (1,012.66 ft)
- System: Indian Railways station
- Owner: Indian Railways
- Operator: Central Railway
- Lines: New Delhi–Chennai main line, Howrah–Nagpur–Mumbai line, Bhopal–Nagpur section, Nagpur–Secunderabad section, Bilaspur–Nagpur section, Nagpur–Bhusawal section
- Platforms: 8
- Tracks: 13
- Connections: Aqua Line Nagpur Railway Station; NMPL

Construction
- Structure type: Standard (on-ground station)
- Parking: Yes
- Accessible: Available

Other information
- Status: Functional
- Station code: NGP
- Zone(s): Central Railway
- Division(s): Nagpur CR; Nagpur SEC

History
- Opened: 1867; 159 years ago
- Electrified: 1988–89 (Ballarshah–Nagpur); 1990–91 (Nagpur–Amla); 1991–92 (Tharsa–Nagpur)

Passengers
- 185,000 daily (approx)

Services
Preceding station	Indian Railways	Following station
Ajni towards ?	Central Railway zone New Delhi–Chennai main line	Godhani towards ?
Terminus	South East Central Railway zone Howrah–Nagpur–Mumbai line	Kalamna towards ?
Preceding station	Nagpur Metro	Following station
Dosar Vaishya Square towards Prajapati Nagar	Aqua Line transfer at Nagpur Railway Station	Sitabuldi towards Lokmanya Nagar
Location

Nagpur Junction (station code: NGP) is a railway station in Nagpur, in the Indian state of Maharashtra. It is an important junction station on the Howrah–Mumbai and Delhi–Chennai trunk line of the Indian Railways. It belongs to the A1 category of railway stations and is one of the top 100 stations of the Indian Railways system in terms of total bookings.

== History ==
Nagpur Junction is one of the oldest and busiest stations in Maharashtra. Railways came to Nagpur in 1867, when a portion of the Bombay-Bhusaval-Nagpur line was opened for traffic. In 1881, it was connected to Kolkata via the Nagpur State Railway of Chhattisgarh.
The laying of the foundation stone of the existing building was done in 1906. It was officially inaugurated on 15 January 1925 by then Governor Sir Frank Sly. Before 1924, the original railway station was located towards the east of its current site near Shukrawari Lake. The present-day railway station was also put up in the pre-independence days. It has become a major tourist destination.

== Major trains ==
The train which originates from Nagpur Junction are :

● Nagpur–CSMT Kolhapur Express (11403/11404)

● Pune–Nagpur Garib Rath Express (12113/12114)

● Pune–Nagpur Express (12135/12136)

● Deekshabhoomi Express (11045/11046)

● Sewagram Express (12139/12140)

● Dhanbad - Coimbatore Amrit Bharat Express (22363/22364)

● Mumbai CSMT–Nagpur Duronto Express (12289/12290)

● Indore–Nagpur Tri Shatabdi Express (12914/12915)

● Dr. Ambedkar Nagar–Nagpur Superfast Express (12923/12924)

● Nagpur–Secunderabad Vande Bharat Express (20101/20102)

● Bilaspur–Nagpur Vande Bharat Express (20825/20826)

● Indore–Nagpur Vande Bharat Express (20911/20912)

● Nagpur–Amritsar AC Superfast Express (22125/22126)

● Prerana Express (22137/22138)

● Pune–Nagpur Humsafar Express (22141/22142)

● Nagpur–Jaipur Weekly Express (22175/22176)

== Services ==
Nagpur is the divisional headquarters of two railway zones, Central Railway and South East Central Railway. Nagpur division has GT Route from Itarsi to Ballarshah and Mumbai-Howrah route from Gondia to Badnera. North-South and East-West traffic crisscrosses through the Division, making its Nagpur-Wardha section one of the busiest sections in Indian Railways. It has 3 branch lines connecting Amla-Chhindwara, Narkhed-Amravati & Majri-Pimpalkutti on Broad Gauge and one branch line Pulgaon-Arvi in Narrow Gauge . Shortest run by Indian Railways’ train is the scheduled services between Nagpur and Ajni stations situated just 3 km from each other.

Around 254 Mail/Express and Passenger trains halt at the station, with approximately 185,000 passengers embarking and disembarking. 22 trains originate from and terminate at this station. Direct trains are available for most of the state capitals and major cities in India, including: Mumbai, New Delhi, Bengaluru, Hyderabad, Chennai, and Kolkata.

There are 6 railway stations within the extended city limit

Station name	Station code	Railway zone	Total platforms
Ajni	AJNI	Central Railway	3 + 4(under construction)
Itwari Junction	ITR	South East Central Railway	6 + 3(under construction)
Kalamna	KAV	South East Central Railway	3
Khapri	KRI	Central Railway	2
Godhani	GNQ	Central Railway	2
Kamptee	KP	South East Central Railway	3

== Development ==
In 2008, Nagpur Junction was among 22 stations in India that were recommended to be upgraded to meet international standards. Priority areas were identified: security, safety, and cleanliness. Work was to be undertaken via public–private partnerships and the Central Railway.

=== Salwa–Butibori Chord Line ===
There is detention to freight trains due to conflict and priority to Mail, Express and Passenger trains. While line capacity is being augmented on the corridors leading to Nagpur by construction of a 3rd line, it is not found feasible, to lay independent lines for passing through traffic in the Nagpur area, because of space constraint.

This will decongest Nagpur, Ajni, Kalamna, and Itwari Railway Line Yards, thus facilitating the running of EMUs in and around Nagpur and reducing the detention of trains.

=== Nagpur Station Redevelopment ===
Indian Railway's Nagpur Railway station will soon have modernized makeover with massive renovation. Heritage Conservation Committee has approved the redevelopment plan of Nagpur Railway station, to be conducted by the Indian Railway Stations Development Corporation Limited (IRSDC). The proposal was considered by the Heritage Conservation Committee, composed of eminent engineers, architects and environmentalists and the following strategy were planned:

- Heritage Impact Assessment Report was prepared considering that the Heritage Grade II buildings have regional as well as local importance, along with special architectural, aesthetic merit, its historical and cultural significance, ornamentation, workmanship, and climate-responsive architecture.
- It is proposed in the plan to declutter heritage building by relocating the surrounding similar-looking buildings and enhance beauty as well as the grandeur of the heritage building. The proposal also introduced a lift for universal accessibility as well as to modernize without disturbing the heritage.
- The plan proposes to segregate passenger flows in the railway station and minimize cross-movement and clutter during peak hours.
- The circulation corridors in the ground floor of the railway station which are currently being utilized for station administration functions will be cleared.
- To emphasize the look and feel of the heritage block elevation, cleaning, and regular maintenance will be done.
- The plan proposes to streamline facade controls in terms of signage, which includes type, color, size, etc.

== Amenities ==
The main building of the station has waiting rooms for the passengers. A reception-cum-lounge is provided in the retiring rooms for the comfort of passengers during the check-in/check-out period. There are two entry/exit gates for entering and leaving the station premises. The west-end Sitabuldi side is the main entry point, other is from the cotton market side.

== Diesel Loco Shed, Motibagh ==
A diesel loco shed lies to the north of Nagpur Junction railway station. A former Narrow gauge diesel shed, it only houses shunter locomotives after the closing of the narrow gauge routes in 2019.

Diesel Loco Shed, Motibagh
Serial No.	Locomotive Class	Horsepower	Holding
1.	ZDM-4	700	12
2.	WDG-3A	3100	34
3.	WDS-6	1400	6
Total Locomotives Active as of May 2025			52

== Picture gallery ==
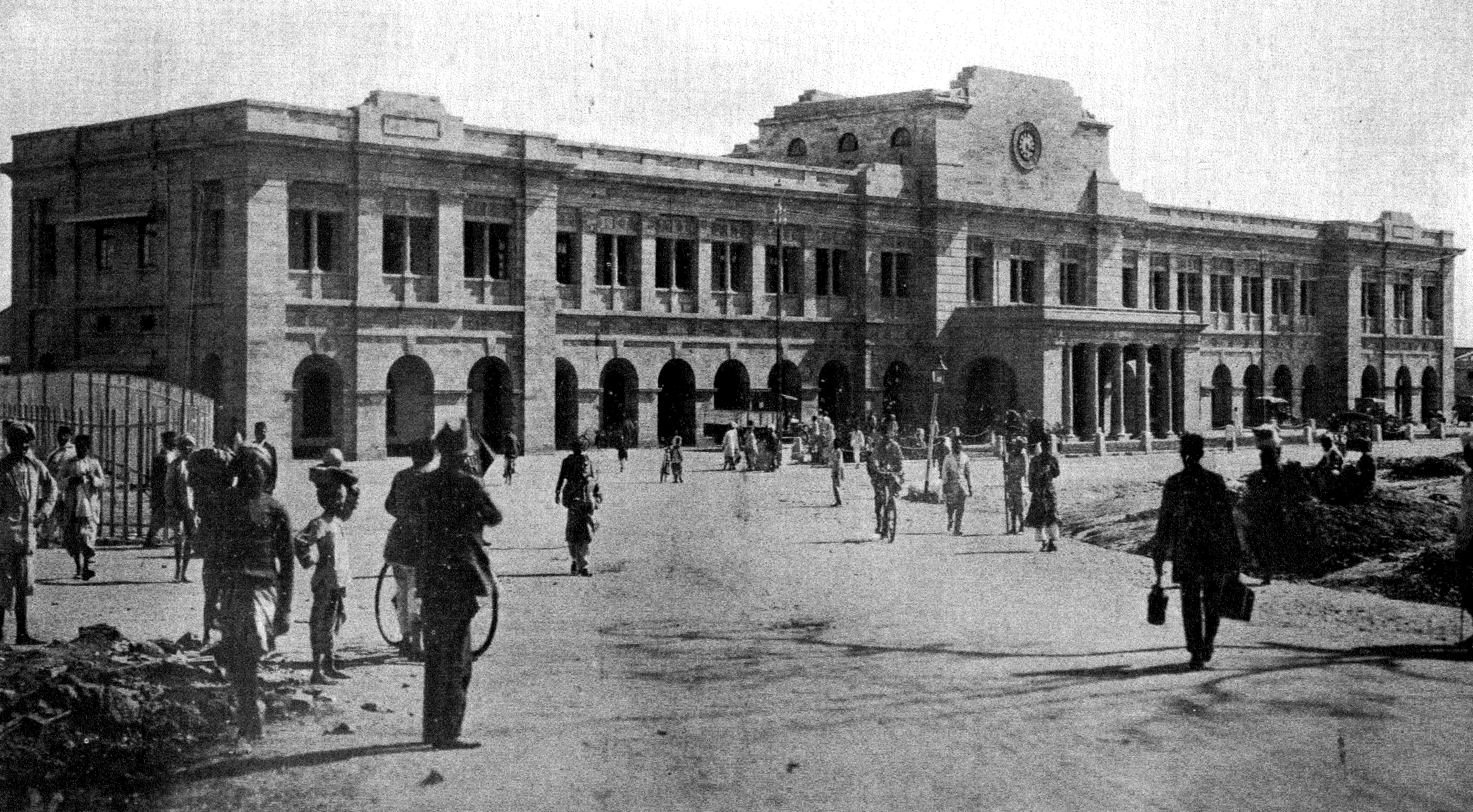
Heritage building

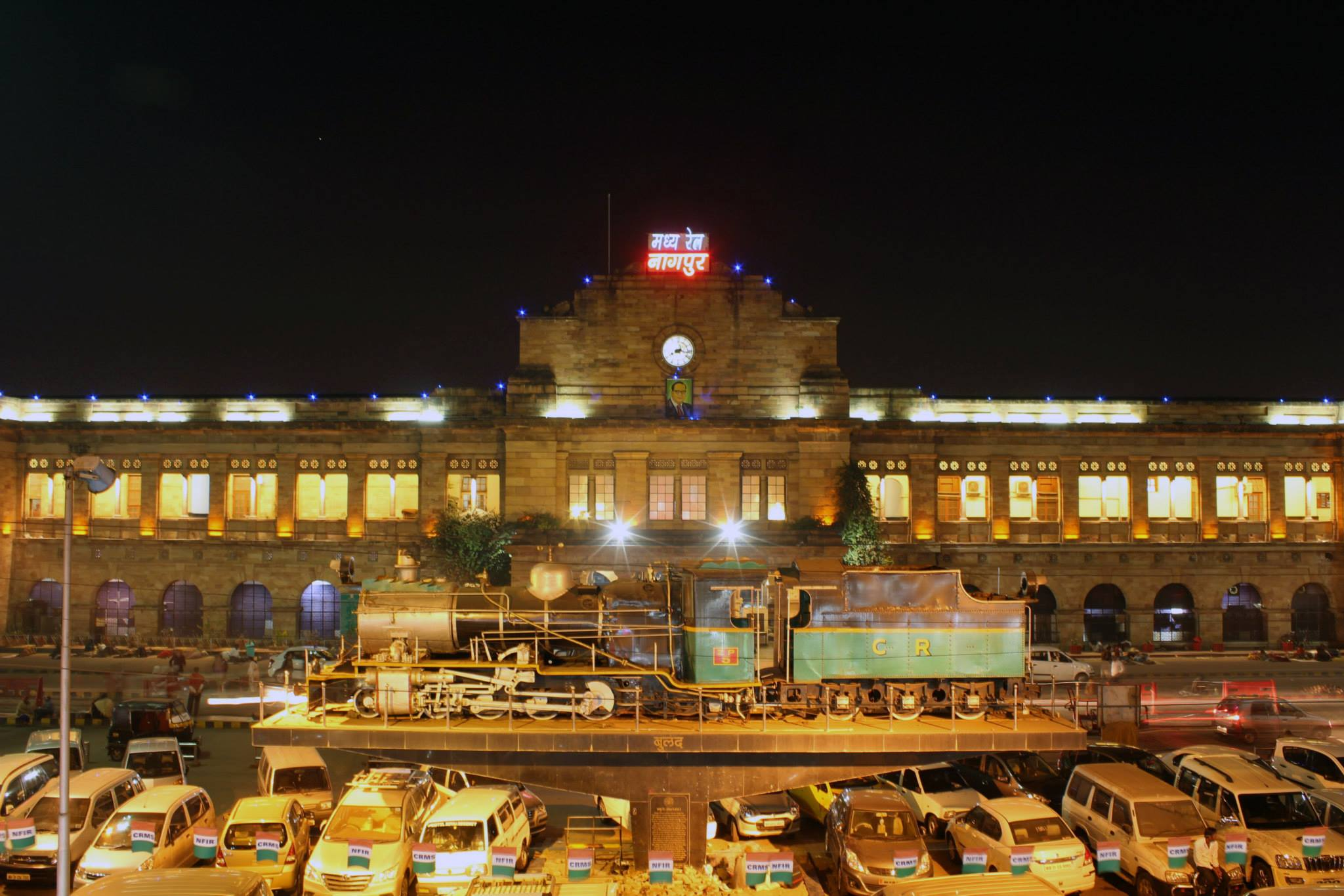
Night view of the station building

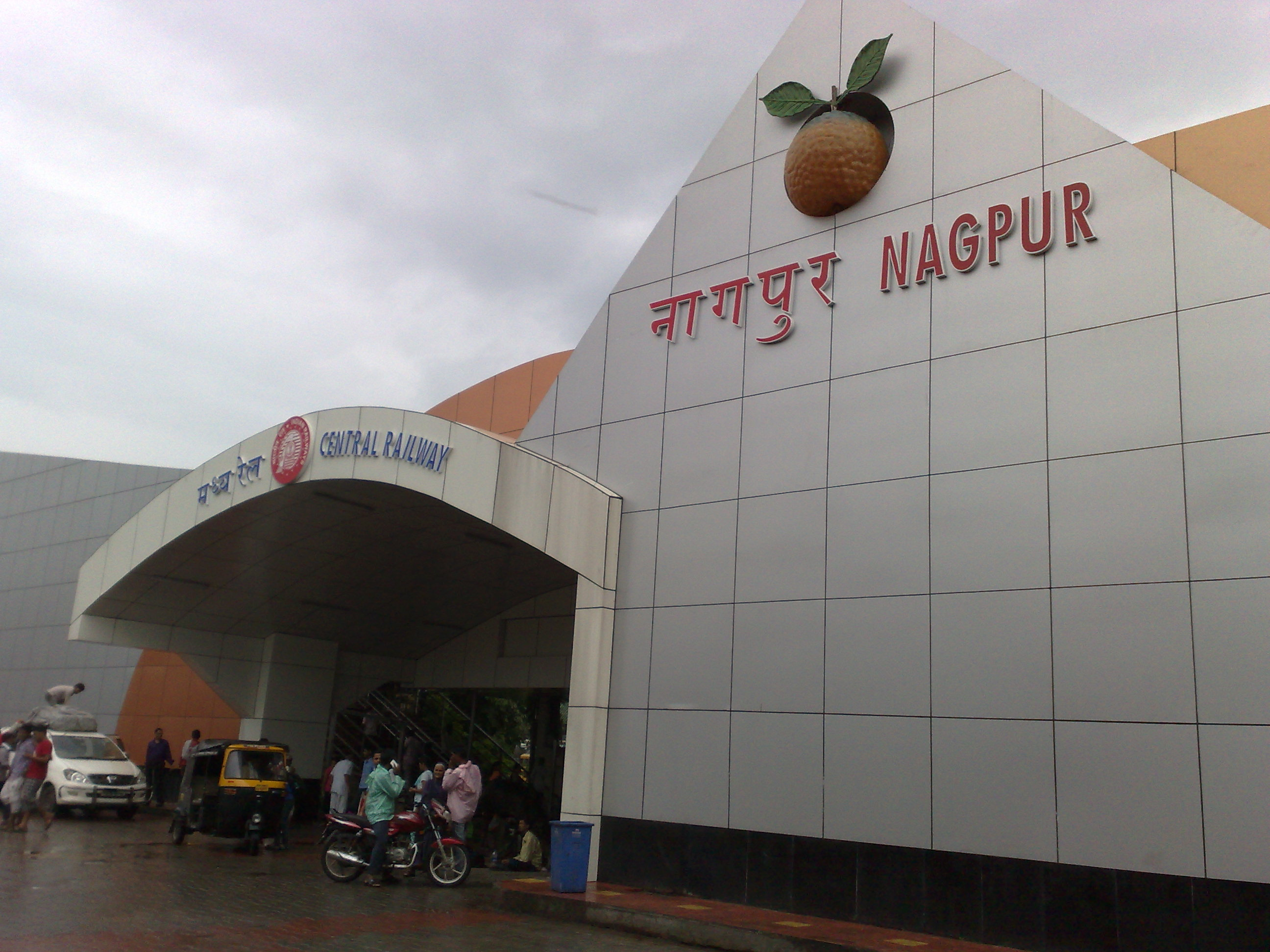
East-side entrance

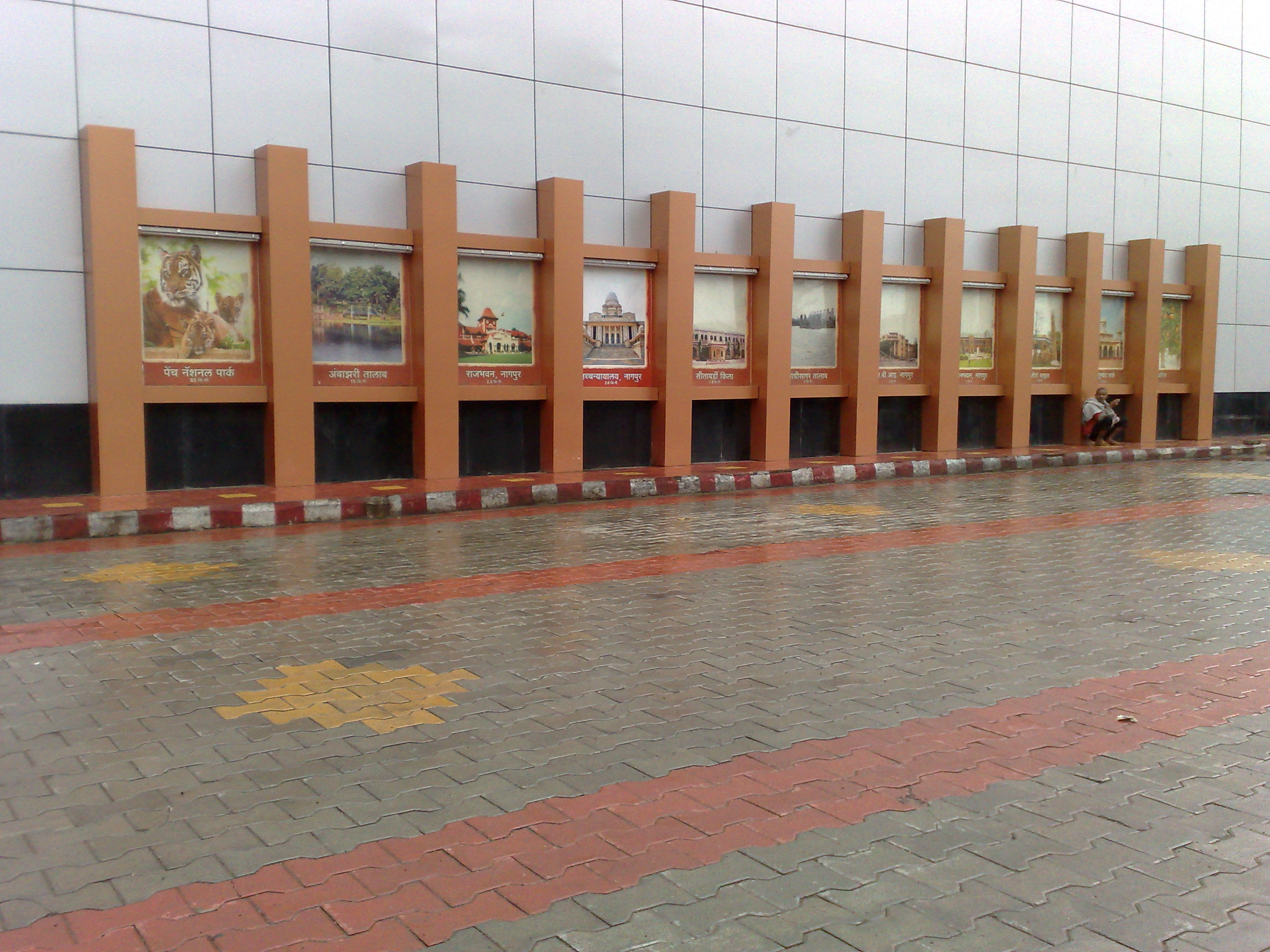
East-side station building

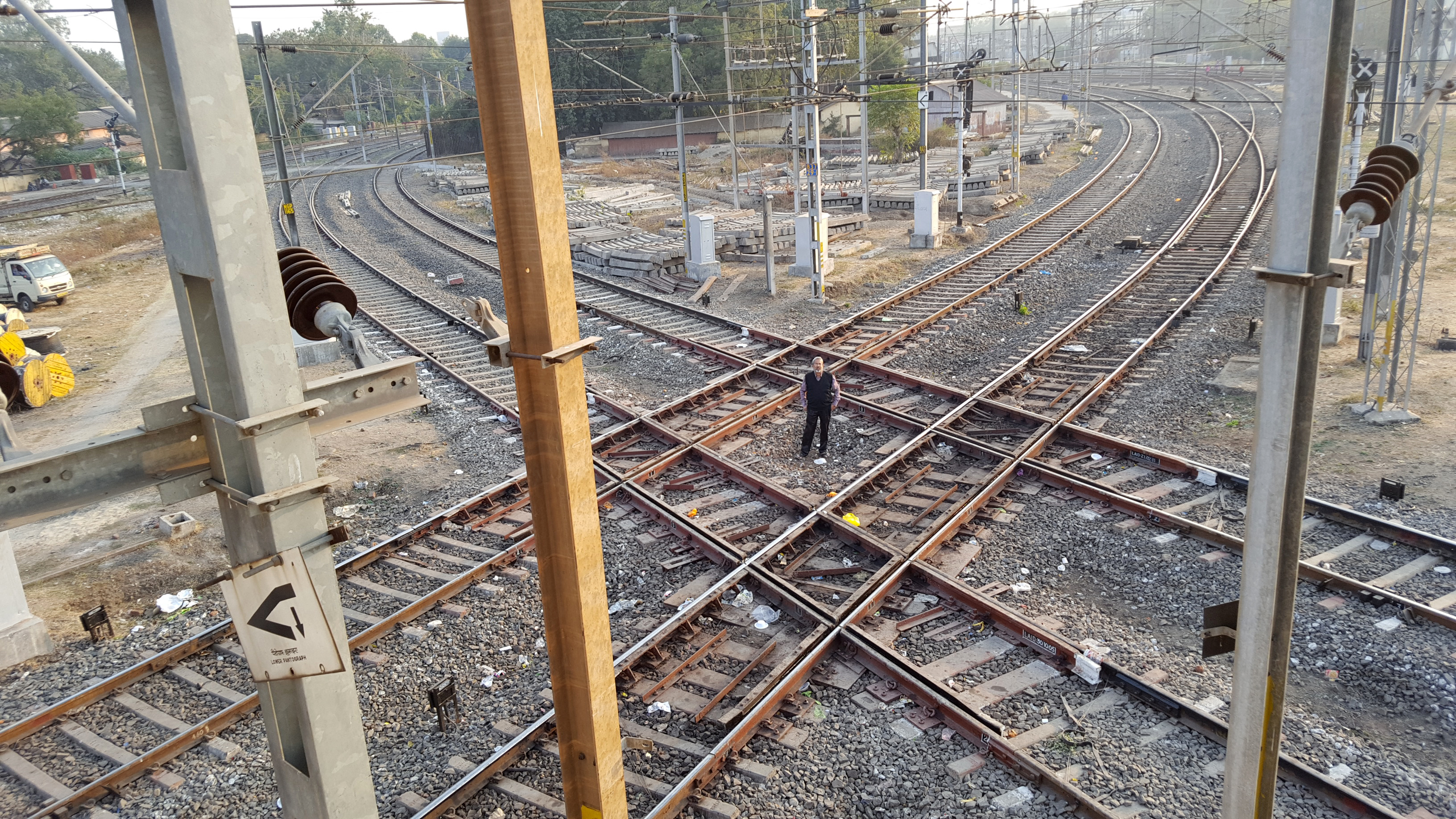
Diamond crossing near north side

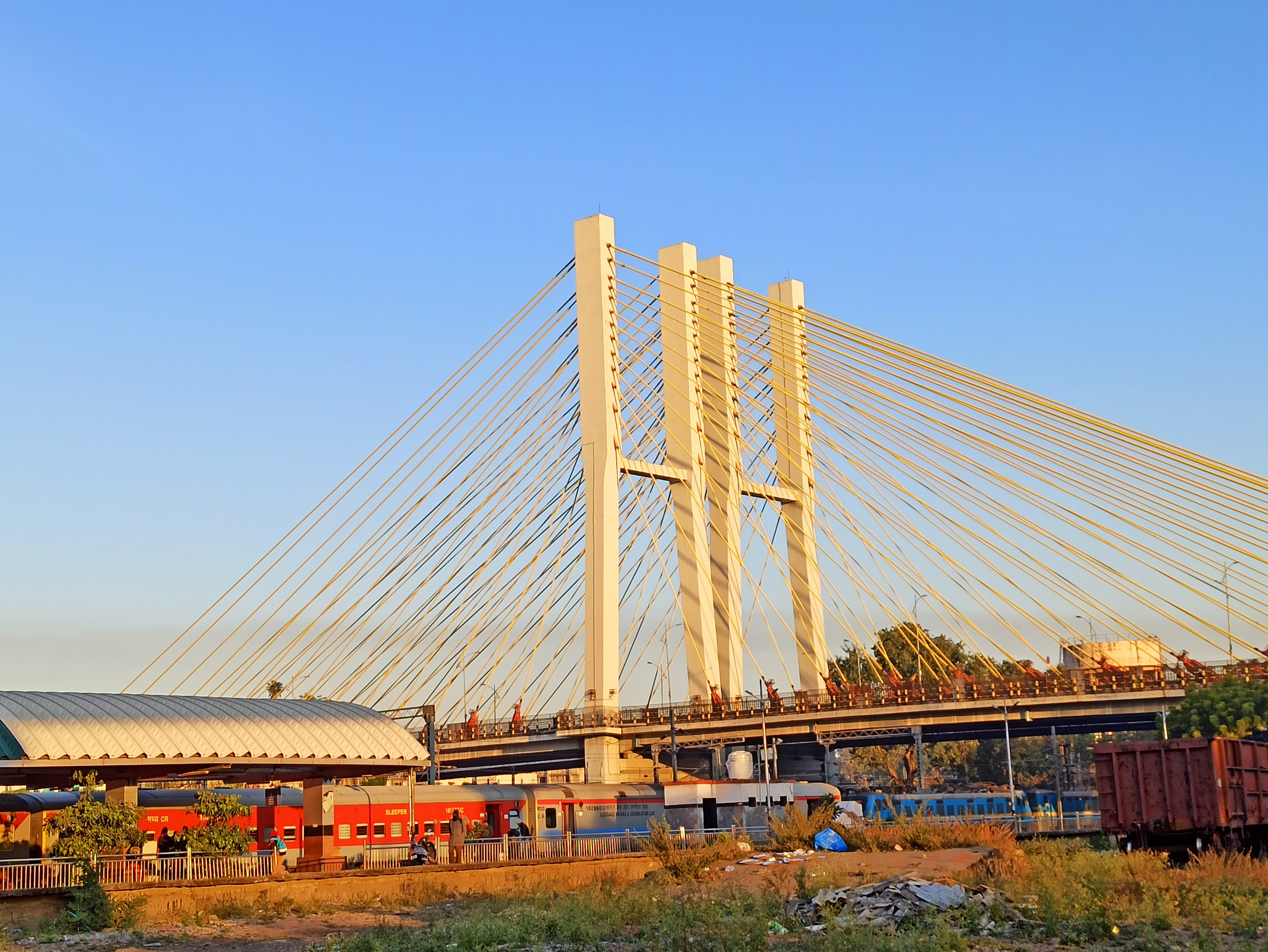
Ram Jhula

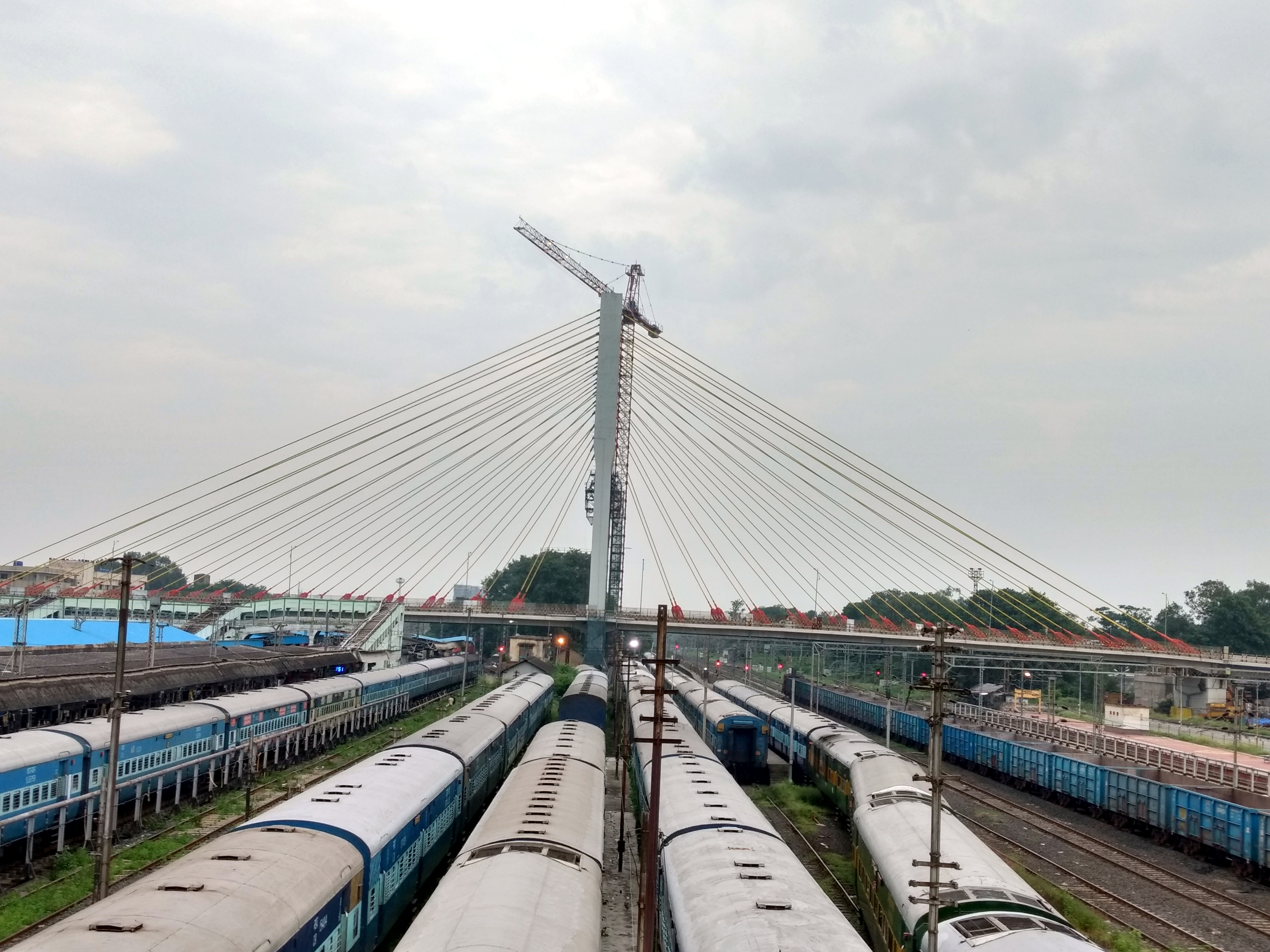
Ram jhula from FOB

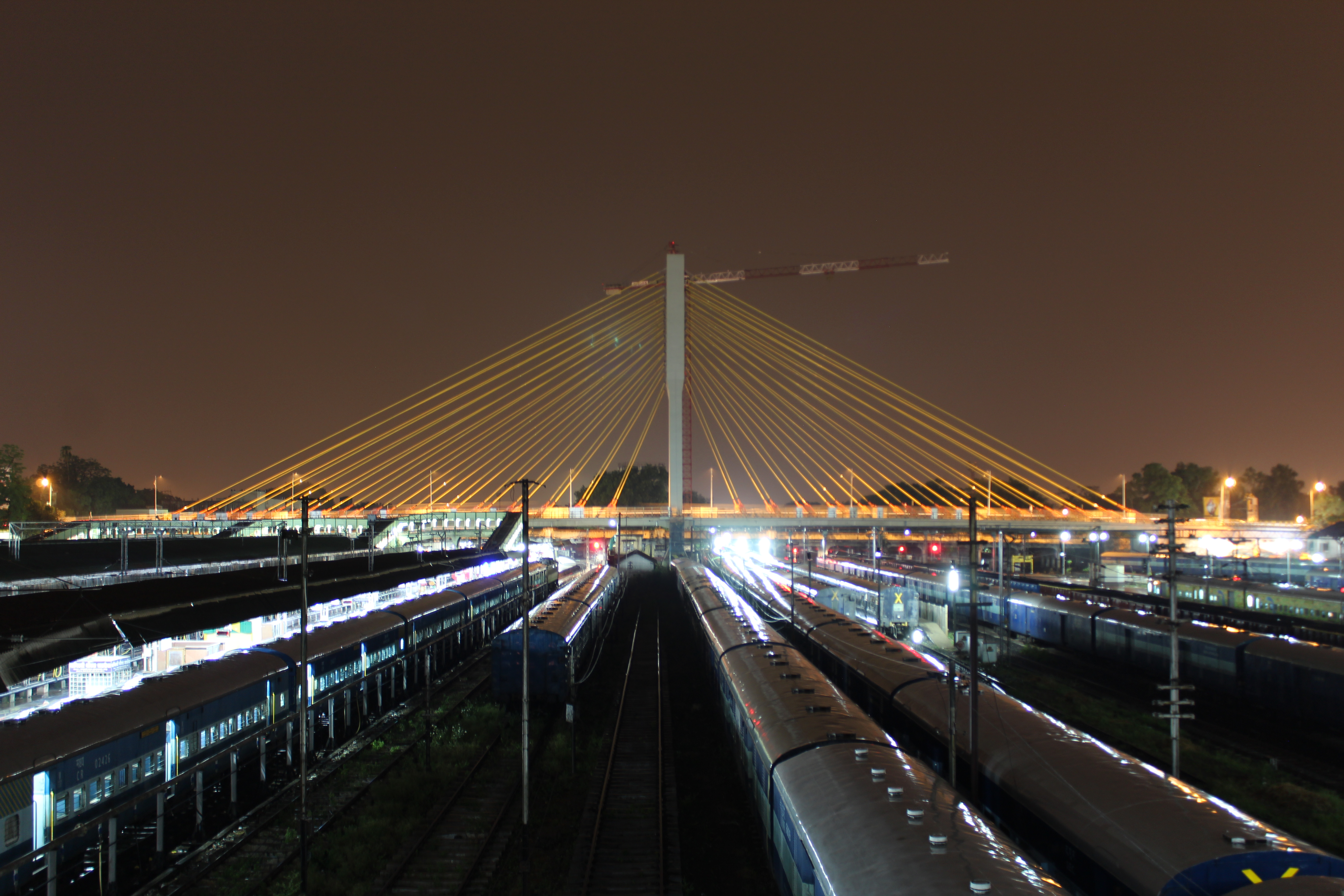
Night view from FOB

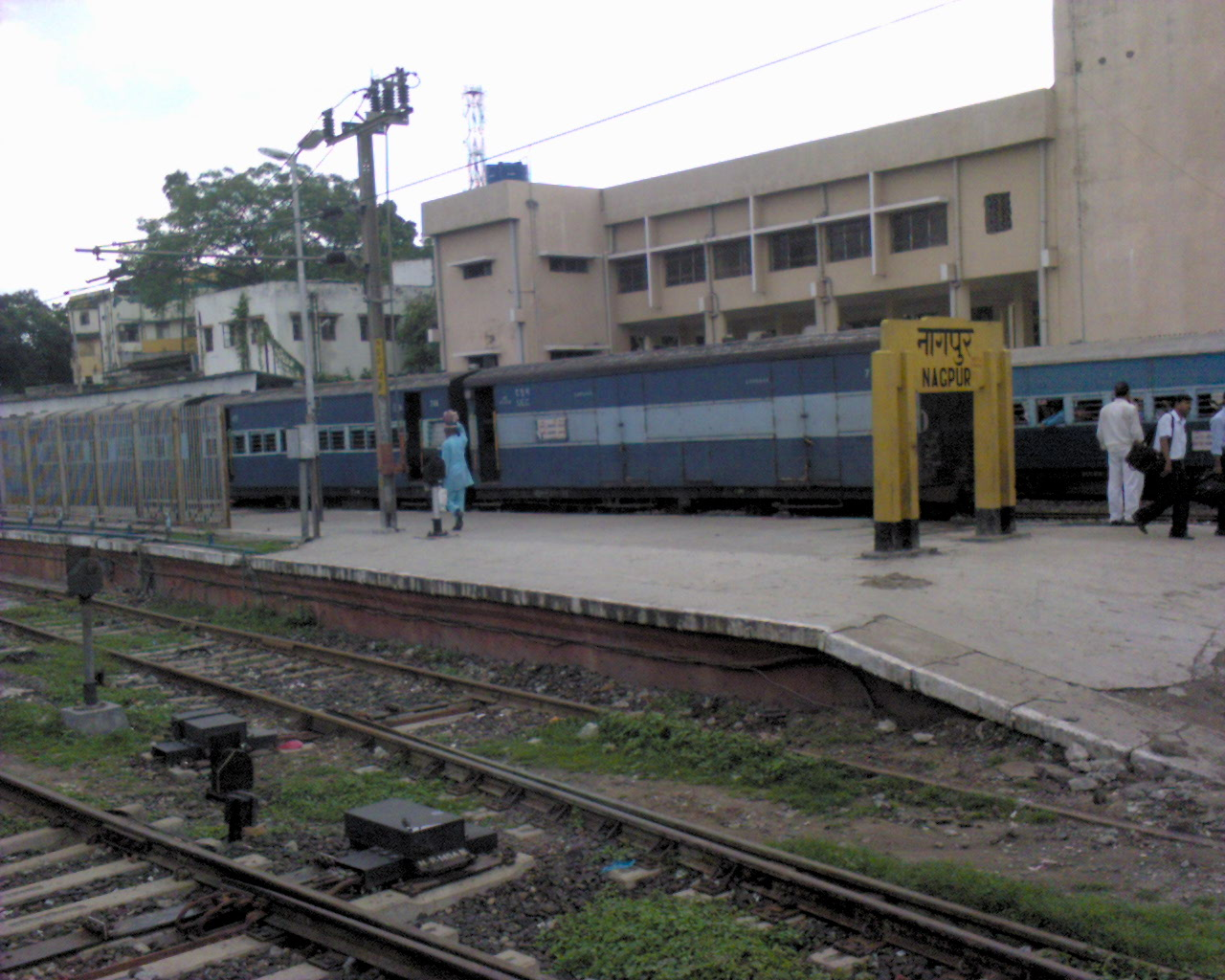
Narrow gauge platform (Decommissioned)

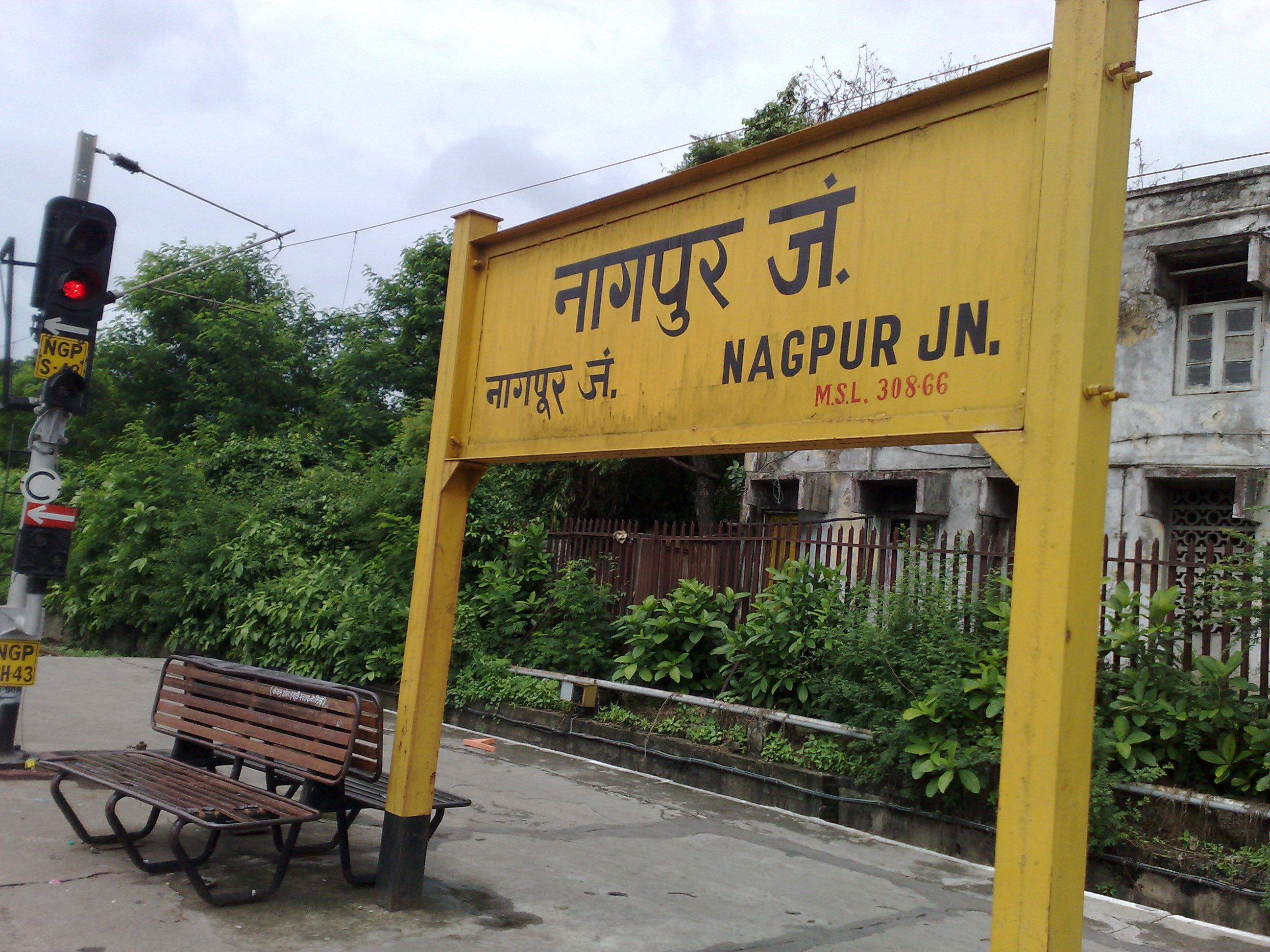
Station board

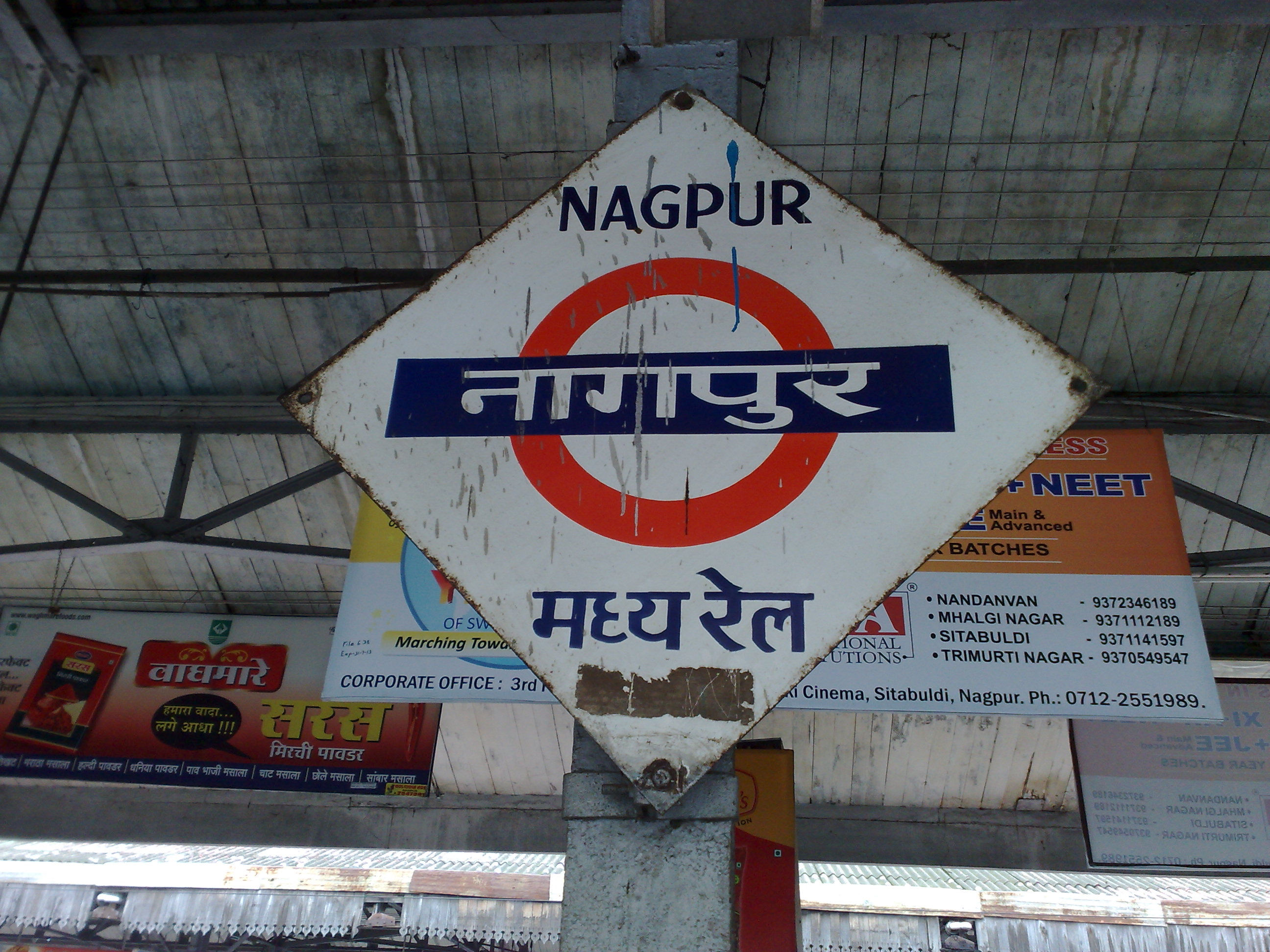
Platform board

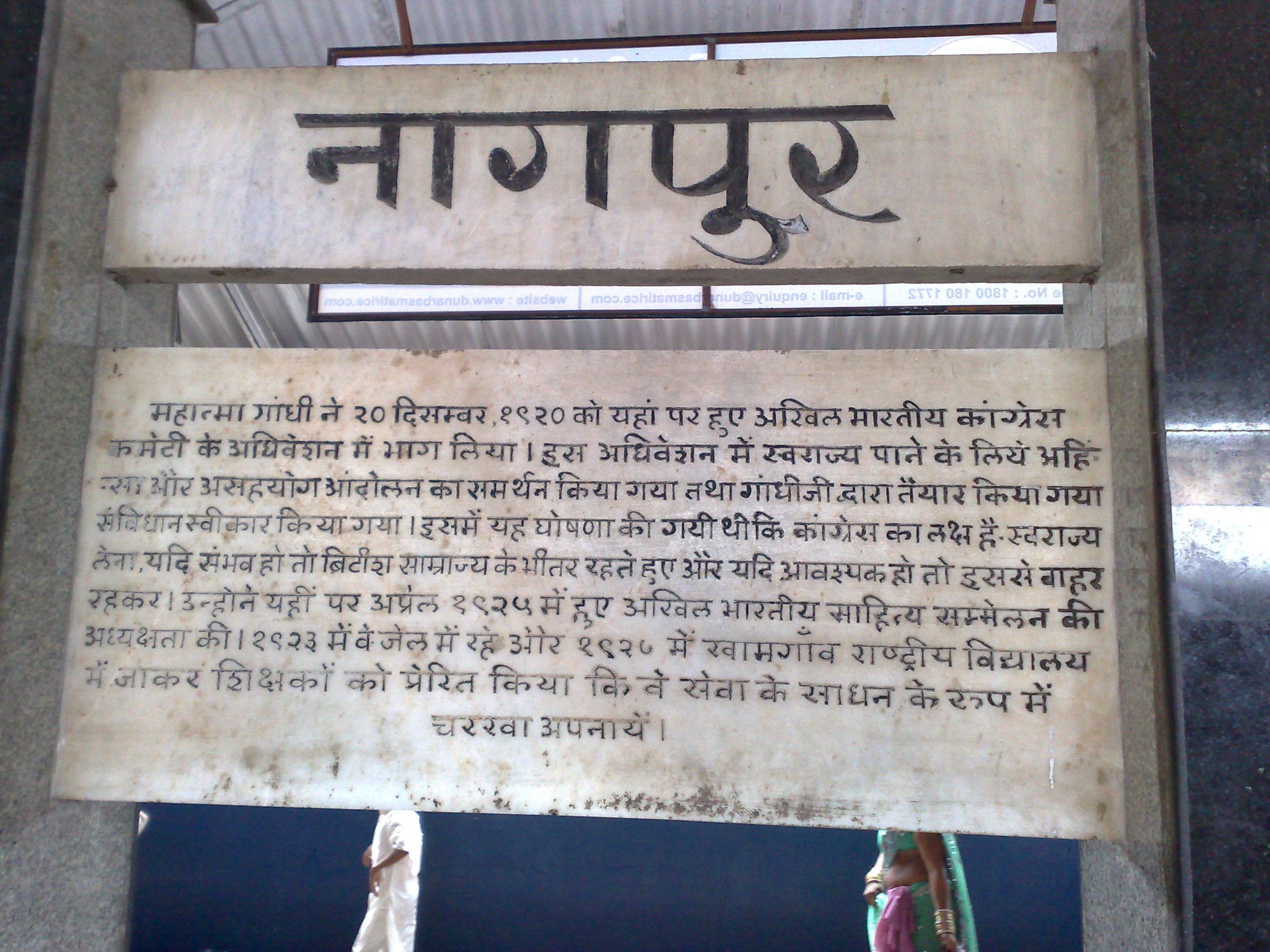
Info tablet at the station

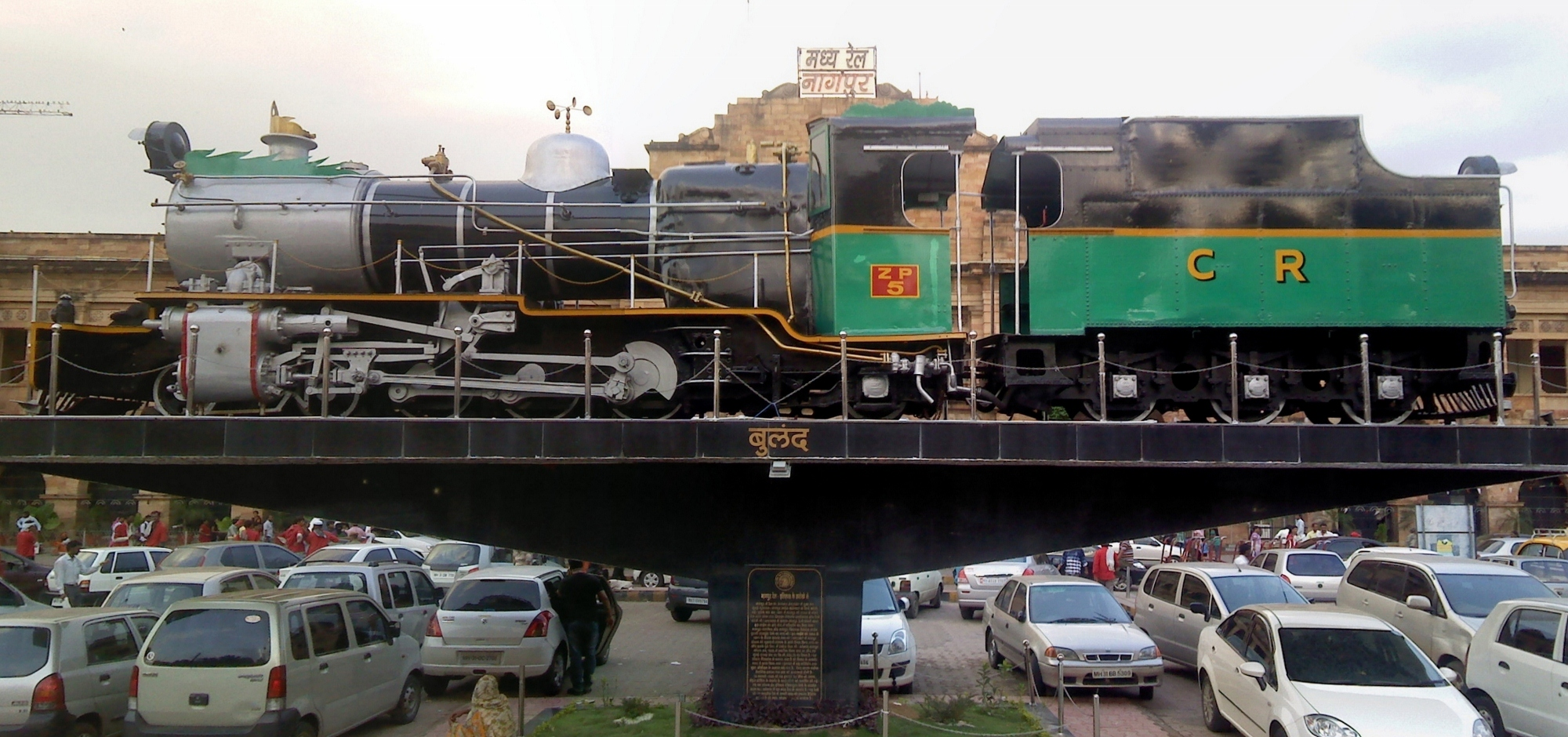
Buland engine at the display
