= Nagpur Mahanagar Parivahan Limited =

- Parent: Nagpur Municipal Corporation
- Founded: 2010
- Locale: Nagpur metropolitan area
- Service area: Nagpur, Maharashtra, India
- Service type: Commuter bus
- Fleet: 730
- Daily ridership: 2 Lakhs

Nagpur Mahanagar Parivahan Limited is a special purpose vehicle of the Nagpur Municipal Corporation to run transport services within Nagpur city.

== Operations ==
In 2007, the Nagpur Municipal Corporation signed an agreement with a private party to purchase the buses and operate them under a 'Purchase-Operate-Transfer' model and pay the corporation a fixed royalty per bus. The corporation was also to earn back 50% of its revenue from advertisements on buses.

In 2013, it was announced that the Government of India would fund the corporations plans of building a new bus station at Mor Bhavan and a depot at Dhaba along with the provision of purchasing more buses.

== Fleet ==
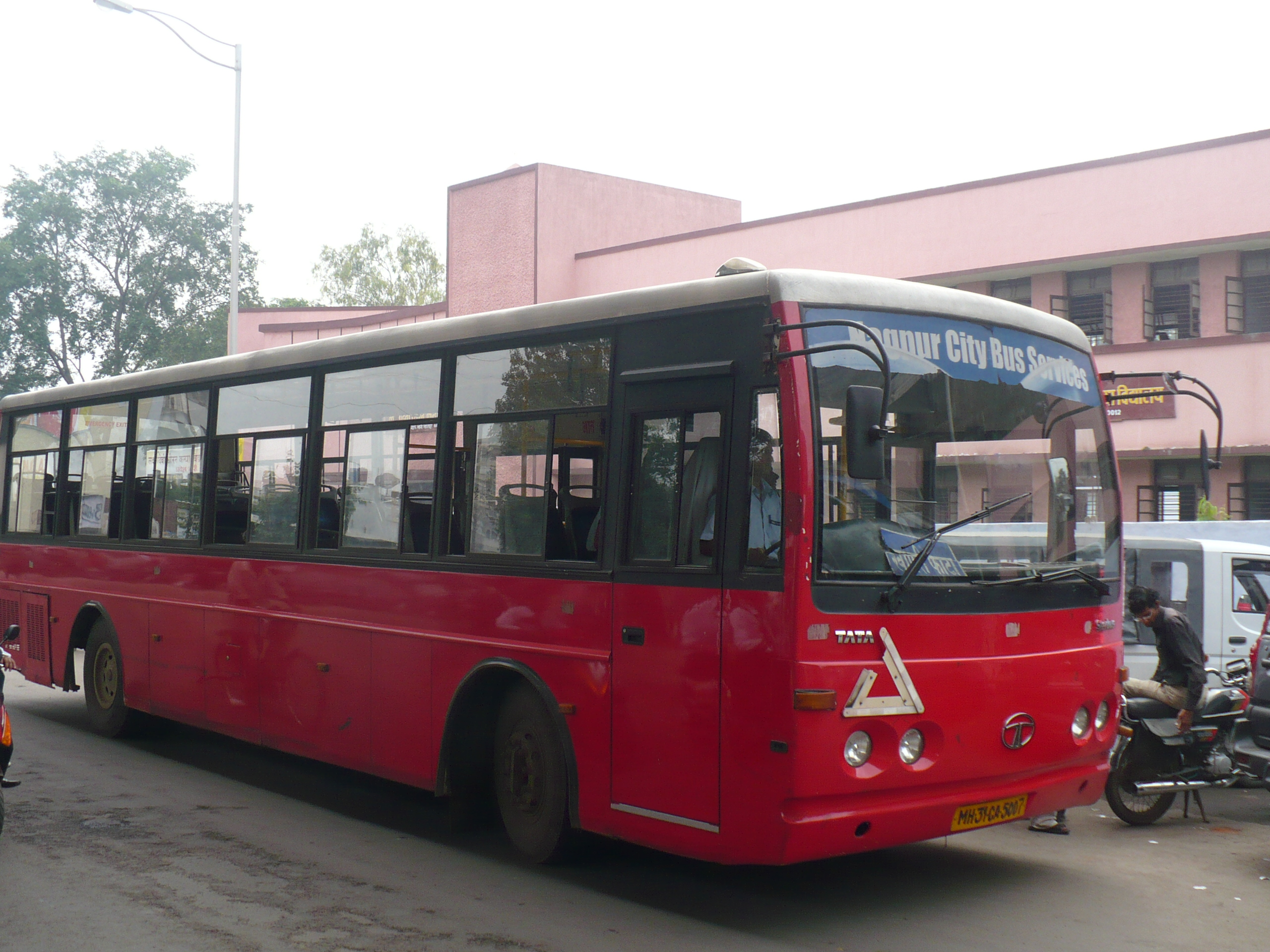
An NMPL bus

The Nagpur Municipal Corporation through its bus operators (three red and one green) plies 730 buses, by which over 200,000 people commute. In 2014, Swedish bus manufacturer Scania AB announced that it would hand over the first ethanol-powered city bus made in India to the Nagpur Municipal Corporation on the recommendation of Nitin Gadkari, Union Minister for Transport, for trial runs. The Ministry requested clearance from the Automotive Research Association of India (ARAI) in order to amend the Motor Vehicles Act of 1988 to legally recognise ethanol as a commercial fuel type.
