= Butibori =

Butibori Bori
- Industrial Suburb
- Location in Maharashtra, India
- Coordinates: 20°56′01″N 79°00′08″E
- Country: India
- State: Maharashtra
- District: Nagpur

Area
  - Total: 8 km^{2} (3.1 sq mi)

Population (2011)
  - Total: 12,072
  - Density: 1,500/km^{2} (3,900/sq mi)

Languages
  - Official: Marathi
- Time zone: UTC+5:30 (IST)
- PIN: 441108
- Telephone code: 07103
- Vehicle registration: MH-40
- Nearest city: Hingna
- Sex ratio: 914:1000 ♂/♀
- Literacy: 91%
- Lok Sabha constituency: Ramtek (Lok Sabha constituency)
- Vidhan Sabha constituency: Hingna Assembly region

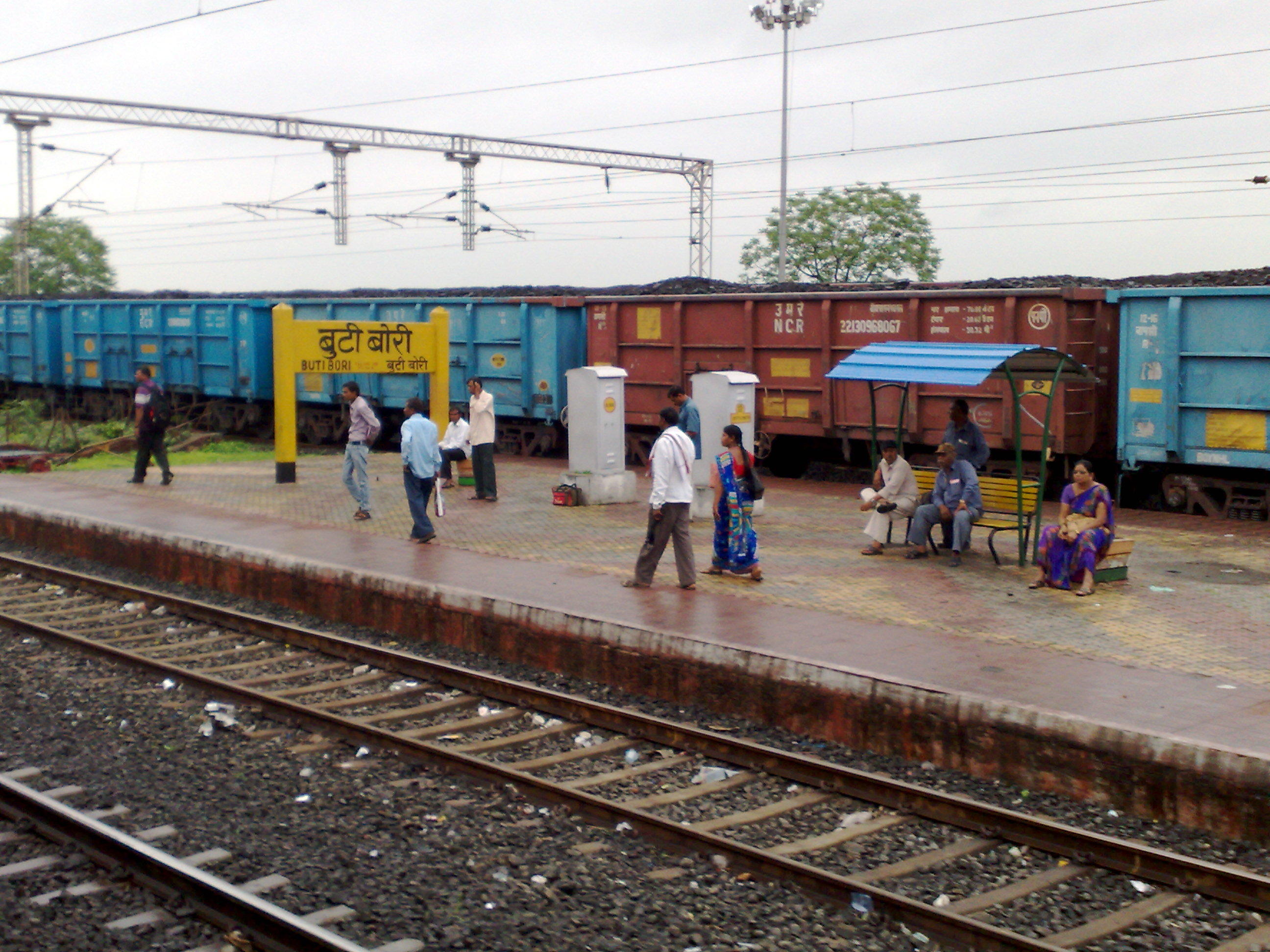
ButiBori Railway Station

Butibori is an industrial suburb of Nagpur, India and is developed as 5 Star Industrial district by Maharashtra Industrial Development Corporation (MIDC). Butibori's total area acquired is 23.12 square kilometres out of which 14.94 km^{2} is developed. The area is developed economic development of Nagpur city. The area receives water supply from Wadgaon Dam. Butibori also claims Maharashtra's first Food-Park. In order to invite textile industries a common effluent treatment plant is also built. Maharashtra Industries Development Corporation has acquired additional 3,750 acres. Butibori is named after the Buti family of Nagpur.

It is served by the Buti Bori railway station.

The number of industries operating in the area is around 100, with around 35 under construction. Butibori Industrial Area spans a total area of 1,500 hectares.

== See also ==
- Hingna
