= List of Surat Metro stations =

This is a list of all stations of the Surat Metro, an under-construction rapid transit system serving Surat City and Surat Metropolitan Region in the state of Gujarat, India. The Surat Metro will be the sixth transit system to be built in India. Construction was started on 18 January 2021 with two lines, the Red Line and Green Line, with a total of 38 station. The project is expected to be completed by December 2027, and will cover a distance of 41 kilometers.

The metro network will allow Surat to connect with Sarthana to DREAM City (22 km (14 mi)) and from Bhesan Depot to Saroli (18 km (11 mi)).

Each line of the Surat Metro is identified by a specific color. The first corridor, from Sarthana to DREAM City, will be known as the Red Line, and the second corridor, from Bhesan Depot to Saroli, will be known as the Green Line.

The system uses rolling stocks of standard gauge trains and has a combination of elevated, underground and at-grade lines.

== Metro stations ==
| Station name | | Line | Layout | Platform layout | Status | Notes | Ref. |
| English | Gujarati | Line | Layout | Platform layout | Status | Notes | Ref. |
|---|---|---|---|---|---|---|---|
| Adajan Gam | અડાજણ ગામ | Line 2 | Elevated | Side | Under construction | – | |
| Althan Tenament | અલથાણ ટેનામેન્ટ | Line 1 | Elevated | Side | Under construction | – | |
| Althan Gam | અલથાણ ગામ | Line 1 | Elevated | Side | Under construction | – | |
| Anjana Farm | અંજના ફાર્મ | Line 2 | Elevated | Side | Under construction | – | |
| Athwa Chopati | અઠવા ચોપાટી | Line 2 | Elevated | Side | Under construction | – | |
| Badri Narayan Temple | બદ્રી નારાયણ ટેમ્પલ | Line 2 | Elevated | Side | Under construction | – | |
| Bharat Cancer Hospital | ભારત કેન્સર હોસ્પિટલ | Line 2 | Elevated | Side | Under construction | – | |
| Bheshan | ભેસાણ | Line 2 | Elevated | Side | Under construction | – | |
| Bhimrad | ભીમરાડ | Line 1 | Elevated | Side | Under construction | – | |
| Botanical Garden | બોટનિકલ ગાર્ડન | Line 2 | Elevated | Side | Under construction | – | |
| Central Warehouse | સેન્ટ્રલ વેરહાઉસ | Line 1 | Underground | Side | Under construction | – | |
| Convention Center | કન્વેન્શન સેન્ટર | Line 1 | Elevated | Side | Under construction | – | |
| DREAM City | ડ્રીમ સિટી | Line 1 | Elevated | Side | Under construction | – | |
| Gandhi Baug | ગાંધીબાગ | Line 1 | Underground | Side | Under construction | – | |
| Jagdishchandra Bose Aquarium | જગદીશચંદ્ર બોસ એક્વેરિયમ | Line 2 | Elevated | Side | Under construction | – | |
| Kadarsha Ni Naal | કાદરશા ની નાળ | Line 1 | Elevated | Side | Under construction | – | |
| Kamela Darwaja | કમેલા દરવાજા | Line 2 | Elevated | Side | Under construction | – | |
| Kapodra | કાપોદ્રા | Line 1 | Underground | Side | Under construction | – | |
| Labheshwar Chowk | લાભેશ્વર ચોક | Line 1 | Underground | Side | Under construction | – | |
| LP Savani School | એલ.પી.સવાણી સ્કૂલ | Line 2 | Elevated | Side | Under construction | – | |
| Magob | મગોબ | Line 2 | Elevated | Side | Under construction | – | |
| Majura Gate | મજુરા ગેટ | Line 1 Line 2 | Elevated | Side | Under construction | Interchange with Line 1 & Line 2 | |
| Maskati Hospital | મસ્કતી હોસ્પિટલ | Line 1 | Underground | Side | Under construction | – | |
| Model Town | મોડલ ટાઉન | Line 2 | Elevated | Side | Under construction | – | |
| Nature Park | નેચર પાર્ક | Line 1 | Elevated | Side | Under construction | – | |
| Palanpur Road | પાલનપુર રોડ | Line 2 | Elevated | Side | Under construction | – | |
| Performing Art Centre | પર્ફોર્મિંગ આર્ટ સેન્ટર | Line 2 | Elevated | Side | Under construction | – | |
| Rupali Canal | રૂપાલી કેનાલ | Line 1 | Elevated | Side | Under construction | – | |
| Sarthana | સરથાણા | Line 1 | Elevated | Side | Under construction | – | |
| Saroli | સારોલી | Line 2 | Elevated | Side | Under construction | – | |
| Shri Swaminarayan Mandir Kalakunj | શ્રી સ્વામિનારાયણ મંદિર કલાકુંજ | Line 1 | Elevated | Side | Under construction | – | |
| Surat Railway Station | સુરત રેલ્વે સ્ટેશન | Line 1 | Underground | Side | Under construction | Transfer station to Surat Railway Station | |
| Udhna Darwaja | ઉધના દરવાજા | Line 2 | Elevated | Side | Under construction | – | |
| Ugat Varigruh | ઉગત વરિગૃહ | Line 2 | Elevated | Side | Under construction | – | |
| Varachha Chopati Garden | વરાછા ચોપાટી ગાર્ડન | Line 1 | Elevated | Side | Under construction | – | |
| VIP Road | વી.આઈ.પી રોડ | Line 1 | Elevated | Side | Under construction | – | |
| Woman ITI | વુમન આઈ.ટી.આઈ | Line 1 | Elevated | Side | Under construction | – | |

== Statistics ==
| Total number of metro stations | 38 |
| Total number of metro stations under construction | 38 |
| Number of interchange stations | 1 |
| Number of elevated stations | 32 |
| Number of underground stations | 6 |
| Number of at-grade stations | 0 |

== See also ==
- List of Ahmedabad Metro stations
- List of Chennai Metro stations
- List of Coimbatore Metro stations
- List of Delhi Metro stations
- List of Hyderabad Metro stations
- List of Jaipur Metro stations
- List of Kochi Metro stations
- List of Kolkata Metro stations
- List of Lucknow Metro stations
- List of Madurai Metro stations
- List of Mumbai Metro stations
- List of Noida Metro stations
- List of Nagpur Metro stations
- List of Namma Metro stations
- List of Navi Mumbai Metro Stations
- List of Pune Metro stations
