= Cotton Market metro station =

Nagpur Metro's Aqua Line metro station

Cotton Market

General information
- Location: Cotton Market, Nagpur, Maharashtra 440012
- Coordinates: 21.14058°N 79.07776°E
- System: Nagpur Metro station
- Owner: Maharashtra Metro Rail Corporation Limited (MAHA-METRO)
- Operator: Nagpur Metro
- Line: Aqua Line
- Platforms: Side platform Platform-1 → Prajapati Nagar; Platform-2 → Lokmanya Nagar
- Tracks: 2

Construction
- Structure type: Elevated, Double track
- Platform levels: 2
- Accessible: Yes

History
- Opened: 21 September 2023; 2 years ago
- Electrified: 25 kV 50 Hz AC overhead catenary

Services
Preceding station	Nagpur Metro	Following station
Nagpur Railway Station towards Prajapati Nagar	Aqua Line	Sitabuldi towards Lokmanya Nagar
Route map
Location

Cotton Market is an elevated metro station on the East-West corridor of the Aqua Line of Nagpur Metro in Nagpur, India. It was opened on 21 September 2023.

== Station layout ==
G	Street level	Exit/Entrance
L1	Mezzanine	Fare control, station agent, Metro Card vending machines, crossover
L2	Side platform | Doors will open on the left
L2	Platform 1 Eastbound	Towards → Prajapati Nagar; Next Station: Nagpur Railway Station
L2	Platform 2 Westbound	Towards ← Lokmanya Nagar; Next Station: Sitabuldi Change at the next station for Orange Line
L2	Side platform | Doors will open on the left
L2

== See also ==
- Nagpur
- List of Nagpur Metro stations
