= Ambedkar Square metro station =

Nagpur Metro's Aqua Line metro station

Ambedkar Square

General information
- Location: Shashtri Nagar, Nagpur, Maharashtra 440008
- Coordinates: 21.14828°N 79.12956°E
- System: Nagpur Metro station
- Owner: Maharashtra Metro Rail Corporation Limited (MAHA-METRO)
- Operator: Nagpur Metro
- Line: Aqua Line
- Platforms: Side platform Platform-1 → Prajapati Nagar; Platform-2 → Lokmanya Nagar
- Tracks: 2

Construction
- Structure type: Elevated, Double track
- Platform levels: 2
- Accessible: Yes

Other information
- Status: Operational

History
- Opening: 12 December 2022; 3 years ago
- Electrified: 750 V DC third rail

Services
Preceding station	Nagpur Metro	Following station
Vaishnodevi Square towards Prajapati Nagar	Aqua Line	Telephone Exchange towards Lokmanya Nagar
Route map
Location

Ambedkar Square is an elevated metro station on the East-West Corridor of the Aqua Line of Nagpur Metro in Nagpur, India. This metro station was inaugurated on 11 December 2022 by Prime Minister Narendra Modi and was opened to the public on 12 December 2022.

== Station layout ==
G	Street level	Exit/Entrance
L1	Mezzanine	Fare control, station agent, Metro Card vending machines, crossover
L2	Side platform | Doors will open on the left
L2	Platform 1 Eastbound	Towards → Prajapati Nagar; Next Station: Vaishno Devi Square
L2	Platform 2 Westbound	Towards ← Lokmanya Nagar; Next Station: Telephone Exchange
L2	Side platform | Doors will open on the left
L2

== See also ==
- Nagpur
- Maharashtra
- List of Nagpur Metro stations
- Rapid transit in India
