= Subhash Nagar metro station (Nagpur) =

Nagpur Metro's Aqua Line metro station

Subhash Nagar
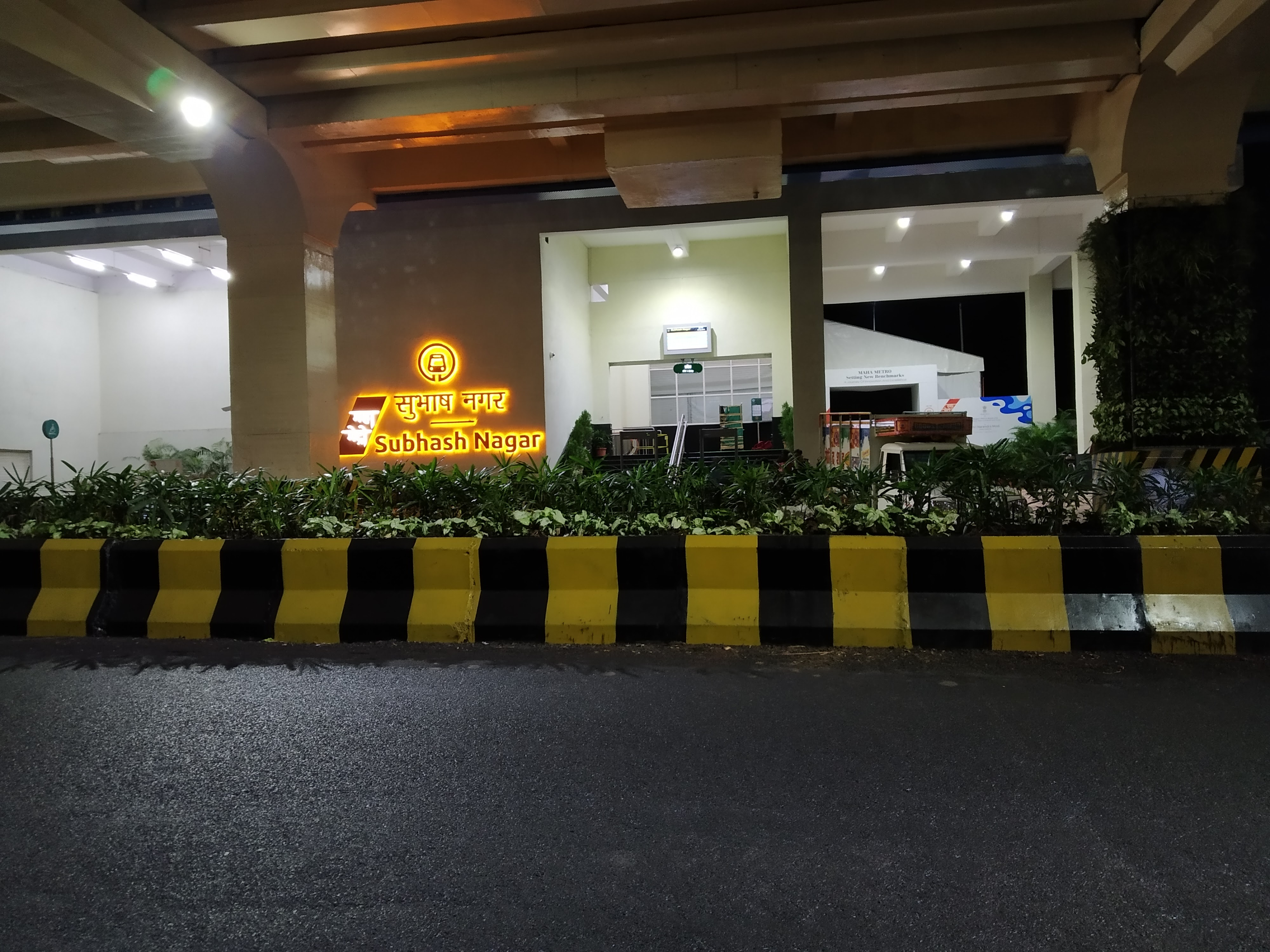

General information
- Location: Parsodi, Nagpur, Maharashtra 440022
- Coordinates: 21.12330°N 79.04194°E
- System: Nagpur Metro station
- Owner: Maharashtra Metro Rail Corporation Limited (MAHA-METRO)
- Operator: Nagpur Metro
- Line: Aqua Line
- Platforms: Side platform Platform-1 → Prajapati Nagar; Platform-2 → Lokmanya Nagar
- Tracks: 2

Construction
- Structure type: Elevated, Double track
- Platform levels: 2
- Accessible: Yes

History
- Opened: 28 January 2020; 6 years ago
- Electrified: 25 kV 50 Hz AC overhead catenary

Services
Preceding station	Nagpur Metro	Following station
Dharampeth College towards Prajapati Nagar	Aqua Line	Rachana Ring Road Junction towards Lokmanya Nagar
Route map
Location

Subhash Nagar is an elevated metro station on the East-West corridor of the Aqua Line of Nagpur Metro in Nagpur, India. It was opened on 28 January 2020.

== Station layout ==
G	Street level	Exit/Entrance
L1	Mezzanine	Fare control, station agent, Metro Card vending machines, crossover
L2	Side platform | Doors will open on the left
L2	Platform 1 Eastbound	Towards → Prajapati Nagar; Next Station: Dharampeth College
L2	Platform 2 Westbound	Towards ← Lokmanya Nagar; Next Station: Rachana Ring Road Jn.
L2	Side platform | Doors will open on the left
L2

== See also ==
- Nagpur
- Maharashtra
- List of Nagpur Metro stations
- Rapid transit in India
