= Vasudev Nagar metro station =

Nagpur Metro's Aqua Line metro station

Madhav Netralaya Vasudev Nagar
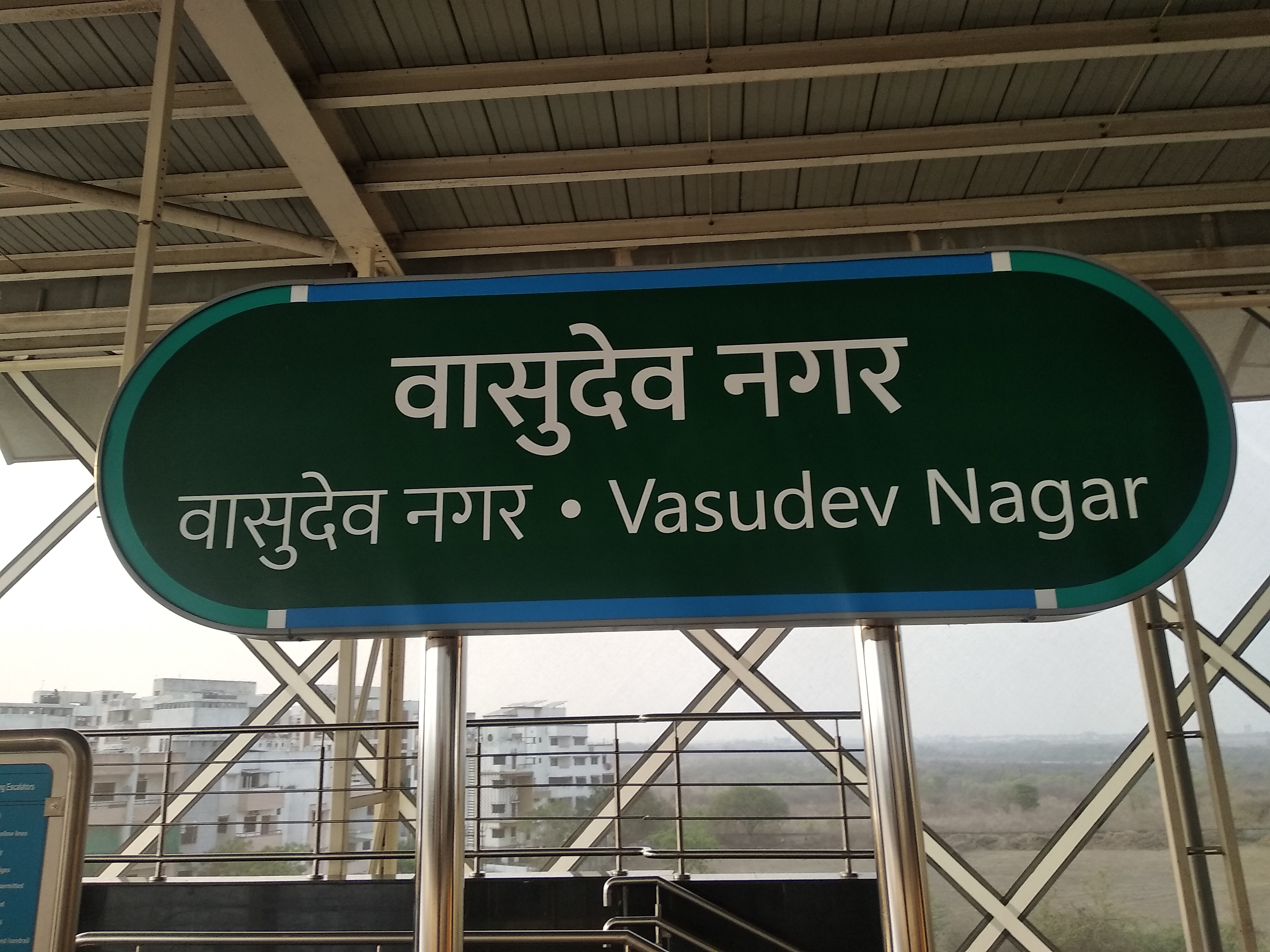

General information
- Location: Rajendra Nagar, Nagpur, Maharashtra 440016
- Coordinates: 21.11876°N 79.01950°E
- System: Nagpur Metro station
- Owner: Maharashtra Metro Rail Corporation Limited (MAHA-METRO)
- Operator: Nagpur Metro
- Line: Aqua Line
- Platforms: Side platform Platform-1 → Prajapati Nagar; Platform-2 → Lokmanya Nagar
- Tracks: 2

Construction
- Structure type: Elevated, Double track
- Platform levels: 2
- Accessible: Yes

History
- Opened: 28 January 2020; 6 years ago
- Electrified: 25 kV 50 Hz AC overhead catenary

Services
Preceding station	Nagpur Metro	Following station
Rachana Ring Road Junction towards Prajapati Nagar	Aqua Line	Bansi Nagar towards Lokmanya Nagar
Route map
Location

Madhav Netralaya Vasudev Nagar formerly known as Vasudev Nagar is an elevated metro station on the East-West corridor of the Aqua Line of Nagpur Metro in Nagpur, India. It was opened on 28 January 2020.

== Station layout ==
G	Street level	Exit/Entrance
L1	Mezzanine	Fare control, station agent, Metro Card vending machines, crossover
L2	Side platform | Doors will open on the left
L2	Platform 1 Eastbound	Towards → Prajapati Nagar; Next Station: Rachana Ring Road Jn.
L2	Platform 2 Westbound	Towards ← Lokmanya Nagar; Next Station: Bansi Nagar
L2	Side platform | Doors will open on the left
L2

== See also ==
- Nagpur
- Maharashtra
- List of Nagpur Metro stations
- Rapid transit in India
