= Dharampeth College metro station =

Nagpur Metro's Aqua Line metro station

Dharampeth College
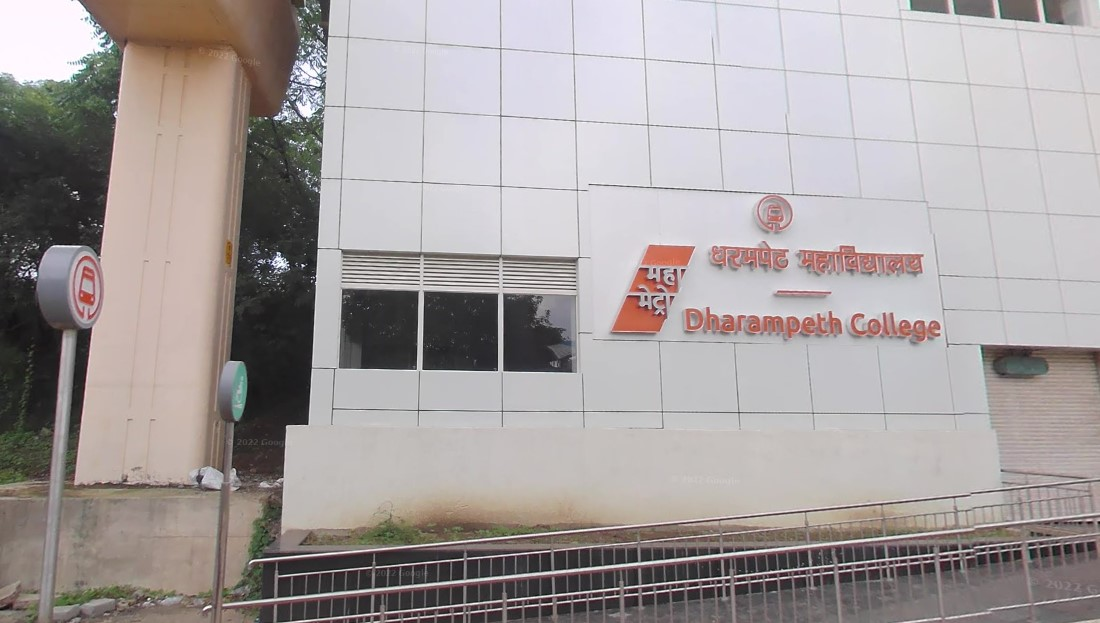

General information
- Location: Ambazari - Hingna Rd, Rajendra Nagar, Nagpur, Maharashtra 440033
- Coordinates: 21.12865°N 79.04574°E
- System: Nagpur Metro station
- Owner: Maharashtra Metro Rail Corporation Limited (MAHA-METRO)
- Operator: Nagpur Metro
- Line: Aqua Line
- Platforms: Side platform Platform-1 → Prajapati Nagar; Platform-2 → Lokmanya Nagar
- Tracks: 2

Construction
- Structure type: Elevated, Double track
- Platform levels: 2
- Accessible: Yes

History
- Opened: 6 April 2021; 5 years ago
- Electrified: 25 kV 50 Hz AC overhead catenary

Services
Preceding station	Nagpur Metro	Following station
LAD Square towards Prajapati Nagar	Aqua Line	Subhash Nagar towards Lokmanya Nagar
Route map
Location

Dharampeth College is an elevated metro station on the East-West corridor of the Aqua Line of Nagpur Metro in Nagpur, India. The station was designed on an aqua theme and covers an area of 5,427.03 square meters.

== Station layout ==
G	Street level	Exit/Entrance
L1	Mezzanine	Fare control, station agent, Metro Card vending machines, crossover
L2	Side platform | Doors will open on the left
L2	Platform 1 Eastbound	Towards → Prajapati Nagar; Next Station: LAD Square
L2	Platform 2 Westbound	Towards ← Lokmanya Nagar; Next Station: Subhash Nagar
L2	Side platform | Doors will open on the left
L2

== See also ==
- Nagpur
- Maharashtra
- List of Nagpur Metro stations
- Rapid transit in India
