= Jhansi Rani Square metro station =

Nagpur Metro's Aqua Line metro station

Jhansi Rani Square
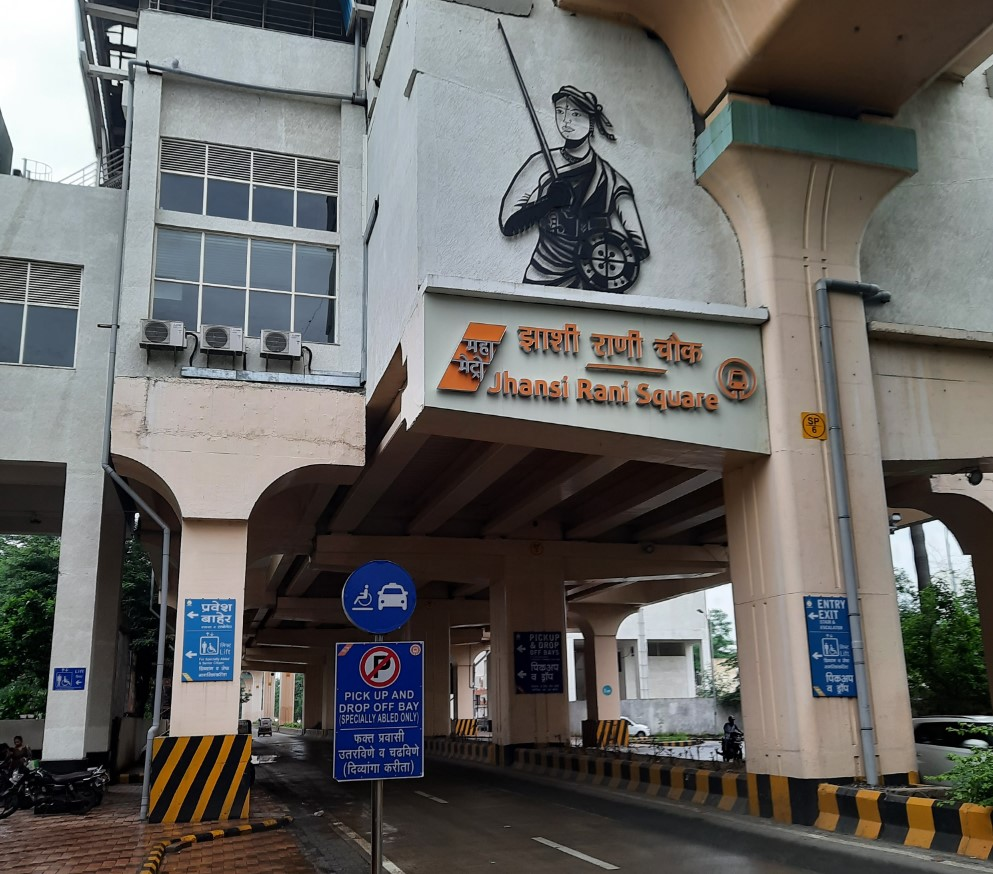

General information
- Location: Ramdaspeth, Nagpur, Maharashtra 440012
- Coordinates: 21.14058°N 79.07776°E
- System: Nagpur Metro station
- Owner: Maharashtra Metro Rail Corporation Limited (MAHA-METRO)
- Operator: Nagpur Metro
- Line: Aqua Line
- Platforms: Side platform Platform-1 → Prajapati Nagar; Platform-2 → Lokmanya Nagar
- Tracks: 2

Construction
- Structure type: Elevated, Double track
- Platform levels: 2
- Accessible: Yes

History
- Opened: 28 January 2020; 6 years ago
- Electrified: 25 kV 50 Hz AC overhead catenary

Services
Preceding station	Nagpur Metro	Following station
Sitabuldi towards Prajapati Nagar	Aqua Line	Institution of Engineers towards Lokmanya Nagar
Route map
Location

Jhansi Rani Square is an elevated metro station on the East-West corridor of the Aqua Line of Nagpur Metro in Nagpur, India. It was opened on 28 January 2020.

A mural of Rani Lakshmibai was installed on the station's facade in September 2020. The mural was designed by Deepti Deshpande of Hastankit, and is made of mild steel. It measures 16.5 feet by 9 feet and weighs about 200 kg.

== Station layout ==
G	Street level	Exit/Entrance
L1	Mezzanine	Fare control, station agent, Metro Card vending machines, crossover
L2	Side platform | Doors will open on the left
L2	Platform 1 Eastbound	Towards → Prajapati Nagar; Next Station: Sitabuldi Change at the next station for Orange Line
L2	Platform 2 Westbound	Towards ← Lokmanya Nagar; Next Station: Institution of Engineers
L2	Side platform | Doors will open on the left
L2

== See also ==
- Nagpur
- Maharashtra
- List of Nagpur Metro stations
- Rapid transit in India
