= VIP Road metro station =

VIP Road metro station may refer to:

- VIP Road metro station (Kolkata) on Orange Line (Kolkata Metro)
- VIP Road metro station (Surat) on Line 1 (Surat Metro)
