= List of largest office buildings =

This is a list of the largest office buildings in the world, ranked by total floor area in square meters (m^{2}). Office buildings included in this list are structures predominantly used as a commercial office space. Mixed-use buildings where office space does not form a majority of the floor area are not included in this list. All floors within the standalone structure of a building are considered, which includes basements. Parking area is included in the measurement only if it is an integral part of the structure, such as a multi-level basement or stilt parking within the same building.

== Largest office buildings in the world ==
This list ranks the largest office buildings in the world by floor area. To be included in the list, a building must have a majority of its floor area used as a commercial office space, and have a total floor area of approximately 100,000 m^{2} (1,100,000 sq ft) or more. The "Year" column indicates the year in which a building was completed. Buildings that are still under construction but have been topped out are included.

Largest office buildings by total area
Building	City	Country	Floor area (m^{2})	Height (ft)	Height (m)	Floors	Year	Employees
Surat Diamond Bourse	Surat, Gujarat	India	660,000	268	81.9	15	2023	65,000
The Pentagon	Arlington, Virginia	United States	620,000	77	23.5	7	1943	26,000
Chrysler World Headquarters and Technology Center	Auburn Hills, Michigan	United States	490,000	249	76	15	1993 (technology center); 1996 (headquarters)	~11,000
SAS iTower A	Hyderabad	India	484,586	505	154	37	2025	
USAA Corporate Headquarters	San Antonio, Texas	United States	476,000	50	15.25	4	1976	15,000
Azabudai Hills Mori JP Tower	Tokyo	Japan	461,774	1067	325.2	64	2023	20,000
The Exchange 106	Kuala Lumpur	Malaysia	453,835	1,462	445.5	95	2019	
Willis Tower	Chicago	United States	416,000	1,451	442	108	1974	~15,000
Petronas Twin Towers	Kuala Lumpur	Malaysia	395,000	1,483	451.9	88	1996	
CCTV Headquarters	Beijing	China	389,079	768	234	51	2012	~10,000
Ping An Finance Centre	Shenzhen	China	459,000	1,965	599.1	115	2017	~15,500
Shanghai World Financial Center	Shanghai	China	381,600	1,614	492	101	2008	
Roppongi Hills Mori Tower	Tokyo	Japan	380,105	781	238	54	2003	
Shanghai Tower	Shanghai	China	380,000	2,073	632	128	2014	
Merchandise Mart	Chicago	United States	372,000	340	100	25	1930	
ICICI Regional Hub Building	Hyderabad	India	371,000	230	70	20	2011	~22,000
Long'ao Building	Jinan	China	370,000	218	66	15	2007	
Palace of the Parliament	Bucharest	Romania	365,000	276	84	12	1997	
Cœur Défense	La Défense	France	350,000	591	180	39	2001	
Aon Center	Chicago	United States	334,451	1,136	346	83	1973	
One World Trade Center	New York City	United States	325,279	1,776	541.3	104	2014	
55 Water Street	New York City	United States	325,000	687	209	53	1972	
Burj Khalifa	Dubai	United Arab Emirates	309,473	2,722	828	160	2010	
Lotte World Tower	Seoul	South Korea	304,081	1,823	555	123	2016	
Taipei 101	Taipei	Taiwan	294,258	1,671	508.6	101	2004	
MetLife Building	New York City	United States	292,000	808	246	59	1963	
Ronald Reagan Building	Washington DC	United States	290,000			15	1998	
IBM Rochester	Rochester, Minnesota	United States	290,000			3	1958	
Shun Hing Square	Shenzhen	China	280,000	1,260	384	69	1996	
Amazon office Hyderabad	Hyderabad	India	278,000	282	85.9	15	2019	~15,000
Brookfield Place (Toronto)	Toronto	Canada	276,110	856	261	53	1990	
International Commerce Centre	Hong Kong	Hong Kong	274,064	1,587	484	108	2010	
111 Eighth Avenue	New York City	United States	270,000	264	80	18	1932	
John Hancock Center	Chicago	United States	260,126	1,128	344	100	1969	
Apple Park	Cupertino	United States	260,000	49	15	4	2017	12,000
First Canadian Place	Toronto	Canada	250,849	978	298	72	1976	
Place du Portage III	Gatineau	Canada	247,000	233.9	71.3	20	1978	
Nabemba Tower	Brazzaville	Congo Republic	242,168	348	106	30	1986	
30 Hudson Yards	New York City	United States	240,000	1,270	387	103	2019	
World Trade Center Mexico	Mexico City	Mexico	239,000	333	207	50	1994	
Parc1 Tower A	Seoul	South Korea	222,989	1,056	322	69	2020	
KK100	Shenzhen	China	220,000	1,450	442	98	2011	
Petronas Tower 1	Kuala Lumpur	Malaysia	218,000	1,483	452	88	1998	
Petronas Tower 2	Kuala Lumpur	Malaysia	218,000	1,483	452	88	1998	
28 Liberty Street	New York City	United States	213,675	813	248	60	1961	
U.S. Steel Tower	Pittsburgh	United States	210,000	841	256	64	1970	
Empire State Building	New York City	United States	208,879	1,250	381	102	1931	
JPMorgan Chase Tower	Houston	United States	208,382	1,002	305	75	1982	
CITIC Plaza	Guangzhou	China	205,239	1,283	391	80	1997	
Chongqing World Trade Center	Chongqing	China	204,400	929	283	60	2005	
Jamie L. Whitten Building	Washington, D.C.	United States	204,386	60	18	5	1904	
1221 Avenue of the Americas	New York City	United States	204,385	674	205	51	1969	
Chase Tower	Chicago	United States	200,000	850	259	60	1969	
The Summit at Danbury	Danbury, Connecticut	United States	200,000	89	27	6	1982	
The Bow	Calgary, Alberta	Canada	199,781	774	236	58	2013	
Wells Fargo Customer Information Center(CIC)	Charlotte, North Carolina	United States	195,468			3	1995	
Bank of America Tower	New York City	United States	195,095	1,200	366	54	2009	
30 Rockefeller Plaza	New York City	United States	195,095	850	259	69	1933	
22 Bishopsgate	London	United Kingdom	195,000	912	278	62	2020	
Boeing Everett	Everett, Washington	United States	185,806	84	25.6	6	1993	
Two International Finance Centre	Hong Kong	Hong Kong	185,805	1,362	415	88	2003	
McCoy Center	Columbus, Ohio	United States	185,800	64	19.5	4	1996	
555 California Street	San Francisco	United States	183,017	779	237	52	1969	
Bank of America Plaza	Dallas	United States	171,300	921	281	72	1985	
Wells Fargo Plaza	Houston	United States	170,362	992	302	71	1983	
Parc1 Tower B	Seoul	South Korea	170,316	840	256	53	2020	
Renaissance Center Central Tower	Detroit	United States	168,300	727	222	73	1977 (headquarters) (Hotel)	
Hexagone Balard	Paris	France	165,000				2015	~10,000
Almas Tower	Dubai	United Arab Emirates	160,000	1,191	363	68	2009	
Franklin Center	Chicago	United States	158,000	1,007	307	60	1989	
10 Hudson Yards	New York City	United States	158,000	878	268	52	2016	
Boca Raton Innovation Campus (BRiC)	Boca Raton, Florida	United States	157,935	45	14	3	1967	
Major General Emmett J. Bean Finance Center	Indianapolis	United States	154,219			3	1953	~5,000
4 Times Square	New York City	United States	150,000	809	247	48	1999	
Telekom Tower	Kuala Lumpur	Malaysia	150,000	1,017	310	55	2001	
Salesforce Tower	San Francisco	United States	150,000	1,070	326	61	2018	
Scotia Plaza	Toronto	Canada	149,000	902	275	68	1988	
Citigroup Center	New York City	United States	146,683	915	279	59	1977	
Verizon Operations Headquarters	Basking Ridge, New Jersey	United States	145,153			4	1975	
One Island East	Hong Kong	Hong Kong	144,426	979	298	69	2008	
Key Tower	Cleveland, Ohio	United States	144,000	947	289	57	1991	
New York Times Tower	New York City	United States	143,000	1,046	319	52	2007	
Columbia Center	Seattle	United States	142,900	937	285	76	1985	
Plaza 66	Shanghai	China	140,263	945	288	66	2001	
Harry S Truman Building	Washington, DC	United States	140,000	100	30	8	1941; 1960	8,000
Bank of China Tower	Hong Kong	Hong Kong	135,000	1,205	367.4	72	1990	
US Bank Tower	Los Angeles	United States	133,087	1,018	310	73	1989	
Central Plaza	Hong Kong	Hong Kong	130,140	1,227	374	78	1992	
Bank of America Corporate Center	Charlotte, North Carolina	United States	130,063	871	265	60	1992	
The Center	Hong Kong	Hong Kong	130,032	1,135	346	73	1998	
Brookfield Place (Calgary)	Calgary, Alberta	Canada	130,000	810	247	56	2017	
The Shard	London	United Kingdom	127,071	725	221	72	2012	
Shanghai Wheelock Square	Shanghai	China	114,075	978	298	58	2009	
311 South Wacker Drive	Chicago	United States	130,000	961	293	65	1990	
Two Prudential Plaza	Chicago	United States	130,000	995	303	64	1990	
Comcast Center	Philadelphia	United States	130,000	973	297	57	2008	
Cadillac Place	Detroit	United States	129,600	220	67	15	1922	~2,000
Bank of America Plaza	Atlanta	United States	121,980	1,023	312	55	1992	
Palazzo della Farnesina	Rome	Italy	120,000	167	51	62	1959	
Place du Portage IV	Gatineau	Canada	118,000	229.7	70	18	1979	
Cheung Kong Centre	Hong Kong	Hong Kong	117,000	928	283	62	1999	
Aon Center	Los Angeles	United States	116,128	858	262	62	1973	
One Canada Square	London	United Kingdom	113,726	770	235	50	1991	
One Liberty Place	Philadelphia	United States	111,483	945	288	61	1987	
Richard Bolling Federal Building	Kansas City, Missouri	United States	111,483	295	98.33	18	1965	
Truist Plaza	Atlanta	United States	111,400	871	265	60	1992	
Chrysler Building	New York City	United States	111,000	1,046	319	77	1930	
Minsheng Bank Building	Wuhan	China	110,000	1,087	331	68	2007	
One Atlantic Center	Atlanta	United States	100,000	820	250	50	1987	
Emirates Office Tower	Dubai	United Arab Emirates	100,000	1,163	355	54	2000	

== See also ==
- List of tallest hotels in the world
- List of tallest residential buildings in the world
