= Nagpur Railway Station metro station =

Nagpur Metro's Aqua Line metro station

Nagpur Railway Station

General information
- Location: Santra Market, 4, Mominpura, Nagpur, Maharashtra 440018
- Coordinates: 21.15114°N 79.09044°E
- System: Nagpur Metro station
- Owner: Maharashtra Metro Rail Corporation Limited (MAHA-METRO)
- Operator: Nagpur Metro
- Line: Aqua Line
- Platforms: Side platform Platform-1 → Prajapati Nagar; Platform-2 → Lokmanya Nagar
- Tracks: 2
- Connections: Nagpur Junction

Construction
- Structure type: Elevated, Double track
- Platform levels: 2
- Accessible: Yes

Other information
- Status: Operational

History
- Opening: 12 December 2022; 3 years ago
- Electrified: 750 V DC third rail

Services
Preceding station	Nagpur Metro	Following station
Dosar Vaishya Square towards Prajapati Nagar	Aqua Line ** Skipping Cotton Market	Sitabuldi towards Lokmanya Nagar
Route map
Location

Nagpur Railway Station is an important elevated metro station on the East-West Corridor of the Aqua Line of Nagpur Metro in Nagpur, India. This metro stations holds the main Nagpur Junction railway station. This metro station was inaugurated on 11 December 2022 by Prime Minister Narendra Modi and was opened to the public on 12 December 2022.

== Station layout ==
G	Street level	Exit/Entrance
L1	Mezzanine	Fare control, station agent, Metro Card vending machines, crossover
L2	Side platform | Doors will open on the left
L2	Platform 1 Eastbound	Towards → Prajapati Nagar; Next Station: Dosar Vaishya Square
L2	Platform 2 Westbound	Towards ← Lokmanya Nagar; Next Station: Sitabuldi Change at the next station for Orange Line
L2	Side platform | Doors will open on the left
L2

== See also ==
- Nagpur
- Maharashtra
- List of Nagpur Metro stations
- Rapid transit in India
