= Surat Diamond Bourse =

Diamond trade centre in Gujarat, India

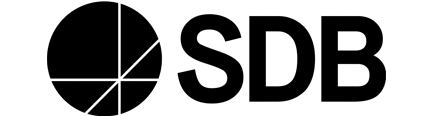

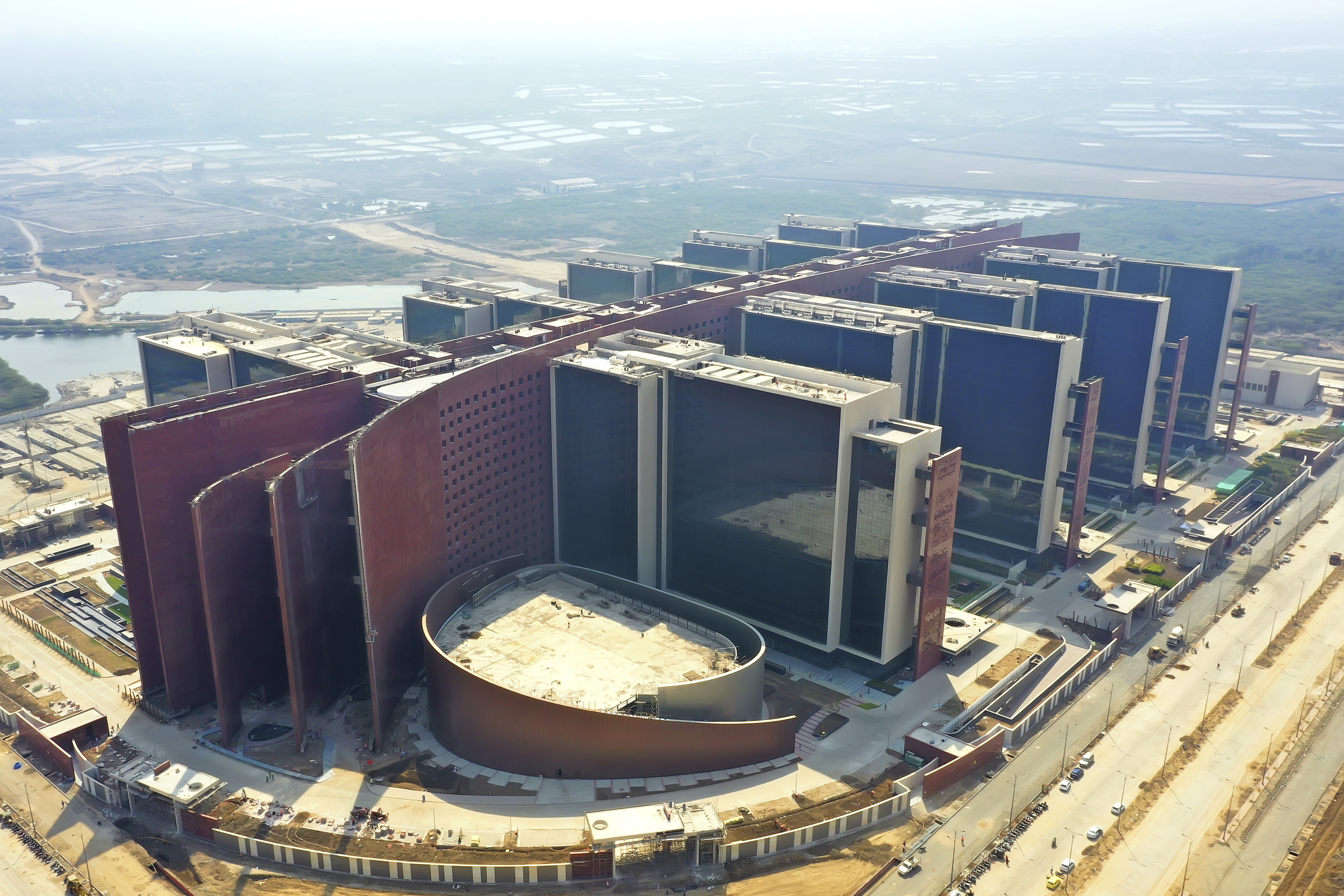
- Alternative names: SDB

General information
- Status: Operational
- Location: DREAM City, Khajod, Gujarat, India, 177/P, Dream City, Khajod, Surat, Surat, India
- Coordinates: 21°6′35″N 72°47′43″E
- Groundbreaking: 16 February 2015
- Construction started: 25 October 2017
- Completed: 26 July 2023
- Inaugurated: 17 December 2023
- Cost: ₹3,200 crore (US$330 million)
- Landlord: DREAM City Company Limited

Height
- Height: 81.9 m (269 ft)

Technical details
- Floor count: 15
- Floor area: 660,000 square metres (7,100,000 sq ft)
- Grounds: 14.38 hectares (35.54 acres)

Design and construction
- Architects: Manit Rastogi; Sonali Rastogi
- Architecture firm: Morphogenesis

Website
- www.suratdiamondbourse.in

Surat Diamond Bourse (SDB) is a diamond trade centre located in DREAM City in Surat, Gujarat, India, designed by the architecture firm Morphogenesis. It is the world's largest office building with a floor space of 660,000 square metres (7,100,000 sq ft). The current chairman is Govind Dholakia and CEO of Surat Diamond Bourse is Mahesh Gadhavi.

== History ==
The SDB project was launched by the former Chief Minister of Gujarat, Anandiben Patel, after the laying the foundation stone for the construction of the complex, as well as of the Diamond Research and Mercantile City, on 15 February 2015. Though the COVID-19 pandemic slowed the construction progress, the pace was increased after restrictions were lifted. The overall structure of the complex was completed in May 2022, and the overall construction was finished on 26 July 2023. It was officially declared as the world's largest office building, surpassing The Pentagon, by the Guinness World Records on 22 August 2023. It was supposed to be inaugurated by Prime Minister Narendra Modi in November 2023, but due to some internal works pending, it was delayed, and was inaugurated and opened on 17 December 2023.

== Structure ==
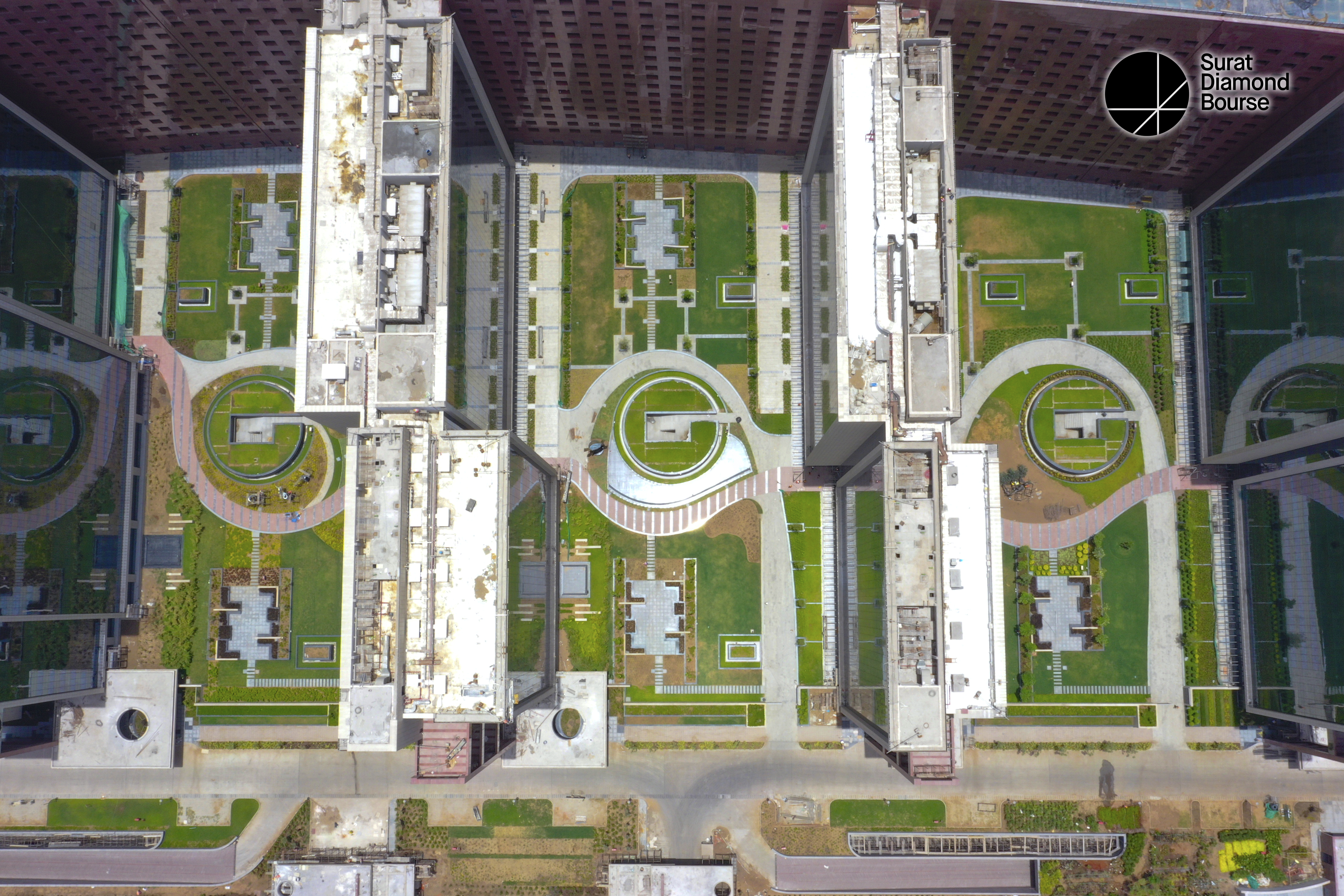
Panchtattva courts between the towers of the SDB complex

The building is located in the core of the Diamond Research and Mercantile City, an upcoming business district. It is spread across 14.38 hectares (35.54 acres) with availability of 61,000 square metres (660,000 square feet) built-up area. The bourse comprises nine interconnected towers, each with 15 floors, accommodating 4,200 offices ranging from 28 square metres (300 square feet) to 700 square metres (7,500 square feet), out of which 2,700 offices are with 28 square metres (300 sq ft) area each in five towers, 900 offices with 46 square metres (500 sq ft) area in one tower, 400 offices with 93 square metres (1,000 sq ft) area in another tower, and two towers offering 350 larger offices exceeding 93 square metres (1,000 sq ft) area. The nine towers are connected with each other by a central corridor, with access to services and facilities similar to an airport terminal. There are nine Panchtattva courts in between the nine buildings, created as recreational and green spaces. There are 131 elevators, with a speed of three meters per second. It has a two-level underground parking space, capable of accommodating 4,500 cars and 10,000 two-wheelers. All of the offices are centrally air-conditioned through a chilled water-cooling system. The building provides amenities such as conference halls, multi-purpose halls, restaurants, banks, and retail shops along with security plans. In addition, there is a dedicated custom clearance house for import and export of diamonds, a National Diamond Research Institute (NDRI), an international convention centre, international education facilities, and five-star hotels. The complex is a pre-certified green building by the Indian Green Building Council (IGBC) because of its eco-friendly and sustainabity measures adopted to function itself, and is dubbed as the world's largest corporate building.

== Reception ==
The bourse has received a lukewarm reception from diamond traders, as it is located on the outskirts of the city of Surat and has poor connectivity, when compared with the existing Bharat Diamond Bourse, located in the better-connected city of Mumbai. The SDB announced incentives for shifting diamond business to Surat. In order to boost connectivity, there needs to be worldwide connectivity with Surat, like the global diamond centres of Antwerp, Chicago and London, in order to establish its dominance out of Mumbai, and let firms enter without hesitation. The Surat Airport has been expanded to an international status, which was also inaugurated on the same day of the SDB's inauguration, and will help to fulfill this target. As of July 2024, out of 4,200 offices, over 200 offices have been opened, out of which over 30 offices are operated by Mumbai-based diamond firms.

== Diamond jewellery mall ==
The complex also has the "diamond jewellery mall", which is a first in the world. It covers an area of 4,600 square metres (50,000 sq ft) within the SDB, and will host top international brands specialised in diamond jewellery retailing. As part of the mall, the SDB will have 27 diamond jewellery showrooms to provide spaces for the brands. The showrooms will be auctioned by the SDB Administrative Committee.

== Customs clearance center ==
The complex houses India's largest customs clearance center, covering an area of 5,600 square metres (60,000 sq ft) The customs office, strategically located in the basement of the SDB, will oversee the export of valuable diamonds to various countries. It will be staffed by 11 officers, including a customs superintendent and inspectors, all sponsored by the SDB diamond bourse committee for the first three years. The customs office hosts many facilities, including a waiting area, two safe deposit vaults, a customs house-clearing (CHA) room, a postal department room, custom officers' cabins, officer cabins, a valuer room, and a conference room. The customs house will inspect and clear diamond parcels for export, which will then be dispatched to the secure vault at Surat Airport for direct export to international destinations. However, due to the lack of direct international air connectivity to key destinations like New York and Antwerp from Surat Airport, the diamond parcels will still be sent to Mumbai for export, once cleared by the SDB customs office. As of December 2023, according to the SDB officials, the final approval from the Delhi customs headquarters is pending. Once granted, the SDB's customs house will be equipped with an Electronic Data Interchange (EDI) system for efficient tracking of diamond imports and exports, thus further streamlining the process for the rising diamond industry of Surat.

== DREAM City ==
The potential of Surat's diamond industry has inspired the conceptualisation of the Diamond Research and Mercantile City (DREAM City). With a core objective of improving the trading facilities of the diamond industry (forward and backward integration), this smart city project, as part of the Smart Cities Mission, covers an area of 683 hectares (1,690 acres), on NH-53, close to the Surat international exhibition and convention centre, and at a distance of 3 km (1.9 mi) from the airport. The SDB is located at the centre of the upcoming city, thus making its location advantageous by staying close to the coast and to global markets, like the Middle Eastern countries of the United Arab Emirates, Iran, Qatar, Oman, etc.

== Environmental protection and sustainability measures ==
With a focus on sustainability, the SDB minimizes its environmental impact by adhering to the principles of Panchtattva, aligning with the five elements of nature. The building consumes 50% less energy by using natural lighting systems, achieving a remarkable 45 kWh/sq.m./yr compared to the industry green benchmarks of 110 kWh/sq.m./yr. as per Energy Conservation Building Code (ECBC), thus earning it the prestigious Indian Green Building Council (IGBC) Platinum rating. It features one of the world’s largest radiant cooling systems. A combination of thermal mass and porosity in relevant areas results in low external heat gains and lower cooling loads. Hybrid climate systems integrate passive strategies for natural ventilation with energy-efficient mechanical cooling. The central spine flares into vertical fins to funnel low-intensity winds using the Venturi effect, while staggered atria allow for the escape of hot air through the stack effect, thereby maintaining a pleasant microclimate, or interior temperature. The radiant cooling systems cool the interiors by an energy-efficient system, that uses chilled water on the floors and ceilings. The rooftop solar project executed for SDB by the Ahmedabad-based startup, URON Energy, is one of the most unique and is one of the highest solar energy-generating rooftop solar projects in the world, with some very rare and ground-breaking features, such as:

- It is the largest floating foundation rooftop solar project in India, utilizing over 545 tons of ready-mix concrete (RMC).
- Around 40 tons of hot-dipped galvanzied (HDG) mounting structures have been set up, setting a new standard and a record for similar capacity solar plants in India.
- It has a unique 3rd generation inverter technology and solar panels have the ability to generate energy from both front and back sides.
- A waterless robotic cleaning solution on the solar panels has been set up to save water and maximize energy generation.

Other features such as sustainable waste disposal systems have been set up, and there is adequate green area in the SDB's premises in order to make the premises eco-friendly and to promote afforestation.

== Connectivity ==
The SDB is connected to DREAM City by a number of transportation options, as the core of the city, including:

- Metro: The SDB is located near the upcoming DREAM City metro station and the Khajod metro depot, which are on the under-construction Surat Metro Line 1. The metro line will connect the SDB to other parts of Surat, as well as to the Surat International Airport.
- BRTS: The SDB is also connected to DREAM City by the BRTS (Bus Rapid Transit System). The BRTS system provides a high-speed bus service that connects the SDB to other parts of Surat.
- Road: The SDB is also connected to DREAM City by road. The main road that connects the SDB to DREAM City is the NH-53, running parallel to just north of the complex.

In addition to these transportation options, there are also plans to build a skywalk that will connect the SDB to the Dream City Convention Centre. The skywalk will provide a pedestrian-friendly connection between the two facilities.

Connectivity between the SDB and DREAM City:

- The metro station is located about 1 km (0.62 mi) from the SDB.
- The BRTS station is located about 500 m (1,600 ft) from the SDB.
- The NH-53 is a six-lane highway that connects the SDB to other parts of Surat.
- The skywalk is expected to be completed in 2024.

== See also ==
- Bharat Diamond Bourse
- Diamond Research and Mercantile City
- Panchtattva
- Solar energy
- Diamond industry
