= Althan =

Althan may refer to:

- Althan, a section of Surat, a city in Gujarat, India
  - Althan National Park
  - Althan Tenament metro station
- House of Althan, a German noble family

== See also ==
- House of Thani or Althani, the ruling dynasty of Qatar
