= Manit =

Manit may refer to:

== People ==
- Manit Joura, Indian actor
- Manit Noywech (born 1980), Thai football player
- Manit Rastogi, co-founder of Morphogenesis (architecture firm)
- Manit Sriwanichpoom (born 1961), Thai artist

== Other ==
- Maulana Azad National Institute of Technology
