= Aqua Line (Nagpur Metro) =

Metro route of mass rapid transit system in Nagpur, India

Overview
- Status: Operational
- Locale: Nagpur
- Termini: Prajapati Nagar; Hingna Mount View
- Stations: 20

Service
- Type: Rapid Transit
- System: Nagpur Metro
- Operator: Maha Metro
- Rolling stock: CRRC Dalian

History
- Opened: 28 January 2020; 6 years ago

Technical
- Line length: 18.557 km
- Character: Elevated and Underground
- Track gauge: 1,435 mm (4 ft 8 1/2 in) (Standard gauge)
- Electrification: 25 kV 50 Hz AC Overhead catenary

The Aqua Line, also known as the East–west corridor, of the Nagpur Metro is a metro route of the mass rapid transit system in Nagpur, India. It was opened on 28 January 2020.

The total length of the corridor is 18.557 km (11.531 mi). with 21 stations from Prajapati Nagar to Hingna Mount View with a total distance of 18.557 km (11.531 mi). All stations are elevated stations and Sitaburdi station is an Interchange Station. Average inter-station distance is 1.00 km (0.621 mi) approximately varying from 0.65 to 1.29 km (0.404 to 0.802 mi) depending upon the site, operational and traffic requirements. The entire corridor is elevated.

The DMRC in its Detailed Project Report (DPR) submitted to Nagpur Improvement Trust has suggested to start the construction work on both the routes simultaneously contradicting the prior suggestion of phase wise development.

== List of stations ==
Following is a list of stations on this route-

Aqua Line
Stn. No.	Station Name		Opened	Chainage (in metre)	Distance from previous station	Connections	Layout
Stn. No.	English	Marathi	Opened	Chainage (in metre)	Distance from previous station	Connections	Layout
1	Prajapati Nagar	प्रजापती नगर	11 December 2022	0.0	0.0	None	Elevated
2	Vaishnodevi Square	वैष्णोदेवी चौक	11 December 2022	1229.3	1229.3	None	Elevated
3	Ambedkar Square	आंबेडकर चौक	11 December 2022	1947.9	718.6	None	Elevated
4	Telephone Exchange	टेलिफोन एक्स्चेंज	11 December 2022	3137.4	1189.5	None	Elevated
5	Chitar Oli Chowk	चितारओळी चौक	11 December 2022	3950.2	812.8	None	Elevated
6	Agrasen Square	अग्रसेन चौक	11 December 2022	4759.8	809.6	None	Elevated
7	Dosar Vaishya Square	दोसर वैश्य चौक	11 December 2022	5590.4	830.6	None	Elevated
8	Nagpur Railway Station	नागपूर रेल्वे स्थानक	11 December 2022	6464.4	874.0	Nagpur Junction	Elevated
9	Cotton Market	कॉटन मार्केट	21 September 2023			None	Elevated
10	Sitabuldi	सिताबर्डी	28 January 2020	7707.7	1243.3	Orange Line	Elevated
11	Jhansi Rani Square	झाशी राणी चौक	28 January 2020	8354.0	646.3	None	Elevated
12	Institution of Engineers	इन्स्टिट्युशन ऑफ इंजिनिअर्स	28 January 2020	9117.2	763.2	None	Elevated
13	Shankar Nagar Square	शंकर नगर चौक	9 December 2020	10074.9	957.7	None	Elevated
14	LAD Square	एलएडी चौक	22 October 2020	10873.1	798.2	None	Elevated
15	Dharampeth College	धरमपेठ महाविद्यालय	6 April 2021	12020.7	1147.6	None	Elevated
16	Subhash Nagar	सुभाष नगर	28 January 2020	12947.1	926.4	None	Elevated
17	Rachana Ring Road Junction	रचना रिंग रोड जंक्शन	9 December 2020	14201.1	1254.0	None	Elevated
18	Vasudev Nagar	माधव नेत्रालय वासुदेव नगर	28 January 2020	15173.9	972.8	None	Elevated
19	Bansi Nagar	बंसी नगर	23 September 2020	16131.6	957.7	None	Elevated
20	Lokmanya Nagar	लोकमान्य नगर	28 January 2020	17792.6	1661.0	None	Elevated

== See also ==
- List of Nagpur Metro stations
- Maharashtra Metro Rail Corporation Limited
- Nagpur Metro
- Orange Line (Nagpur Metro)

== Other Metro systems in India ==
- List of Ahmedabad Metro stations
- List of Chennai Metro stations
- List of Delhi Metro stations
- List of Gurugram Metro stations
- List of Hyderabad Metro stations
- List of Jaipur Metro stations
- List of Kochi Metro stations
- List of Kolkata Metro stations
- List of Lucknow Metro stations
- List of Mumbai Metro stations
- List of Namma Metro stations
- List of Noida Metro stations
