= Vadodara Metro =

Proposed Rapid transit system in Vadodara, Gujarat, India

Overview
- Owner: Gujarat Metro Rail Corporation Limited
- Locale: Vadodara, Gujarat, India
- Transit type: Rapid transit
- Number of lines: 2 (proposed)
- Website: www.gujaratmetrorail.com

Technical
- System length: 40 km (proposed)

The Vadodara Metro is a planned rapid transit system in Vadodara, Gujarat, India. The metro is planned by the Gujarat Metro Rail Corporation Limited (GMRCL). It will have two lines with a total length of about 40 kilometres (25 miles). The estimated cost of the project is ₹11,000 crore.

The metro is planned to connect important parts of the city, including residential areas, business areas, industrial areas and the airport.

== History ==
The Vadodara Metro project was planned to improve public transport in the city.

In April 2025, the Gujarat Metro Rail Corporation sent the Detailed Project Report (DPR) for the Vadodara Metro to the Government of India for approval. The project had already received approval from the Government of Gujarat.

The Gujarat government requested the central government to pay 50% of the project cost. Construction was planned to begin after the required approvals and funding were received.

== Proposed routes ==
The Vadodara Metro is planned to have two lines. The total length of the metro network will be about 40 kilometres (25 miles). The project is being planned by the Gujarat Metro Rail Corporation Limited (GMRCL).

The proposed metro network is expected to connect residential areas, business areas, industrial areas and important transport centres.

Proposed Vadodara Metro routes
Line	Proposed areas served	Length	Stations	Status
Line 1	Industrial areas – Alkapuri – Akota – Vadodara Airport	Not announced	Not announced	Proposed
Line 2	Old City – Vadodara Railway Station – GSFC Industrial Area	Not announced	Not announced	Proposed
Total	2 proposed corridors	About 40 km	Not announced	Proposed

The final routes, station names and number of stations have not yet been officially confirmed. Most of the metro network is planned to be elevated, while some sections may be underground.

== Project cost ==
The estimated cost of the Vadodara Metro is ₹11,000 crore (₹110 billion). The project is planned to be funded by the state and central governments.

== Current status ==
- April 2025: The Detailed Project Report was sent to the central government for approval. The project was still in the planning stage at that time.

== See also ==
- Urban rail transit in India
  - Gujarat Metro Rail Corporation Limited
    - Ahmedabad Metro
    - Surat Metro
    - Rajkot Metro
