= Rajkot Metro =

Proposed rapid transit system in Rajkot, Gujarat, India

Overview
- Owner: Gujarat Metro Rail Corporation Limited
- Locale: Rajkot, Gujarat, India
- Transit type: Rapid transit
- Number of lines: 2 (Proposed)
- Website: https://www.gujaratmetrorail.com/

Technical
- System length: 41 km (Proposed)

Rajkot Metro is a proposed rapid transit system for the city of Rajkot in Gujarat, India. The project is intended to improve urban mobility and provide a public transport alternative to road-based transportation.

The Gujarat Metro Rail Corporation Limited (GMRCL) has been involved in preparing the project's detailed project report (DPR). The proposed network consists of two corridors, with a reported total length of approximately 41 kilometres.

== History ==
Planning for a metro rail system in Rajkot was undertaken as part of the Government of Gujarat's efforts to improve urban public transportation in major cities.

The Gujarat Metro Rail Corporation appointed engineering consultancy SYSTRA to prepare detailed project reports for proposed rail-based mass transit systems in Rajkot, Vadodara, Bhavnagar and Jamnagar.

In June 2024, the proposal for the Rajkot Metro Rail Project was submitted to the Ministry of Housing and Urban Affairs for consideration.

In March 2025, the project was reviewed under the PM Gati Shakti initiative.

In April 2025, it was reported that GMRC had submitted the detailed project reports for the Rajkot and Vadodara metro projects to the Union government.

== Proposed network ==
The Rajkot Metro is planned as a two-line rapid transit network serving Rajkot, Gujarat, India. According to reports published in April 2025, the proposed network would cover approximately 38 kilometres, connecting developing urban areas with the city's railway station and major commercial centres.

The proposed system would consist primarily of elevated sections, with some underground sections. The final alignment, termini, station names and number of stations have not been publicly confirmed.

=== Proposed corridors ===
The project has been described as comprising two metro corridors intended to improve connectivity between residential areas, commercial districts and major transport facilities.

Corridor	Route	Length	Status
Line 1	Alignment not publicly confirmed	Not announced	Proposed
Line 2	Alignment not publicly confirmed	Not announced	Proposed
Total proposed network		Approximately 38–41 km	Planning

In March 2025, the PM Gati Shakti Network Planning Group reviewed a 41.11-kilometre proposal for the Rajkot Metro Rail Project. The proposal included integration with existing transport infrastructure, including regional railway services, city buses and intermediate public transport.

== Project cost and funding ==
The Government of Gujarat conveyed in-principle approval for a proposed metro project in Rajkot, with an estimated cost of ₹10,427 crore.

According to information presented in the Lok Sabha in August 2025, the proposed project had a total length of approximately 41 kilometres.

The project requires the necessary approvals from the central government before implementation.

== See also ==
- Urban rail transit in India
  - Gujarat Metro Rail Corporation Limited
    - Ahmedabad Metro
    - Surat Metro
    - Vadodara Metro
