= List of Nagpur Metro stations =

Stations of the Nagpur Metro

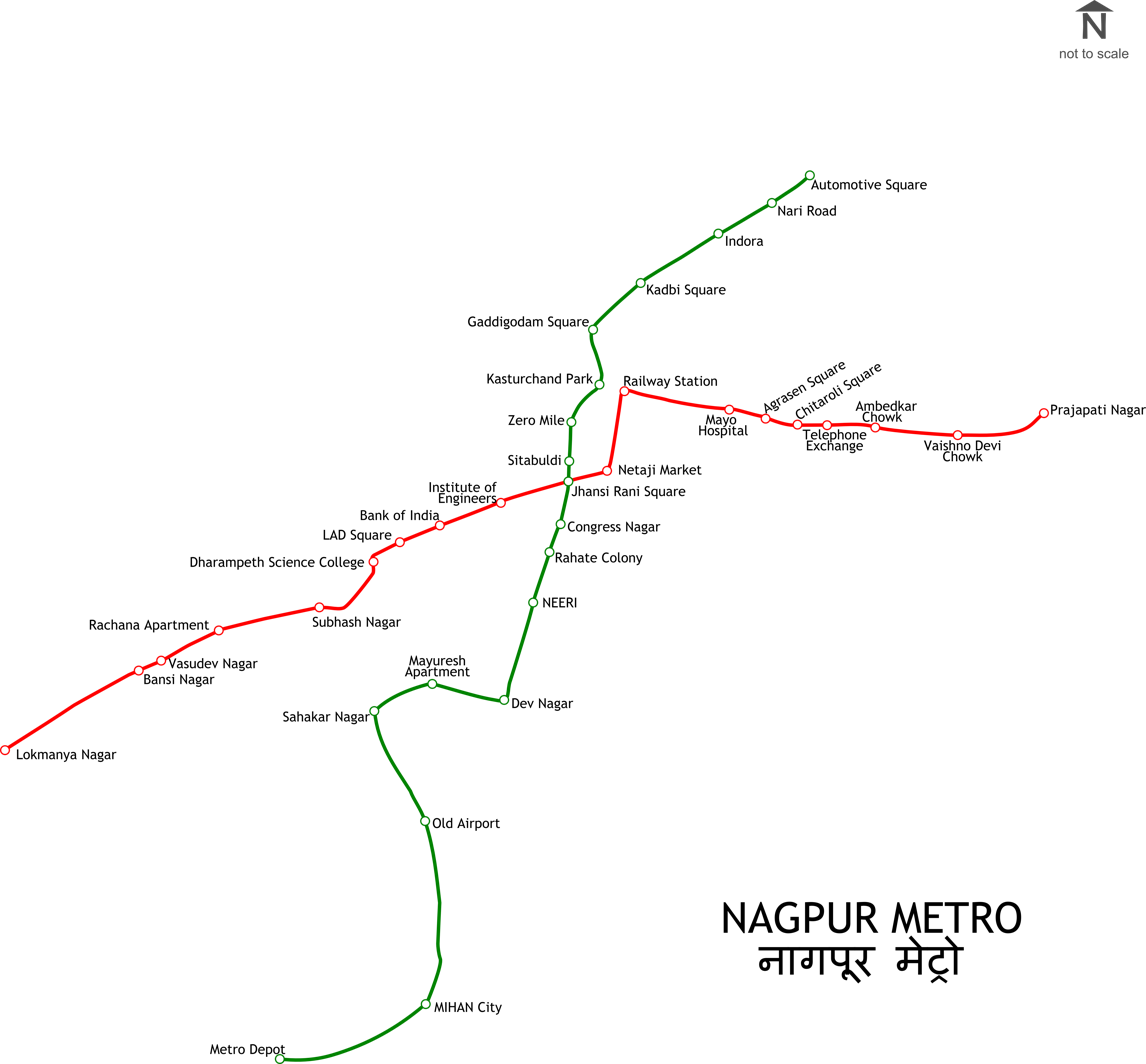
Nagpur Metro rail map

This is a list of all stations of the Nagpur Metro, a rapid transit system serving the city of Nagpur in the Vidarbha region of Maharashtra, India.

Nagpur Metro is the 13th metro system in India. It is built and operated by the Maharashtra Metro Rail Corporation Limited. Its first section was inaugurated on 7 March 2019 and opened for the public on 8 March 2019, with the Orange Line. On 26 January 2020, the Aqua Line was partially inaugurated. Nagpur Metro has 37 metro stations, with a total route length of 38.2 kilometres (23.7 mi). On 11 December 2022, PM Modi inaugurated the entire metro route length of 38.2 kilometres (23.7 mi).

== Metro stations ==
†	Terminal station
*	Transfer station
††	Transfer station to Indian Railways / ISBT
#*	Terminal and transfer station to Indian Railways / ISBT

Metro Station		Line	Opened	Layout	Notes	Ref.
English	Marathi	Line	Opened	Layout	Notes	Ref.
Agrasen Square	अग्रसेन चौक	Aqua Line	11 December 2022	Elevated	–	
Airport	एअरपोर्ट	Orange Line	7 March 2019	Elevated	–	
Airport South	एअरपोर्ट साउथ	Orange Line	7 March 2019	At-grade	Access to Dr. Babasaheb Ambedkar International Airport	
Ajni Square	अजनी चौक	Orange Line	7 March 2019	Elevated	–	
Ambedkar Square	आंबेडकर चौक	Aqua Line	11 December 2022	Elevated	–	
Automotive Square	ऑटोमोटिव्ह चौक	Orange Line	11 December 2022	Elevated	–	
Bansi Nagar	बंसी नगर	Aqua Line	25 September 2020	Elevated	–	
Chhatrapati Square	छत्रपती चौक	Orange Line	6 April 2021	Elevated	–	
Chitar Oli Chowk	चितारओळी चौक	Aqua Line	11 December 2022	Elevated	–	
Congress Nagar††	काँग्रेस नगर	Orange Line	6 April 2021	Elevated	Interchange with Ajni railway station	
Cotton Market	कॉटन मार्केट	Orange Line	21 September 2023	Elevated	–	
Dharampeth College	धरमपेठ महाविद्यालय	Aqua Line	6 April 2021	Elevated	–	
Dosar Vaishya Square	दोसर वैश्य चौक	Aqua Line	11 December 2022	Elevated	–	
Gaddi Godam Square	गड्डीगोदाम चौक	Orange Line	11 December 2022	Elevated	–	
Indora Square	इंदोरा चौक	Orange Line	11 December 2022	Elevated	–	
Institution of Engineers	इन्स्टिट्युशन ऑफ इंजिनिअर्स	Aqua Line	26 January 2020	Elevated	–	
Jaiprakash Nagar	जयप्रकाश नगर	Orange Line	7 March 2019	Elevated	–	
Jhansi Rani Square	झाशी राणी चौक	Aqua Line	26 January 2020	Elevated	–	
Kadvi Chowk	कडबी चौक	Orange Line	11 December 2022	Elevated	–	
Kasturchand Park	कस्तुरचंद पार्क	Orange Line	21 August 2021	Elevated	–	
Khapri#*	खापरी	Orange Line	7 March 2019	At-grade	Interchange with Khapri railway station	
LAD Square	एलएडी चौक	Aqua Line	25 September 2020	Elevated	–	
Lokmanya Nagar†	लोकमान्य नगर	Aqua Line	26 January 2020	Elevated	–	
Nagpur Railway Station††	नागपूर रेल्वे स्थानक	Aqua Line	11 December 2022	Elevated	Interchange with Nagpur Junction railway station	
Nari Road	नारी रोड	Orange Line	11 December 2022	Elevated	–	
New Airport	न्यू एअरपोर्ट	Orange Line	7 March 2019	At-grade	–	
Prajapati Nagar	प्रजापती नगर	Aqua Line	11 December 2022	Elevated	–	
Rachana Ring Road Junction	रचना रिंग रोड जंक्शन	Aqua Line	10 December 2020	Elevated	–	
Rahate Colony	रहाटे कॉलनी	Orange Line	7 March 2019	Elevated	–	
Shankar Nagar Square	शंकर नगर चौक	Aqua Line	10 December 2020	Elevated	–	
Sitabuldi*	सिताबर्डी	Orange Line; Aqua Line	7 March 2019	Elevated	–	
Subhash Nagar	सुभाष नगर	Aqua Line	26 January 2020	Elevated	–	
Telephone Exchange	टेलिफोन एक्स्चेंज	Aqua Line	11 December 2022	Elevated	–	
Ujjwal Nagar	उज्ज्वल नगर	Orange Line	6 April 2021	Elevated	–	
Vaishnodevi Square	वैष्णोदेवी चौक	Aqua Line	11 December 2022	Elevated	–	
Vasudev Nagar	वासुदेव नगर	Aqua Line	26 January 2020	Elevated	–	
Zero Mile Freedom Park	झिरो माइल फ्रीडम पार्क	Orange Line	21 August 2021	Elevated	–	

== Statistics ==
Total number of metro stations	37
Number of interchange stations	1
Number of elevated stations	34
Number of underground stations	0
Number of stations at-grade	3

== See also ==
- List of Ahmedabad Metro stations
- List of Chennai Metro stations
- List of Coimbatore Metro stations
- List of Delhi Metro stations
- List of Hyderabad Metro stations
- List of Jaipur Metro stations
- List of Kochi Metro stations
- List of Kolkata Metro stations
- List of Lucknow Metro stations
- List of Madurai Metro stations
- List of Mumbai Metro stations
- List of Noida Metro stations
- List of Namma Metro stations
- List of Navi Mumbai Metro Stations
- List of Pune Metro stations
- List of Surat Metro stations
