= Long'ao Building =

Building in Jinan, China

Coordinates: 36°39′7.2″N 117°6′49.8″E

The Long'ao Building (龙奥大厦; also spelt as Long Ao Building) is a massively large building in Lixia District, Jinan, Shandong Province, China. The building, completed in 2007, serves as the municipal office building for the city of Jinan.

The 15-storey-tall building has a floor area of 370,000 square metres (4,000,000 sq ft) and is one of the largest office buildings in the world and the second largest government office building, after The Pentagon in America (although it is only about 5,000 square metres (54,000 sq ft) larger than the Palace of the Parliament in Bucharest).

Besides government offices, the Long'ao Building houses public conference rooms, exhibition halls, air defense shelters, archives, medical facilities, and so forth.

The Long'ao Building cost about 4 billion yuan (equivalent to about 640 million American dollars) to construct. The construction required 31,000 tons of steel, 150,000 tons of cement, and 180,000 square metres (1,900,000 sq ft) of stone.

The Long'ao Building was first used as the control and news center for the 11th National Games of China which were held in Jinan in 2009, after which the building was given over to its current use.

== Criticism ==
The Long'ao Building has about 3,600 offices designed to accommodate 6,000 people, an average of almost 60 square metres (650 sq ft) per person (The Pentagon, by comparison, accommodates about 26,000 people in its 620,000 square meters, an average of about 24 square metres (260 sq ft) per person). This relative capaciousness, along with other alleged extravagances, the 4 billion yuan cost, and a perceived lack of transparency in the process of creating the building, has drawn some criticism.

== Transport ==
It is served by Longao Building station on Line 3, Jinan Metro.
