= Digdoh =

- Census town
- Location in Maharashtra, India
- Coordinates: 21.12°N 79.02°E
- Country: India
- State: Maharashtra
- District: Nagpur

Population (2001)
  - Total: 31,498

Languages
  - Official: Marathi
- Time zone: UTC+5:30 (IST)

Digdoh is a census town in Nagpur district in the state of Maharashtra, India.

== Demographics ==
As of 2011 India census, Digdoh had a population of 38,157. Males constitute 56% of the population and females 44%. Digdoh has an average literacy rate of 77%, higher than the national average of 59.5%: male literacy is 82% and, female literacy is 71%. In Digdoh, 15% of the population is under 6 years of age.

| Year | Male | Female | Total Population | Change | Religion (%) | | | | | | | |
| Year | Male | Female | Total Population | Change | Hindu | Muslim | Christian | Sikhs | Buddhist | Jain | Other religions and persuasions | Religion not stated |
|---|---|---|---|---|---|---|---|---|---|---|---|---|
| 2001 | 20637 | 16379 | 37016 | - | 81.570 | 2.007 | 0.619 | 0.419 | 15.077 | 0.173 | 0.122 | 0.014 |
| 2011 | 20590 | 17567 | 38157 | 3.082 | 80.722 | 2.346 | 0.432 | 0.152 | 16.060 | 0.233 | 0.021 | 0.034 |
