= Diamond Research and Mercantile City =

Business district in Surat

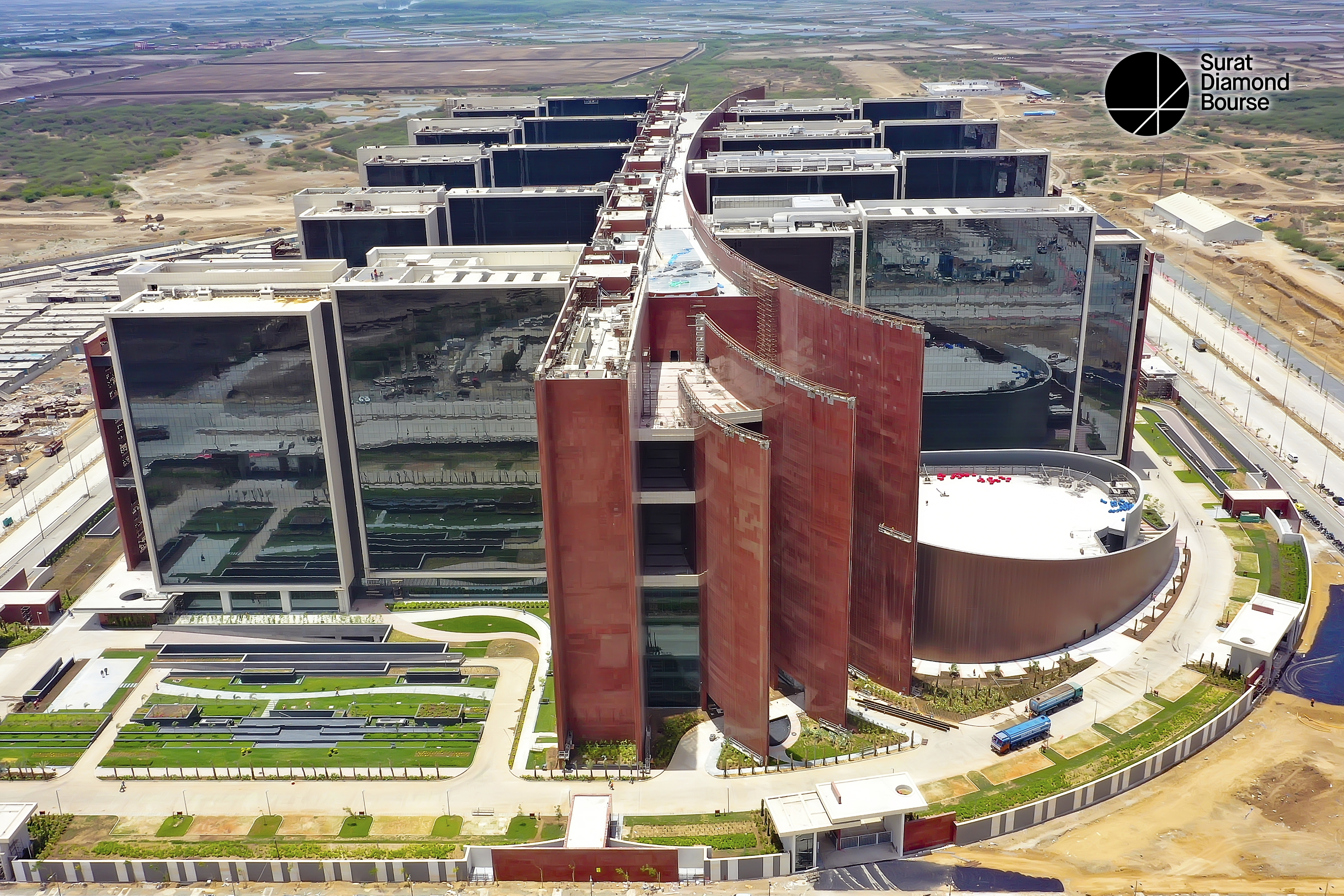
DREAM City phase-1

Diamond Research and Mercantile City, also known as DREAM City, is an upcoming business district in Surat, Gujarat, India. It will be built on 810 hectares (2,000 acres) of land near Khajod, along the lines of the Gujarat International Finance Tec-City and Dholera Smart city near Ahmedabad. Expected to open in 2030, it will be Gujarat's third smart city.

== Description ==
The district is projected to have office space, residential areas, and facilities for these residential areas. It will be established and run by a special purpose entity formed by the Government of Gujarat. The special purpose vehicle, named DREAM City Company Limited, was formed by the passage of a resolution in the assembly of the state government.

=== Surat Diamond Bourse ===
India's second diamond trading centre, the Surat Diamond Bourse, will operate from DREAM City. Its major roles will be trading unpolished diamonds and manufacturing polished diamonds. The Diamond Bourse is expected to have services for import and export of diamonds, as well as banking and insurance services. Presently, diamonds are polished at Surat and traded at India's sole diamond exchange, Bharat Diamond Bourse, in Mumbai.

=== Textile university ===
The Government of Gujarat also announced plans to set up a textile university at DREAM City. This was announced seven months after Union Minister of Finance Arun Jaitley announced the establishment of a textile cluster in Surat.

== Construction schedule ==
The foundation stone was laid by the Chief Minister of Gujarat, Anandiben Patel, on 15 February 2015. The project is to be completed in three phases by the Gujarat Infrastructure Development Board, with the Surat Municipal Corporation assisting with soil testing in places.

== See also ==
- List of tourist attractions in Surat
