= Green Line (Surat Metro) =

Mass transit system in Gujarat, India

Overview
- Status: Under construction
- Locale: Surat, Gujarat, India
- Termini: Bhesan; Saroli
- Stations: 18

Service
- Type: Rapid transit
- System: Surat Metro
- Operator(s): Gujarat Metro Rail Corporation Limited
- Rolling stock: Titagarh Rail Systems

Technical
- Line length: 18.74 km (11.64 mi)
- Character: Elevated
- Track gauge: 1,435 mm (4 ft 8 1/2 in) standard gauge
- Electrification: 750 V DC third rail
- Operating speed: 80 km/h (50 mph) (Top); 32 km/h (20 mph) (average)

Line 2 of Surat Metro also known as The Green Line (Line 2) is an under-construction metro rail line of the Surat Metro, a rapid transit system in Surat, in the state of Gujarat, India.

This line consists of 20 metro stations from Bhesan to Saroli with a total distance of 18.74 km. It is expected to be operational by December 2027.

== List of stations ==
Following is a list of stations on this route:

Green Line
| # | Station Name | | Opening | Connections | Layout |
| # | English | Gujarati | Opening | Connections | Layout |
|---|---|---|---|---|---|
| 1 | Bhesan | ભેસાણ | Under construction | None | Elevated |
| 2 | Botanical Garden | બોટનિકલ ગાર્ડન | Under construction | None | Elevated |
| 3 | Ugat Varigruh | ઉગત વરિગૃહ | Under construction | None | Elevated |
| 4 | Palanpur Road | પાલનપુર રોડ | Under construction | None | Elevated |
| 5 | LP Savani School | એલ.પી.સવાણી સ્કૂલ | Under construction | None | Elevated |
| 6 | Performing Art Centre | પર્ફોર્મિંગ આર્ટ સેન્ટર | Under construction | None | Elevated |
| 7 | Adajan Gam | અડાજણ ગામ | Under construction | None | Elevated |
| 8 | Jagdishchandra Bose Aquarium | જગદીશચંદ્ર બોસ એક્વેરિયમ | Under construction | None | Elevated |
| 9 | Badri Narayan Temple | બદરી નારાયણ મંદિર | Under construction | None | Elevated |
| 10 | Athwa Chopati | અઠવા ચોપાટી | Under construction | None | Elevated |
| 11 | Majura Gate | મજુરા ગેટ | Under construction | Red Line (Under construction) | Elevated |
| 12 | Udhna Darwaja | ઉધના દરવાજા | Under construction | None | Elevated |
| 13 | Kamela Darwaja | કમેલા દરવાજા | Under construction | None | Elevated |
| 14 | Anjana Farm | અંજના ફાર્મ | Under construction | None | Elevated |
| 15 | Model Town | મોડલ ટાઉન | Under construction | None | Elevated |
| 16 | Magob | મગોબ | Under construction | None | Elevated |
| 17 | Bharat Cancer Hospital | ભારત કેન્સર હોસ્પિટલ | Under construction | None | Elevated |
| 18 | Saroli | સારોલી | Under construction | None | Elevated |

== See also ==
- Surat
- Surat Metro
- Red Line (Surat Metro)
- List of rapid transit systems in India
- List of metro systems
