= Nildoh =

- Census town
- Location in Maharashtra, India
- Coordinates: 21.1046°N 78.9862°E
- Country: India
- State: Maharashtra
- District: Nagpur

Population (2001)
  - Total: 15,375

Languages
  - Official: Marathi
- Time zone: UTC+5:30 (IST)

Nildoh is a census town in Nagpur district in the Indian state of Maharashtra.

== Demographics ==
As of 2001 India census, Nildoh had a population of 15,381. Males constitute 56% of the population and females 44%. Nildoh has an average literacy rate of 72%, higher than the national average of 59.5%: male literacy is 78%, and female literacy is 64%. In Nildoh, 18% of the population is under 6 years of age.

Year	Male	Female	Total Population	Change	Religion (%)							
Year	Male	Female	Total Population	Change	Hindu	Muslim	Christian	Sikhs	Buddhist	Jain	Other religions and persuasions	Religion not stated
2001	8605	6776	15381	-	77.368	1.755	0.670	0.280	19.752	0.059	0.039	0.078
2011	11566	9322	20888	35.804	78.074	2.308	0.268	0.115	19.011	0.077	0.029	0.120
