= Morphogenesis (architecture firm) =

Architectural firm in India

- Company type: Private
- Founded: 1996
- Headquarters: New Delhi, India
- Area served: India
- Founders: Manit Rastogi; Sonali Rastogi
- Industry: Architecture
- Website: www.morphogenesis.org

Morphogenesis is an Indian architectural firm founded by Manit Rastogi and Sonali Rastogi in 1996.

== History ==
The firm was established by Manit and Sonali Rastogi in 1996. The first project of the company was with Apollo Tyres. Manit is a Fellow of the Indian Institute of Architects and Royal Society of Arts. Manit has also been a director of Sushant School of Art and Architecture, Gurgaon (2009–2011). Manit is active in efforts towards reclaiming the Nullahs of Delhi and transforming them into a green and sustainable network. He has also presented a proposal for rock-cut architecture for Amarnath caves.

Sonali Rastogi is a fellow at Indian Institute of Architects (IIA), the Royal Society of the Arts (RSA), UK, and was a member of the Delhi Urban Arts Commission.

== Projects and work portfolio ==
Morphogenesis has worked with clients from various industries. Their major clients include:

- Apollo Tyres
- Pearl Academy, Jaipur
- Infosys
- Delhi Art Gallery, New Delhi
- Trump Tower
- Surat Diamond Bourse

== Awards and accolades ==
- AIT Awards 2012: public building (interiors)
- AIT Awards 2012: Office (Interior)
- AD100 Award
- Scroll of Honour' Realty Plus Awards 2016
- SIA-GETZ Architecture Prize 2014.
- World Architecture Festival Award (2009)
- CWAB Awards, India’ Top Architects (2017)
- NDTV Architecture and Design Awards (2014)
