= Red Line (Surat Metro) =

Mass transit system in Gujarat, India

Overview
- Status: Under construction
- Locale: Surat, Gujarat, India
- Termini: Sarthana; DREAM City
- Stations: 20

Service
- Type: Rapid transit
- System: Surat Metro
- Operator: Gujarat Metro Rail Corporation Limited
- Rolling stock: Titagarh Rail Systems

Technical
- Line length: 21.61 km (13.43 mi)
- Character: Elevated & Underground
- Track gauge: 1,435 mm (4 ft 8 1/2 in) standard gauge
- Electrification: 750 V DC third rail
- Operating speed: 80 km/h (50 mph) (Top); 32 km/h (20 mph) (average)

Line 1 of Surat Metro also known as The Red Line (Line 1) is an under-construction metro rail line of the Surat Metro, a rapid transit system in Surat, Gujarat, India. This line consists of 20 metro stations from Sarthana to DREAM City with a total distance of 21.61 km. 15.14 km of this distance will be elevated and 6.47 km underground. It is expected to be operational by December 2027.

== List of stations ==
Following is a list of stations on this route:

Red Line
#	Station Name		Opening	Connections	Layout
#	English	Gujarati	Opening	Connections	Layout
1	Sarthana	સરથાણા	Under construction	None	Elevated
2	Nature Park	નેચર પાર્ક	Under construction	None	Elevated
3	Varachha Chopati Garden	વરાછા ચોપાટી ગાર્ડન	Under construction	None	Elevated
4	Shri Swaminarayan Mandir	શ્રી સ્વામિનારાયણ મંદિર	Under construction	None	Elevated
5	Kapodra	કાપોદ્રા	Under construction	None	Underground
6	Labheshwar Chowk	લાભેશ્વર ચોક	Under construction	None	Underground
7	Central Warehouse	સેન્ટ્રલ વેરહાઉસ	Under construction	None	Underground
8	Surat Railway Station	સુરત રેલ્વે સ્ટેશન	Under construction	Surat	Underground
9	Maskati Hospital	મસ્કતી હોસ્પિટલ	Under construction	None	Underground
10	Chowk Bazar	ચોક બજાર	Under construction	None	Underground
11	Kadarsha Ni Naal	કાદરશા ની નાળ	Under construction	None	Elevated
12	Majura Gate	મજુરા ગેટ	Under construction	Green Line (Under construction)	Elevated
13	Rupali Canal	રૂપાલી કેનાલ	Under construction	None	Elevated
14	Althan Tenament	અલથાણ ટેનામેન્ટ	Under construction	None	Elevated
15	Althan Gam	અલથાણ ગામ	Under construction	None	Elevated
16	VIP Road	વી.આઈ.પી રોડ	Under construction	None	Elevated
17	Surat Woman ITI	સુરત વુમન આઈ.ટી.આઈ	Under construction	None	Elevated
18	Bhimrad	ભીમરાડ	Under construction	None	Elevated
19	Convention Center	કન્વેન્શન સેન્ટર	Under construction	None	Elevated
20	DREAM City	ડ્રીમ સિટી	Under construction	None	Elevated

== See also ==
- Surat
- Surat Metro
- Green Line (Surat Metro)
- List of rapid transit systems in India
- List of metro systems
