= Surat Metro =

Rapid transit system in Surat, Gujarat, India

Overview
- Owner: Gujarat Metro Rail Corporation Limited
- Locale: Surat, Gujarat
- Transit type: Rapid Transit
- Number of lines: 2 (Phase - I)
- Line number: Under Construction: Red Line Green Line
- Number of stations: 38
- Website: Gujarat Metro

Operation
- Operation will start: December 2027; 1 year's time
- Character: Elevated & Underground
- Rolling stock: Titagarh Rail Systems

Technical
- System length: 40.35 kilometres (25.07 mi)
- Track gauge: 1,435 mm (4 ft 8 1/2 in) standard gauge
- Electrification: 750 V DC third rail
- Average speed: 80 km/h

Surat Metro is an under-construction rapid transit system for the city of Surat in Gujarat state of India. Two corridors with a combined length of 40.35 kilometers are under construction since 18 January 2021. The project is expected to be completed by December 2026 at an estimated cost of ₹12,020.32 crore (US$1.3 billion).

== History ==
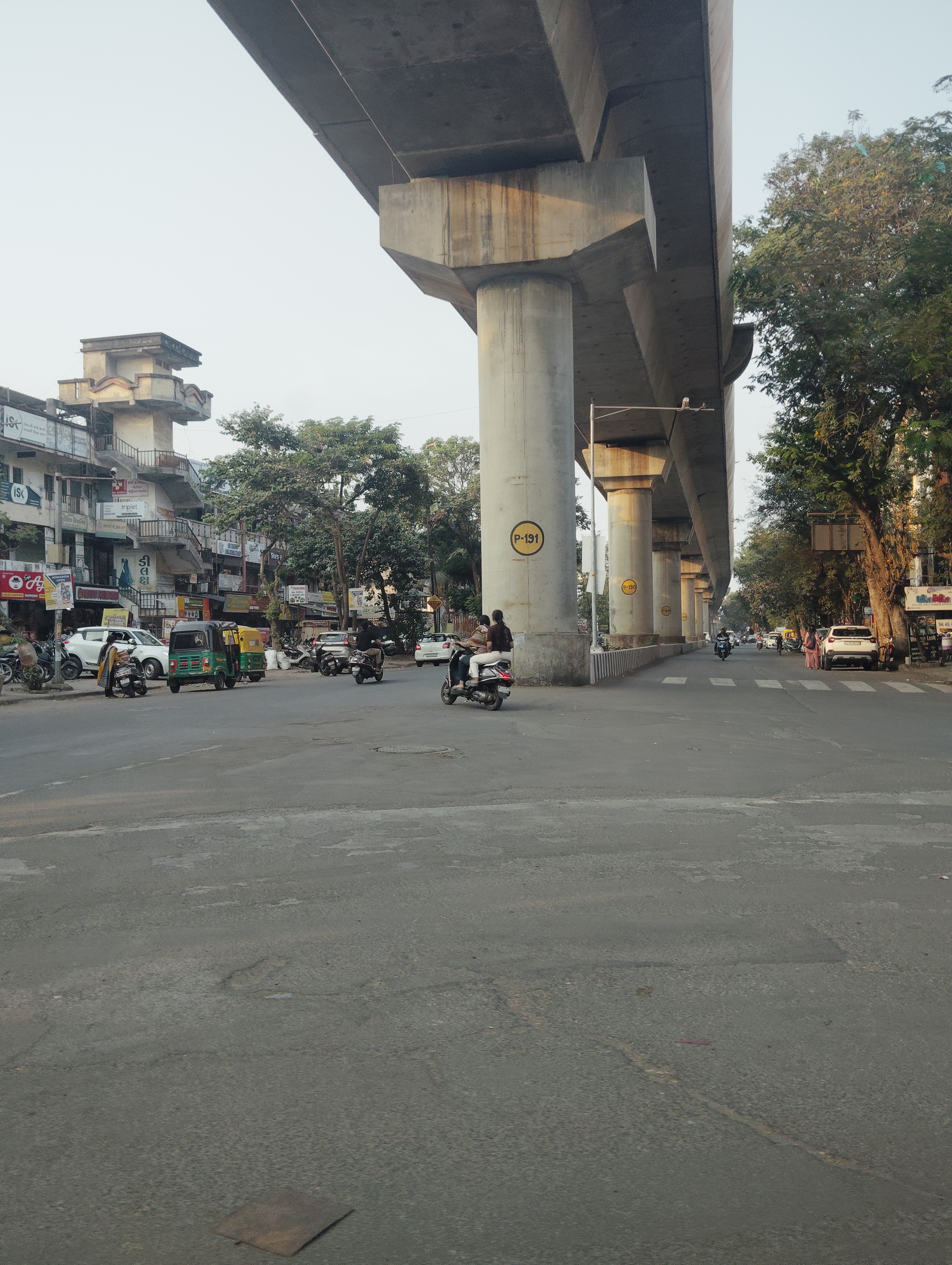
Under construction pillars of Green Line near L P Savani School Station

In August 2012, the Surat Municipal Corporation (SMC) proposed four rail routes for the metro project. The Government of Gujarat approved two corridors in January 2017.

The union government approved the project on 11 March 2019. It will be implemented by Gujarat Metro Rail Corporation Limited and financed mainly through equity from Government of India and Government of Gujarat on 50:50 basis and loan from bilateral/ multilateral agencies. French development agency AFD has committed to lend 250 million euros for the project, which was signed on January 28, 2021. On 9 March 2019, the Public Investment Board (PIB) approved ₹12,000 crore (US$1.3 billion) for the project. On 17 December 2021, Germany Development Bank KfW and Government of India signed a €442.26 million loan pact towards the project.

In June 2020, the construction bids were invited for Phase-1.

The foundation of the project was laid on 18 January 2021 by Prime Minister Narendra Modi. Construction was expected to be completed by the end of 2024. However, as of July 2023, the deadline for the completion of the first phase has been rescheduled to December 2027, due to some slowdowns and delays in work.

The first trial run was conducted in March 2026.

== Construction Phases ==
=== Phase 1 ===
The detailed project report for Phase 1 of the Surat Metro was prepared by the Delhi Metro Rail Corporation on behalf of the Surat Municipal Corporation. The Government of Gujarat approved the two proposed corridors in January 2017, followed by approval from the Government of India in March 2019. The estimated project cost was ₹12,020.32 crore, with implementation assigned to the Gujarat Metro Rail Corporation (GMRC). Financing was planned through equal equity contributions from the central and Gujarat governments, supplemented by loans from bilateral and multilateral agencies.

The approved network comprised two corridors with a combined length of 40.35 kilometres and 38 stations. Corridor 1, connecting Sarthana and DREAM City, was planned to extend for 21.61 kilometres, comprising 15.14 kilometres of elevated alignment and a 6.47-kilometre underground section, with 20 stations. Corridor 2, between Bhesan and Saroli, was planned as an entirely elevated, 18.74-kilometre route with 18 stations. Maintenance depots were proposed at DREAM City and Bhesan.

Prime Minister Narendra Modi laid the foundation stone through video conferencing on 18 January 2021. By September 2021, GMRC had awarded civil construction contracts worth more than ₹3,002 crore. Work had begun on the elevated section between DREAM City and Majura Gate and the underground section between Kapodara and Chowk Bazaar.

The underground works were divided into separate construction packages. A joint venture between Gülermak and Sam India Builtwell undertook the section from Kapodara towards Surat railway station, while J. Kumar Infraprojects received the contract for the section between Surat railway station and Chowk Bazaar. ITD Cementation India received a separate contract for the DREAM City depot, including the operations control centre and administrative headquarters.

A €250 million loan agreement with the French development agency, Agence française de développement (AFD), was signed on 28 January 2021. On 17 December 2021, the Government of India signed a further loan agreement worth €442.26 million with the German development bank KfW.

The project was originally planned for completion within five years of approval, with March 2024 identified as the initial completion target. Construction continued beyond that target. On 30 August 2024, a tunnel breakthrough was achieved between Central Warehouse and Surat railway station. In September 2024, tunnel boring machine S94, named Tapi, completed its third and final drive at Surat railway station after excavating a 389-metre tunnel from Central Warehouse station.

Trial runs began on 29 March 2026 on an 8.5-kilometre section of the north–south corridor between DREAM City and Althan Tenement, covering seven stations. Approximately 500 hours of testing and inspections were planned before passenger services could begin, subject to statutory approvals.

On 14 May 2026, a trial run was conducted on a 6.5-kilometre section of the east–west corridor from Bhesan towards Adajan, passing through Ugat Varigruh, Palanpur Road, LP Savani School and Performing Arts Centre stations.

Phase 1 network
No.	Line Name	Terminals		Length	Stations	Status	Opening Date
1	Red Line	Sarthana	Althan Tenament	13.11 km	13	Under Construction	December 2027
1	Red Line	Althan Tenament	DREAM City	8.5 km	7	Under Construction	November 2026
2	Green Line	Bhesan	Saroli	18.74 km	18	Under Construction	December 2027
Total				40.35 km	38		

== Status updates ==
- 9 March 2019: Public Investment Board (PIB) approves 12,000 Crores INR Surat Metro rail project.
- 11 March 2019: Surat metro rail project approved by central govt with combined length of 40.35 km.
- 28 April 2020: GMRC invited tenders for Detailed Design Consultancy Services for Corridor 1 and 2.
- 30 April 2020: GMRC invited Expression of Interest for Phase 1's General Engineering Consultant
- Jun 2020: Construction bids invited for Phase-1. Construction work to begin soon.
- 18 Jan 2021: Prime Minister Narendra Modi laid down foundation stone of Surat Metro. Construction is expected to complete by late 2027.
- 17 April 2026: Trial runs on a key stretch of the Surat Metro have begun, bringing the city closer to the launch of a mass rapid transit system expected to ease congestion and improve access to major commercial centres, including the Surat Diamond Bourse. The Gujarat Metro Rail Corporation Limited has initiated testing on an 8.5-kilometre corridor between Dream City and Althan Tenement. The trial phase, scheduled over 500 hours, is examining the train's speed, braking systems and other technical parameters ahead of operational clearance.

== See also ==
- Urban rail transit in India
  - Gujarat Metro Rail Corporation Limited
    - Ahmedabad Metro
    - Rajkot Metro
    - Vadodara Metro
