= Lokmanya Nagar metro station =

Nagpur Metro's Aqua Line terminal metro station

Lokmanya Nagar
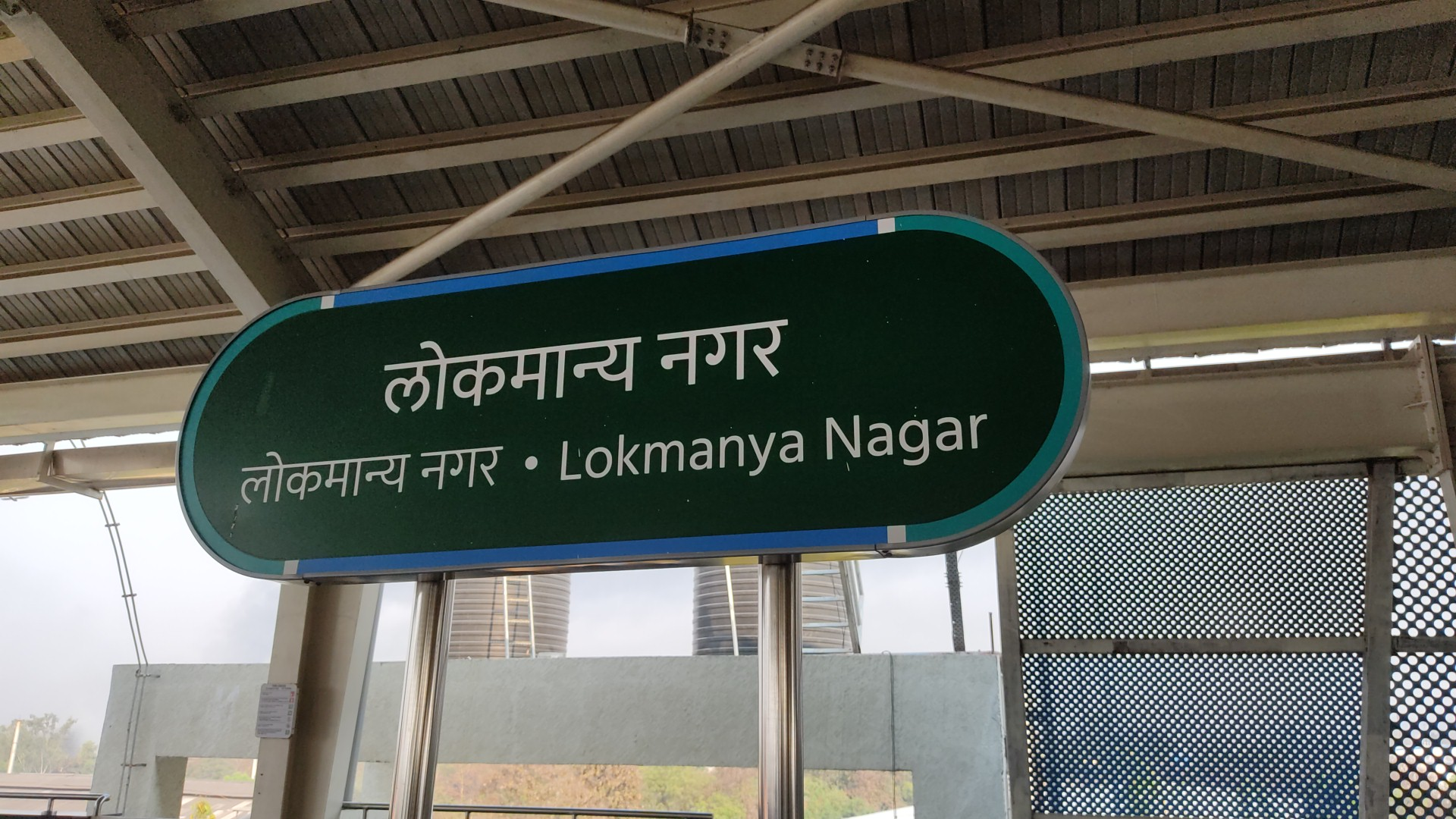

General information
- Location: Kalmegh Nagar, S R P Camp, Nildoh ct, Maharashtra 440016
- Coordinates: 21.11068°N 79.00161°E
- System: Nagpur Metro station
- Owner: Maharashtra Metro Rail Corporation Limited (MAHA-METRO)
- Operator: Nagpur Metro
- Line: Aqua Line
- Platforms: Side platform Platform-1 → Prajapati Nagar; Platform-2 → Train Terminates Here (further extended to Hingna Mount View in the near future)
- Tracks: 2

Construction
- Structure type: Elevated, Double track
- Platform levels: 2
- Accessible: Yes

History
- Opened: 28 January 2020; 6 years ago
- Electrified: 25 kV 50 Hz AC overhead catenary

Services
Preceding station	Nagpur Metro	Following station
Bansi Nagar towards Prajapati Nagar	Aqua Line	Terminus
Future service
Bansi Nagar towards Prajapati Nagar	Aqua Line	Hingna Mount View Terminus
Route map
Location

Lokmanya Nagar is the elevated western terminal metro station on the east–west corridor of the Aqua Line of Nagpur Metro in Nagpur, India. The metro station became operational on 28 January 2020.

== Station layout ==
G	Street level	Exit/Entrance
L1	Mezzanine	Fare control, station agent, Metro Card vending machines, crossover
L2	Side platform | Doors will open on the left
L2	Platform 1 Eastbound	Towards → Prajapati Nagar; Next Station: Bansi Nagar
L2	Platform 2 Westbound	Towards ← Train Terminates Here
L2	Side platform | Doors will open on the left
L2

== See also ==
- Nagpur
- Maharashtra
- List of Nagpur Metro stations
- Rapid transit in India
