= Prajapati Nagar metro station =

Nagpur Metro's Aqua Line terminal metro station

Prajapati Nagar

General information
- Location: Old Pardi Naka, Surya Nagar, Nagpur, Maharashtra 440035
- Coordinates: 21.14996°N 79.14870°E
- System: Nagpur Metro station
- Owner: Maharashtra Metro Rail Corporation Limited (MAHA-METRO)
- Operator: Nagpur Metro
- Line: Aqua Line
- Platforms: Side platform Platform-1 → Train Terminates Here; Platform-2 → Lokmanya Nagar
- Tracks: 2

Construction
- Structure type: Elevated, Double track
- Platform levels: 2
- Accessible: Yes

Other information
- Status: Operational
- Station code: PJN

History
- Opening: 12 December 2022; 3 years ago
- Electrified: 750 V DC third rail

Services
| Preceding station | Nagpur Metro | Following station |
|---|---|---|
| Terminus | Aqua Line | Vaishnodevi Square towards Lokmanya Nagar |
Route map
Location

Prajapati Nagar is the elevated eastern terminal metro station on the East-West Corridor of the Aqua Line of Nagpur Metro in Nagpur, India. This metro station was inaugurated on 11 December 2022 by Prime Minister Narendra Modi and was opened to the public on 12 December 2022.

== Station layout ==
| G | Street level | Exit/Entrance |
| L1 | Mezzanine | Fare control, station agent, Metro Card vending machines, crossover |
| L2 | Side platform | Doors will open on the left |
| L2 | Platform 1 Eastbound | Towards → Train Terminates Here |
| L2 | Platform 2 Westbound | Towards ← Lokmanya Nagar; Next Station: Vaishno Devi Square |
| L2 | Side platform | Doors will open on the left |
| L2 |

== See also ==
- Nagpur
- Maharashtra
- List of Nagpur Metro stations
- Rapid transit in India
